= List of mosques in Laos =

This is a list of mosques in Laos.

Name	Images	Location	Century	Remarks
Azahar Mosque		Chanthabuly, Vientiane	1986 (Note: It was established on 1976, Completed on 1986. For more ( History of Azahar Mosque ))	
Vientiane Jamia Mosque		Near Nam Phu Fountain, Vientiane	1970	
Ikhlas Mosque		Khamsavath, Vientiane		

== See also ==
- Islam in Laos
- Lists of mosques
