= List of mosques in Turkmenistan =

This is a list of mosques in Turkmenistan.

Name	Images	Location	Year/century	Remarks
Ertuğrul Gazi Mosque		Ashgabat	1998	
Gurbanguly Hajji Mosque		Mary	2009	
Saparmurat Hajji Mosque		Gökdepe	1995	
Türkmenbaşy Ruhy Mosque		Ashgabat	2004	
Daşoguz Mosque		Daşoguz	2015	
Hezreti Omar Mosque		Ashgabat	2018	
Lebap Region Mosque		Türkmenabat	2020	
Mosque of Yusuf Hamadani		Merv	12th century	Renovated in 1990

== See also ==
- Islam in Turkmenistan
- Lists of mosques
