= List of mosques in the Maldives =

This is a list of mosques in the Maldives. The first mosques built in the Maldives were initially made of materials that easy degraded over time such as wood, coconut, and palm leaves. Later on, by the middle of the 17th to early 19th centuries, Maldivian coral stone mosque architecture developed and flourished. Due to the country's proximity with the Arabian peninsula, Arabian onion-dome mosque architecture soon replaced the majority of indigenous Maldivian coral stone mosques by the middle of the 19th century. Today, only six Maldivian coral stone mosques are in good condition, all of which are listed as UNESCO Tentative Sites under the nomination name of Coral Stone Mosques of Maldives.

== Coral stone mosques ==
Coral stone mosques are ancient mosques of Maldives built with interlocking mechanisms that mainly consist of coral stones. They are unique architectural structures not seen in any other part of the world.

Image	English Name	Dhivehi Name	Island	Historic / Etymological Location	Atoll / Administrative Division	Built / Circa	Coral Type	Remarks
Gen Mosque in Fuvah Mulah	Fuvah Mulah Gen Mosque	Gen Miskiy	Fuvah Mulah	Addumulah	Gnaviyani Atoll	1300	Coral Sandstone (Veligaa)	Oldest coral stone mosque in Maldives built straight after conversion to Islam.
	Fuvah Mulah Kedeyre Mosque	Kedeyre Miskiy	Fuvah Mulah	Addumulah	Gnaviyani Atoll	1397	Coral Sandstone (Veligaa)	
	Hulhumeedhoo Koagannu Mosque	Koagannu Miskiy	Hulhumeedhoo of Addu	Addumulah	Addu Atoll	1397	Coral Sandstone (Veligaa)	Oldest mosque in Koagannu. It also has the largest and the oldest cemetery in the Maldives.
	Guraidhoo Ziyaarai Mosque	Guraidhoo Ziyaarai Miskiy	Guraidhoo		Thaa Atoll	1400	Coral Porite (Hirigaa)	Has the mausoleum of Sultan Usman of Fehendhoo
	Hulhumeedhoo Boadha Mosque	Hulhumeedhoo Boadha Miskiy	Hulhumeedhoo of Addu	Addumulah	Addu Atoll	1403	Coral Porite (Hirigaa)	
	Hulhumeedhoo Athara Mosque	Athara Miskiy	Hulhumeedhoo of Addu	Addumulah	Addu Atoll	1417	Coral Sandstone (Veligaa)	
	Vaadhoo Old Friday Mosque	Vaadhoo Asaaree Miskiy	Vaadhoo	Suvadinmathi	Huvadu Atoll / Gaaf Dhaal	1500	Coral Sandstone and Porite Coral (Veligaa/Hirgaa)	Known to have been used by the religious scholar Vaadhoo Dhaanaa Kaleyfaanu.
	Utheemu Kandhuvalu Mosque	Utheemu Kandhuvalu Miskiy	Utheemu		Haa Alif Atoll	1500	Coral Sandstone and Porite Coral (Veligaa/Hirgaa)	It has the mausoleum of father and grandfather of Sultan Ghazi Mohamed Thakurufaan.
	Baarah Old Friday Mosque	Baarah Hukuru Miskiy	Baarah		Haa Alif Atoll	1500	Coral Sandstone and Porite Coral (Veligaa/Hirgaa)	Used by Sultan Ghazi Mohamed Thakurufaan. Restored by Sultan Mohamed of Devvadhoo after damage.
	Kolhufushi Gazee Mosque	Gazee Miskiy	Kolhufushi		Meemu Atoll	1573	Coral Sandstone (Veligaa)	Timber used in the mosque is said to be from Kalhuohfummi, famous boat used by the Utheemu brothers.
	Hulhumeedhoo Fandiyaaru Mosque	Hulhumeedhoo Fandiyaaru Miskiy	Hulhumeedhoo of Addu	Addumulah	Addu Atoll	1586	Coral Porite (Hirigaa)	
	Hangnaameedhoo Old Mosque	Hangnaameedhoo Asaaree Miskiy	Hangnaameedhoo		Alif Dhaal Atoll	1600	Coral Sandstone (Veligaa)	The mosque is near the mausoleum of Sultan Ibrahim III
	Veyvah Old Mosque	Veyvah Asaaree Miskiy	Veyvah		Meemu Atoll	1600	Coral Porite (Hirigaa)	
	Bileddhoo Old Mosque	Bileddhoo Masjid Zikra	Bileddhoo		Faafu Atoll	1600	Coral Porite (Hirigaa)	
	Malé Friday Mosque	Malé Hukuru Miskiy	Malé	Mahal Atholhu	Kaafu Atoll	1658	Coral Porite (Hirigaa)	UNESCO Tentative Site. Largest coral stone mosque in Maldives built during reign of Sultan Ibrahim Iskandhar I. Master carpenters were Ali Maavadi Kaleyfaanu and Mahmud Maavadi Kaleyfaanu from Kondey, Huvadu. Calligrapher was Chief Justice Al Faqh Al Qazi Jamaaludheen. It took 2 years to construct the mosque. In terms of artistic excellence and construction technique using only interlocking assembly, it is one of the finest coral stone buildings of the world.
	Kondey Old Mosque	Kondey Asaaree Miskiy	Kondey	Suvadinmathi	Huvadu Atoll / Gaaf Alif	1687	Coral Porite (Hirigaa)	Originally built by the two master carpenters of Malé Hukuru Miskiy. Ali Maavadi Kaleyfaanu and Mahmud Maavadi Kaleyfaanu from Kondey, Huvadu. Extensively remodeled after damage which now basically is a modern structure.
	Mathiveri Old Mosque	Mathiveri Asaaree Miskiy	Mathiveri		Alif Alif Atoll	1687	Coral Sandstone (Veligaa)	Built by Sultan Ibrahim Iskandhar I
	Fenfushi Friday Mosque	Fenfushi Hukuru Miskiy	Fenfushi	Ari-adhe Atholhu	Alif Dhaal Atoll	1692		UNESCO Tentative Site.
	Malé Dharumavantha Rasgefaanu Mosque	Dharumavantha Rasgefaan Miskiy	Malé	Mahal Atholhu	Kaafu Atoll	1694	Coral Sandstone and Porite Coral (Veligaa/Hirgaa)	Believed to be originally built by the first Muslim Sultan, Dharumavantha Rasgefaan
	Malé Seedhee Mosque	Seedhee Miskiy	Malé	Mahal Atholhu	Kaafu Atoll	1697	Coral Sandstone and Porite Coral (Veligaa/Hirgaa)	Believed to have been originally built by Sultan Jamsudheen Umar Veeru
	Maaenboodhoo Small Mosque	Maaenboodhoo Kuda Miskiy	Maaenboodhoo		Dhaal Atoll	1700	Coral Sandstone and Porite Coral (Veligaa/Hirgaa)	
	Maaenboodhoo Old Friday Mosque	Maaenboodhoo Asaaree Miskiy	Maaenboodhoo		Dhaal Atoll	1700	Coral Sandstone (Veligaa)	Built on the site of a Buddhist monastery.
	Naalaafushi Old Mosque	Naalaafushi Asaaree Miskiy	Naalaafushi		Meemu Atoll	1700	Coral Sandstone and Porite Coral (Veligaa/Hirgaa)	Damaged during 2004 tsunami but since been renovated.
	Dhevvadhoo Old Friday Mosque	Dhevvadhoo Hukuru Miskiy	Dhevvadhoo	Suvadinmathi	Huvadu Atoll / Gaaf Alif	1701	Coral Sandstone and Porite Coral (Veligaa/Hirgaa)	Built by Sultan Ibrahim III and rebuilt by Sultan Mohamed of Devvadhoo
	Isdhoo Old Mosque	Isdhoo Assaaree Miskiy	Isdhoo	Haddhunmathi	Laamu Atoll	1701		UNESCO Tentative Site.
	Ihavandhoo Friday Mosque	Ihavandhoo Hukuru Miskiy	Ihavandhoo	Thiladunmathi	Haa Alif Atoll	1701		UNESCO Tentative Site.
	Meedhoo Friday Mosque	Meedhoo Hukuru Miskiy	Meedhoo	Maalhosmaduva	Raa Atoll	1705		UNESCO Tentative Site.
	Malé Eid Mosque	Malé Eid Miskiy	Malé	Mahal Atholhu	Kaafu Atoll	1815		UNESCO Tentative Site.

== Modern mosques ==
Name	Images	Location	Year/century	Remarks
Hulhumalé Grand Mosque		Hulhumalé	2000s	Officially, Masjid al Sheikh Qasim bin Al-Thani
Islamic Centre		Malé	1984	
Al Yoosuf Mosque		Eydhafushi	1970s	
King Salman Mosque		Malé	2022	

== See also ==
- Islam in the Maldives
- Lists of mosques
