= List of mosques in Turkey =

This is a list of mosques in Turkey. As of March 2013, there were 82,693 mosques in Turkey. The province with the highest number of mosques (3,113) was Istanbul and the lowest number (117) was Tunceli Province. This reflected an increase of mosques by 7,324 in the 10-year period since 2003.

Name	Images	City	Year	Remarks
Ahmet Hamdi Akseki Mosque		Ankara	2013	
Altunizade Mosque		Istanbul	1865	Ottoman mosque
Arap Mosque		Istanbul	1323	The mosque's legendary foundation by Maslama ibn Abd al-Malik, traditionally dated to 715 AD, is presented as its actual foundation date on the mosque's commemorative plaque - The building was converted into a mosque between 1475 and 1478
Aslanhane Mosque		Ankara	1290	
Atik Mustafa Pasha Mosque		Istanbul	1059	
Atik Valide Mosque		Istanbul	1583	Ottoman mosque
Başdurak Mosque		İzmir	1652	built by Hacı Hüseyin.
Bayezid II Mosque		Istanbul	1506	Commissioned by Beyazıt II
Bebek Mosque		Istanbul	1913	commissioned by Grand Vizier Nevşehirli Damat Ibrahim Pasha (1666–1730).
Bodrum Mosque		Istanbul	10th century	
Burmalı Mosque		Istanbul	1550	Ottoman mosque
Bursa Grand Mosque		Bursa	1420	Largest mosque in Bursa
Çamlıca Mosque		Istanbul	2019	Post-Ottoman mosque
Defterdar Mosque		Istanbul	1542	Ottoman mosque, commissioned by Defterdar Nazlı Mahmut Efendi.
Dolmabahçe Mosque		Istanbul	1855	Ottoman mosque, commissioned by queen mother Bezmi Alem Valide Sultan
Emir Sultan Mosque		Bursa	1868	
Eski Imaret Mosque		Istanbul	Short before 1087	
Eyüp Sultan Mosque		Istanbul	1458	The tomb and mosque of Abu Ayyub al-Ansari
Firuz Agha Mosque		Istanbul	1491	15th-century Ottoman mosque.
Great Central Mosque of Avcılar		Avcılar	2019	
Great Mosque of Diyarbakır		Diyarbakır	1091	
Green Mosque		Bursa	1421	"Green Mosque" commissioned by Mehmet I
Hacı Bayram Mosque		Ankara	1428	Ottoman mosque, built by Mehmet Bey.
Hagia Sophia		Istanbul	537	Converted after the Conquest of Constantinople by Sultan Mehmed II, became a public museum in 1935. In 2020, it was made again a mosque.
İsa Bey Mosque		İzmir	1374	One of the oldest and most impressive works of architectural art remaining from the Anatolian beyliks.
Kocatepe Mosque		Ankara	1987	
Laleli Mosque		Istanbul	1783	by Sultan Mustafa III.
Little Hagia Sophia		Istanbul	536	
Menüçehr Mosque		Kars	1086	First mosque in the current borders of Turkey. Built by the Shaddadids.
Mersin Grand Mosque		Mersin	1898	
Mihrimah Mosque		Istanbul	1565	Commissioned by the daughter of Suleyman I
Mimar Sinan Mosque		Istanbul	2012	
Muğdat Mosque		Mersin	1988	
New Mosque		Istanbul	1665	Also known as Yeni Cami.
Nuruosmaniye Mosque		Istanbul	1755	Commissioned by Mahmut I, completed during the reign of Osman III
Ortaköy Mosque		Istanbul	1854	Officially the Büyük Mecidiye Camii. The current mosque was built between 1854 and 1856.
Pertevniyal Valide Sultan Mosque		Istanbul	1872	Ottoman imperial mosque in Istanbul
Pertev Pasha Mosque		Izmit	1579	One of the oldest and most impressive works of architectural art remaining from the Anatolian beyliks.
Red Minaret Mosque	Aksaray Leaning Minaret	Aksaray	1221-1237	built during the reign of Alaeddin Keykubad
Rüstem Pasha Mosque		Istanbul	1563	Commissioned by Rüstem Pasha
Sabancı Mosque		Adana	1998	
Salepçioğlu Mosque		İzmir	1905	Ottoman mosque, built by Salepçizade Hoca Ahmed Efendi.
Selimiye Mosque		Edirne	1575	Commissioned by Selim II
Sultan Ahmed Mosque		Istanbul	1609–1616	Largest mosque in İstanbul, commissioned by Ahmet I
Süleymaniye Mosque		Istanbul	1557	Second largest mosque of Istanbul, commissioned by Süleyman I
Şehzade Mosque		Istanbul	1548	Dedicated to Şehzade Mehmet (son of Suleyman I)
Tarsus Grand Mosque		Tarsus, Mersin	1579	
Üç Şerefeli Mosque		Edirne	1547	Commissioned by Murat II
Yavuz Selim Mosque		Istanbul	1522	Completed during the reign of Suleyman I, bears the name of Selim I
Yıldız Hamidiye Mosque		Istanbul	1886	Ottoman imperial mosque.
Yivli Minaret Mosque		Antalya	1230	Historical mosque built by the Anatolian Seljuk Sultan Kay Qubadh I.
Zagan Pasha Mosque		Balıkesir	1461	
Zeyrek Mosque		Istanbul	Before 1136	

== İzmir ==
The list below contains historical Ottoman mosques in modern-day İzmir, Turkey.

=== The table ===
In the table below the first column shows the name, the second column shows the location, the third column shows the commissioner, the fourth column shows the architect and the fifth column shows the duration of construction.

Name	Dimensions in m	Commissioner	Architect	Years
Hisar Mosque	25x20	Aydınoğlu Yakup Bey		1598
Başdurak Mosque	15x15	Hacı Hüseyin		1652
Kestanepazarı Mosque	20x20	Ahmet Ağa		1668
Yalı Mosque	10x10	Ayşe Hanım		1755
Salepçioğlu Mosque	15x20	Salepçizade Hacı Ahmet Efendi		1905

=== Other Ottoman Mosques ===
- Kemeralti (18th century)
- Sadirvan (1636)
- Fazıl Ahmet Pasa (Balık Pazarı) (17th century) (destroyed in 1922 fire)
- Bölük-bası Mehmet Efendi (Hacı Mehmet Efendi) (1661) (destroyed)
- Altı-parmak (1649) (destroyed)
- Acemler (17th century) (destroyed)
- Arnavutoğlu (17th century) (destroyed)
- Hatuniye (17th century)

== See also ==
- List of Turkish Grand Mosques
- Islam in Turkey
- Lists of mosques
- List of mosques in Istanbul
- List of mosques in Europe
- List of mosques in Asia
