= List of mosques in Luxembourg =

This is a list of mosques in Luxembourg.

It is reported that in 2012 by Luxemberg Times, only five mosques in Country and 2015 one mosque is added to list.

Name	Images	Location	Year/century	Remarks
Le Juste Milieu Mosque		Bonnevoie, Luxembourg City	2015	
Mamer Islamic Centre		Mamer		
Mosquée Al Rahma		Niederkorn		
Wiltz Mosque				
Esch-sur-Alzette Mosque		Esch-sur-Alzette		

== See also ==
- Islam in Luxembourg
- Lists of mosques
