= İzzet Pasha Mosque =

Mosque in Elâzığ, Turkey

İzzet Paia Mosque
- İzzet Paşa Camii
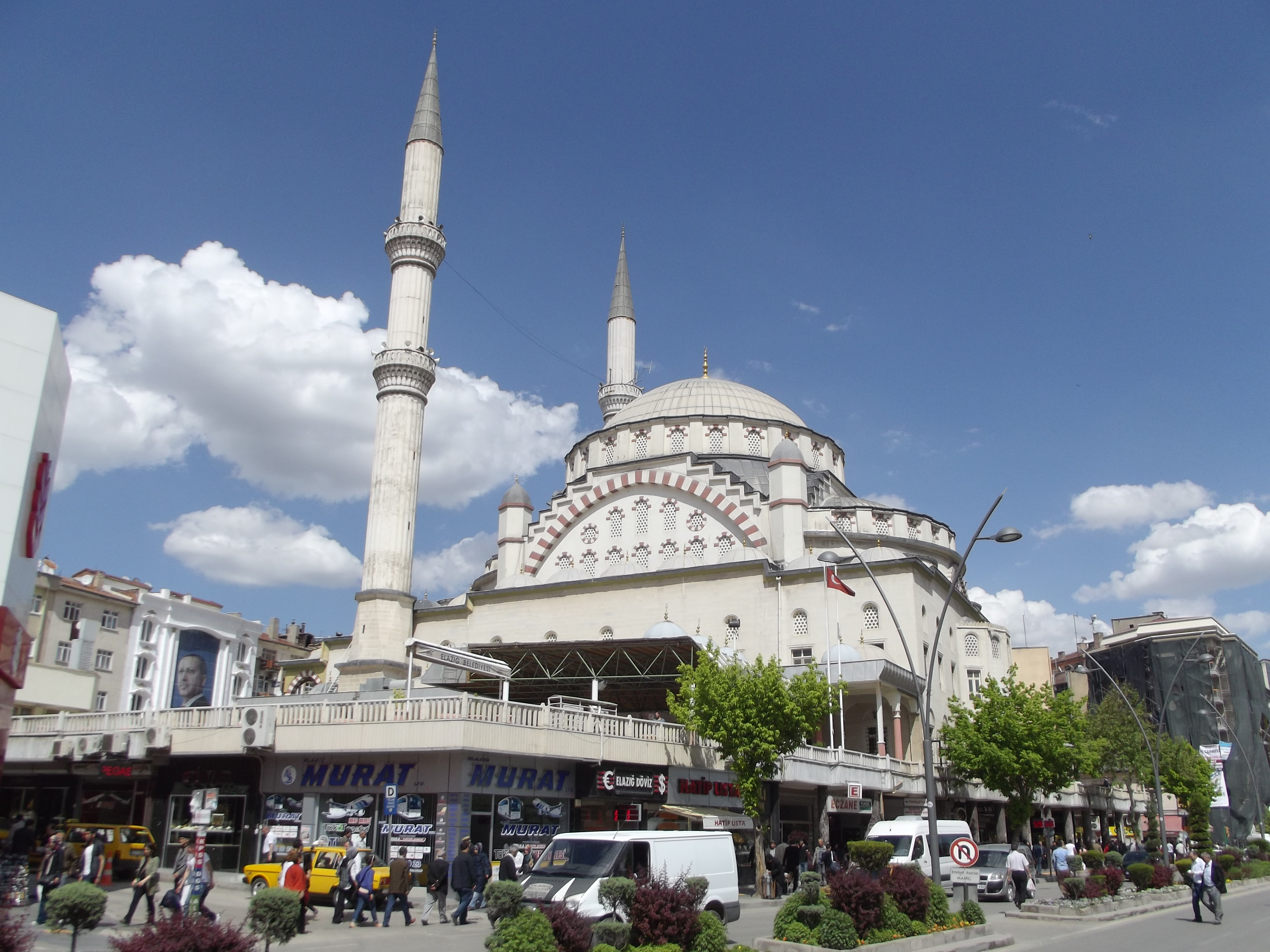

- Location within Turkey

Religion
- Affiliation: Islam

Location
- Municipality: Elazığ
- State: Elazığ Province
- Country: Turkey
- Interactive map of İzzet Paia Mosque
- Coordinates: 38°40′30″N 39°13′26″E

Architecture
- Type: mosque
- Style: Ottoman
- Completed: 1972; 54 years ago

Specifications
- Dome dia. (outer): 20 metres (66 ft)
- Minaret: 2
- Minaret height: 55 metres (180 ft)

The İzzet Paşa Mosque (Turkish: İzzet Paşa Camii) is a mosque in Elazığ, Turkey

It is on Gazi Paşa boulevard of Elazığ. The commissioner of the mosque was Hacı Ahmet İzzet Pasha, the governor of Elazığ during the Ottoman Empire era. It was completed in 1866. It was an abode structure and it could barely withstand aging in a century. In 1967 it was demolished by a İzvak, a foundation established to renew the mosque. In 1972 the mosque was rebuilt and was opened to service. The other dimensions of the mosque are 44 x 28.5 m^{2} (144 x 94 ft^{2}). It also has two porticos with dimensions 8 x 28.5 m^{2} and 4 x 27.15 m^{2}. The diameter of its dome is 20 metres (66 ft) It has two 55 metres (180 ft) minarets. The mosque also houses 115 markets in the ground floor built to provide revenue to sustain the mosque.

== See also ==
- List of mosques in Turkey
