= List of mosques in Scotland =

Mosques located in Scotland

This is a list of mosques in Scotland.

Name	Images	City	Year	Group	Remarks
Dundee Central Mosque		Dundee	2000		Also known as the Jamia Mosque
Edinburgh Central Mosque		Edinburgh	1998	U	Officially known as the King Fahd Mosque and Islamic Centre of Edinburgh
Al-Furqan Mosque		Glasgow	1992		
Glasgow Central Mosque		Glasgow	1983	B	
Aberdeen Mosque and Islamic Centre	AMIC Frederick Street	Aberdeen	1980		This mosque was originally located in Spital Street
Masjid Alhikmah		Aberdeen	2018		
Crown Terrace Mosque		Aberdeen			Also known as Syed Shah Mustafa Jame Masjid

== See also ==
- Islam in the United Kingdom
