= Islam in Southeast Asia =

Muslims in Southeast Asia
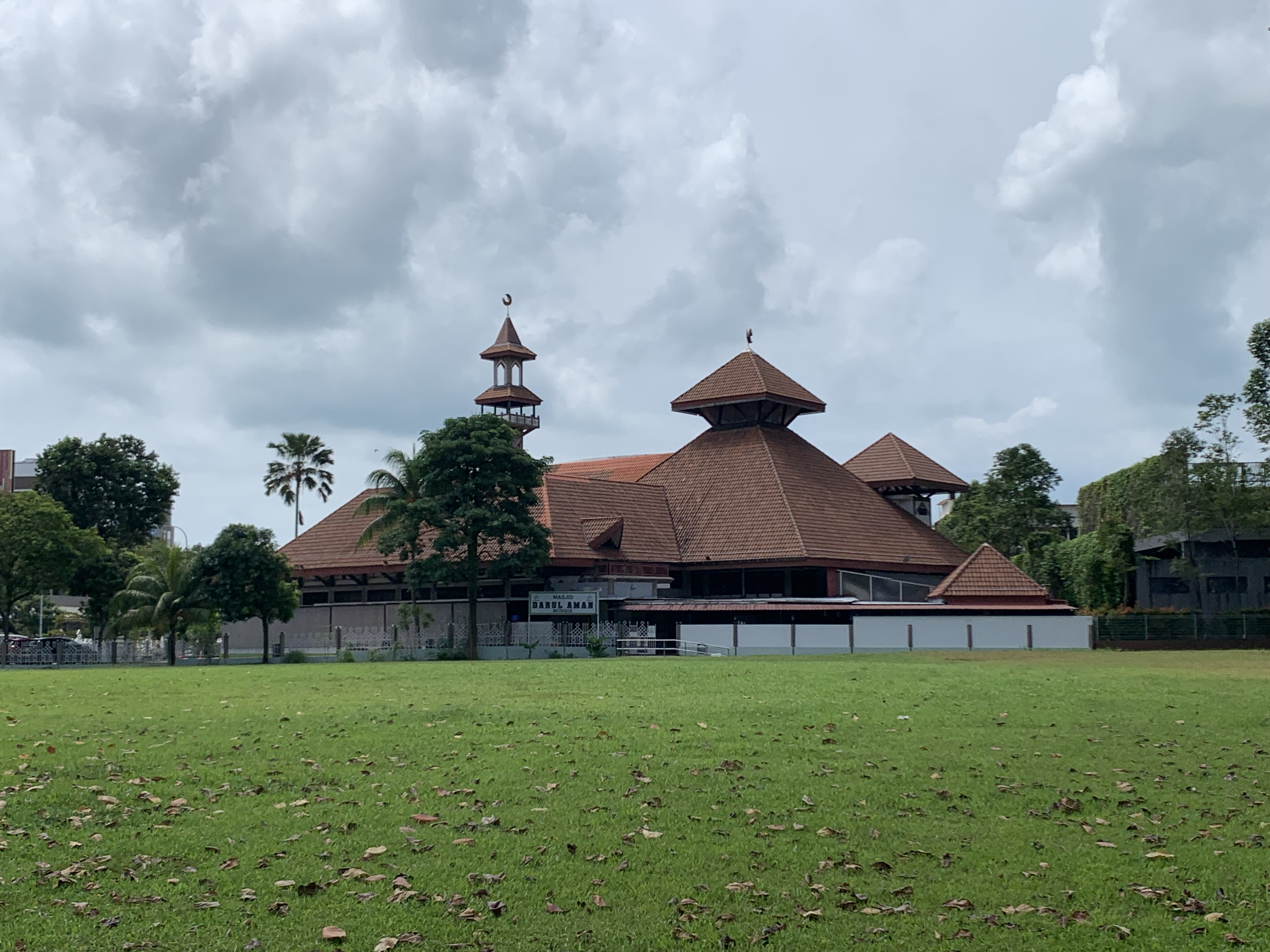
- Masjid Darul Aman in Singapore, using a traditional Malay architecture elements as an exterior

Total population
- 250 million to 280 million(40-42%)

Regions with significant populations
- Indonesia: 245,000,000
- Malaysia: 22,400,000
- Thailand: 7,500,000
- Philippines: 6,981,710
- Myanmar: 2,353,848
- Singapore: ~660,000
- Brunei: 441,000
- Cambodia: 356,000
- Vietnam: 85,452
- Laos: 50,000
- Timor-Leste: 46,500

Religions
- Sunni Islam

Scriptures
- Quran • Hadith • Gheet

Languages
- Liturgical: Quranic Arabic; Common; Indonesian, Javanese, Sundanese, Malay, Tausug, Maguindanao, Maranao, Yakan, Bajau, Melanau, Madurese, Minangkabau, Betawi, Buginese, Banjarese, Acehnese, Sasak, Rohingya, Cham, and other languages of Southeast Asia

Oceania and South East Asia Muslim Population Map

Islam is the most widely practised religion in Southeast Asia with approximately 242 million adherents in the region (about 42% of its population), with majorities in Brunei, Indonesia and Malaysia as well as parts of southern Thailand and parts of Mindanao in the Philippines respectively. Significant minorities are located in the other Southeast Asian states like Singapore and Cambodia. Most Muslims in Southeast Asia are Sunni and follow the Shafi'i school of fiqh, or religious law. It is the official religion in Malaysia and Brunei while it is one of the six recognised faiths in Indonesia.

Islam in Southeast Asia is heterogeneous and is manifested in many different ways. In some places in Southeast Asia, Islam is adapted to coexist syncretically with already-existent local traditions. Mysticism is a defining characteristic of Islam in Southeast Asia, with Sufism having a large regional following. Mystic forms of Islam fit in well with already established traditions. The adaptation of Islam to local traditions is seen as a positive thing by Muslims in Southeast Asia. Islam is part of everyday life for adherents in Southeast Asia and is not separated from "non-religious realms". Southeast Asia is the global region with the highest number of Muslims in the world, surpassing the Middle East and North Africa. Islam in Southeast Asia is neglected in Western study of Islam which centers around the Middle East.

Southeast Asian identity varies by regions that include Brunei, Cambodia, East Timor, Indonesia, Malaysia, Myanmar, the Philippines, Singapore, Thailand, and Vietnam. The heterogeneous nature of Southeast Asia combined with the widely varying practices and meanings of Islam suggests Islam in Southeast Asia has a multitude of variations in practice and belief. Islam in Southeast Asia has been adapted into varying local norms across Southeast Asia. The Abangan are the dominant group of Muslims in Indonesia. The practices of the Abangan are heavily influenced by mysticism and embody a unique form of Islamic practice that incorporates rituals inherited from their pre-Islamic ancestors.

== History ==
=== Earliest Muslim traders into Southeast Asia ===
Muslim traders have been visiting and residing in Southeast Asia as early as the 7th century, mainly through the port town of Barus, located on the west coast of Sumatra, modern day Indonesia. Dutch historian, J. C. Van Leur, estimated that Arab colonies were already formed in Barus by 674. Further evidence is the tombstone of Syekh Rukunuddin, who died in 672. These findings convinced the Indonesian government to establish Titik Nol (Zero Point) Monument in Barus in 2017, recognizing the city's role in the spread of Islam in Indonesia.

Arab accounts describe Arab ships reaching China by the 9th century, this shows that Muslim interaction would have reached Southeast Asia by this time. In 2017, a group of Japanese archaeologists, while working on a 9th century shipwreck in Quang Ngai, Champa of which is now Vietnam, discovered ceramic shards with inscriptions in Indic script, which refer to a place near what is now Hormuz, Iran. Inscriptions on some fragments end with a pentagram or a hexagram, which led Islamic historian Do Truong Giang to interpret it as the Seal of Solomon.

According to Edward H. Schafer, there are several passages in Chinese chronicles compiled during the Five Dynasties and Ten Kingdoms period (907–979) that mention some Islamic activities in the Champa Kingdom during the 10th century. The Chinese described that "the customs of the Chams are identical as those of the Dashi (Tajik)" and "the Cham king, whenever he goes out, he wears a large shirt of Arab brocade or Sichuan brocade." An excerpt recorded in the Song Huiyao Jigao notes the practice of dhabīḥah (ritual slaughter) among the Chams:

[In Champa] There are also mountain cattles, but they cannot be used for ploughing. They are only killed in sacrifice to the spirits. When they are about to be slaughtered, a medium is instructed to offer prayers, which sound thus: Allahu Akbar. In translation, this means: "May he be early reborn."

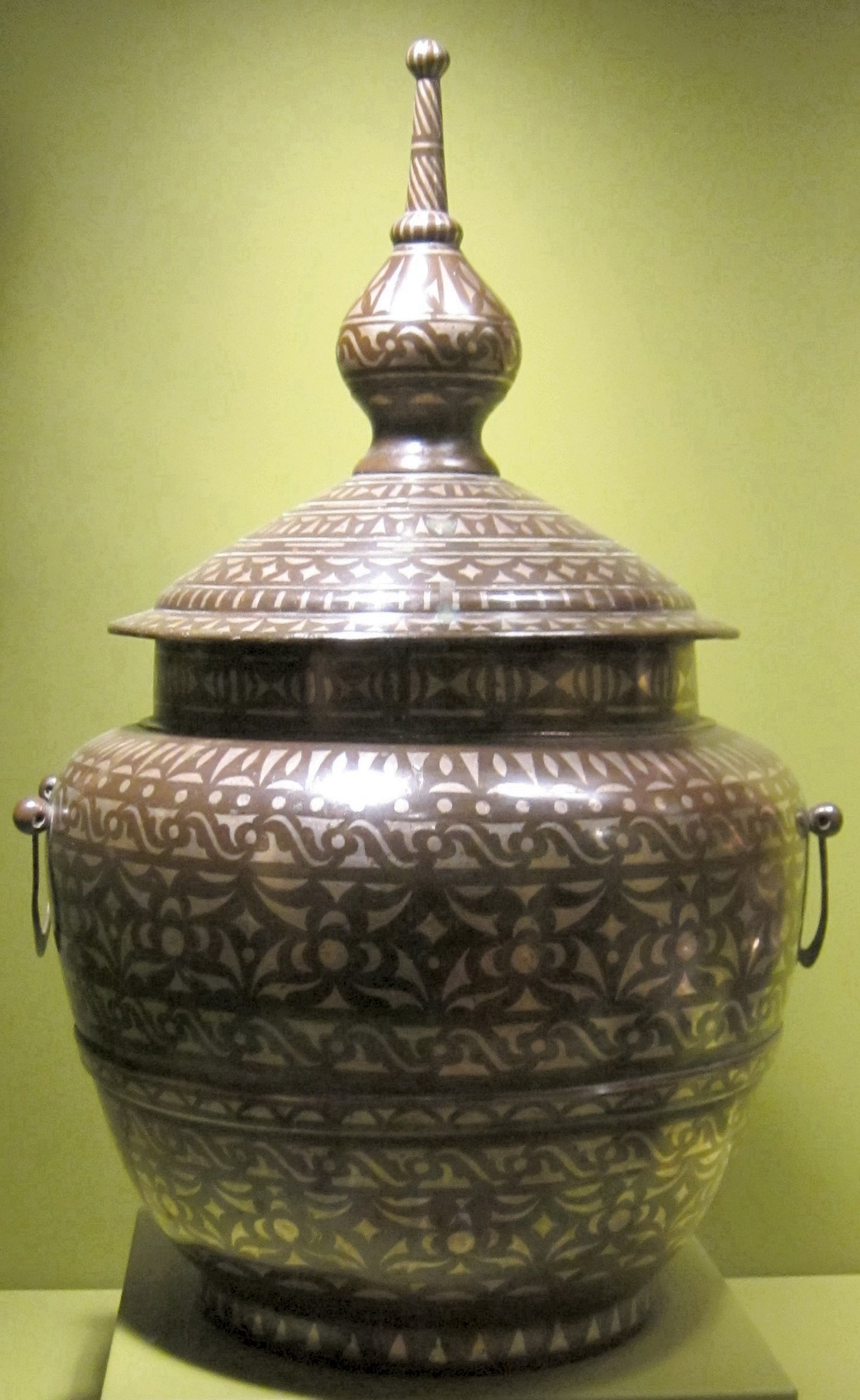
A Muslim "Food jar" from the Philippines, also known as gadur, well known for its brass with silver inlay.

=== Earliest Islamic foothold in Southeast Asia ===
Muslim traders along the main trade-route between Western Asia and the Far East are thought to have been responsible for the introduction of Islam to Southeast and East Asia. The religion was then further spread by Sufi orders and finally consolidated by the expansion of the territories of converted rulers and their communities.

The first local Muslim conversions arose in Aceh in Northern Sumatra, with the establishment of the Peureulak Sultanate in the 9th century which is considered to be the oldest Islamic sultanate in Southeast Asia. Established around 840, even before Samudera Pasai, the sultanate played an important role in the history of Islam in the archipelago. As one of the early centers of Islamic development in this region, the sultanate became the gateway for Islam to enter through trade routes involving Arab, Persian, and Indian traders. The rulers brought scholars and missionaries into the city, mostly Shi'ites from Iran which taught them the basic tenets of Islam, though a later ruler Alaiddin Abbas Shah (888–913) sought to curb Shi'ism for a stronger Sunni influence.

There is no clear indication of when Islam first penetrated the region, but the first Muslim inscriptions have been dated to 1028 was found in Pahang, Malaysia. An Arabic pillar inscription dating between 1029 and 1035 was discovered in Champa, modern-day Vietnam, followed by an Arabic gravestone of one Abu Ibrahim dating 1039, also in Champa. Then an Arabic engraving from Brunei dated to 1048, marking the tomb of a Muslim woman. In East Java, a 1082 or 1102 tombstone of a Muslim woman named Fatimah binti Maimun was also discovered, but these are meant generally believed to mark foreign and not locally born Muslims.

Chinese sources record the presence of a Muslim delegation to the emperor from the Kingdom of Samudra (Pasai) in 1282, other accounts provide instances of Muslim communities present in the Melayu Kingdom for the same period, while others record the presence of Muslim Chinese traders from provinces such as Fujian. When Marco Polo visited the area in 1292 he noted that the urban port state of Perlak was Muslim. The Terengganu Inscription Stone has been dated to either 1303 or 1387 (due to damage on the stone).

There are no credible sources to show where and when the first significant local conversions occurred. However, existing evidence suggest it to be in North Sumatra, there is evidence of local Muslim communities emerging here in the late 13th century. When Ibn Batutta visited Samudra Pasai in 1345, he noted that people in the ports were Muslim but those in the interior were 'pagans', showing a dual situation where cosmopolitan ports were largely Muslim but the vast hinterland were not.

Over time a series of Muslim port villages emerged on the scarcely populated coast. Islamic teachers from these port villages ventured to the interior of Sumatra. Over time these ports attracted Muslims from India, China, and the Arabian peninsula. These communities surpassed their utilitarian functions for trade and were integrated into the global network of Islam. Islam was popular in Southeast Asia because it, unlike previous belief systems, could be used to validate a ruler's power through the divine. The introduction of Islam throughout Southeast Asia and the Indonesian archipelago was an uneven, gradual and relatively pacific process that was heavily influenced by trade and interactions with merchants and Sufi missionaries.

=== Further Islamic expansions, 15th century–18th century ===
The semi-historical late-18th or early-19th century work Hikayat Merong Mahawangsa stated that Phra Ong Mahawangsa, the King of Kedah, became the first ruler to abandon the traditional Hindu faith and converted to Islam with the Sultanate of Kedah established in year 1136. Though historian Richard O. Winstedt states, this date goes against an Acehnese account which states that the Kedah sultan was only converted in 1474.

Ma Huan travelling in 1416 remarked most Chinese living in Java were Muslim from Southern China. By the end of the 15th century, several areas of northern Sumatra, including what is now Java, were governed by Muslim rulers. It wasn't until 1641 that the first sultan took their title in what is now Java.

In the early 15th century, Parameswara, the first Sultan of Malacca, married the princess of Pasai, and their son converted to Islam. However, another source instead mentions that the first conversion of Islam is by Parameswara himself, not his son, he then adopted the name Muhammad Iskandar Shah after his marriage to a daughter of the ruler of Pasai. Soon Malacca became the centre of Islamic study and maritime trade; other rulers followed suit.

In 1511, the Portuguese took over Malacca, but various other Muslim states began to grow in size and economic and political prominence. For example, Aceh dominated the region, both politically and economically, in the early 17th century. Through familial and trade relationships in these Muslim states, non-Islamic states were because of this slowly exposed to the faith. As it spread, Islam encountered pre-existing spiritual beliefs—including Buddhism and Hinduism—which continued to be practiced alongside Islam or were incorporated into Islam. Indeed, the faith introduced by some of the religious merchants was Sufism, a mystical version of Islam that is rejected by more conservative Muslims. Islamic law was also formally practiced in most areas that had encountered Islam, affecting cultural practices.

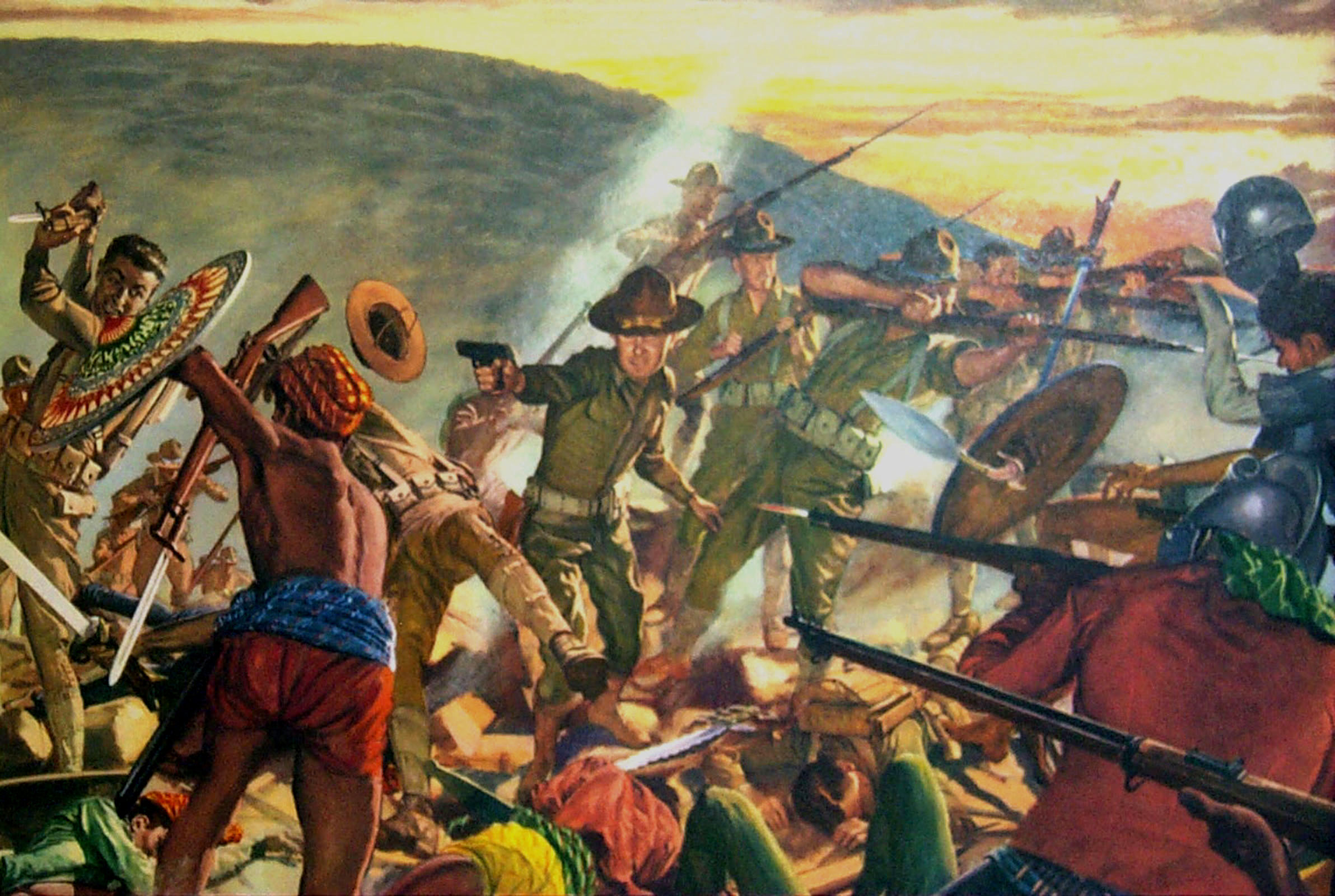
Moro Rebellion against the United States military during the Philippine–American War in 1913

By the time the Europeans and their missionaries arrived in the region in the 17th century, the region, including New Guinea, was overwhelmed by Muslims with animist minorities. However actual accounts by foreigners mentioned otherwise: Tome Pires in 1515 says three quarters of the population were still 'heathens' in North Moluccas while in 1621 a Dutch resident mentioned there were no more than 300 Muslims in Ambon.

The most intense period of Islamization occurred between 1570–1630, during this time there was direct commercial, religious and military contact with the Ottoman Caliphate and Mecca. By 1500, Islam had spread to present-day Selangor, Terengganu, North Sumatra and Northern East Java, by 1600 it spread throughout the entire coastal Malay Peninsular, coastal Sumatra and North Java, while by 1700 Islam had spread into even the interior of Sumatra, Java and both coastal Kalimantan and Sulawesi.

=== Process of Islamization ===
There are several theories and factors that have been proposed to explain the Islamisation process of Southeast Asia. The first is trade. The expansion of trade among West Asia, India and Southeast Asia helped the spread of the religion as Muslim traders brought Islam to the region. Muslim merchants from various regions in India and West Asia played a pivotal role in establishing Islam in Southeast Asia. A second theory is the role of the Sufis. The Sufi missionaries played a significant role in spreading the faith by syncretising Islamic ideas with existing local beliefs and religious notions. Thirdly, the ruling classes embraced Islam which further aided the permeation of the religion throughout the region. The ruler of the region's most important port, Malacca Sultanate, embraced Islam in the 15th century, heralding a period of accelerated conversion of Islam throughout the region as the religion provided a unifying force among the ruling and trading classes. The word daulat refers to the legitimacy of a ruler, through the power of God, and suggests the strong relationship between rule, legitimacy, and the spread of Islam. A less influential factor for Islamisation was due to conquest. While mostly done for economic and territorial expansion, conquests could have led to eventual conversions after the establishment of an Islamized kingdom, which often deployed missionaries and created religious infrastructure to aid in converting the newly acquired populations.

The spread of Islam to Southeast Asia also depended largely on the translation and availability of religious texts. This was largely through Malay, a language that transected class. There are also a number of works in Javanese, particularly related to Javanese-Islamic mysticism. Some of the most significant Malay authors that helped in this translation are Hamzah Fansuri, Shams al-Din, and 'Abd al-Ra-uf.

== Islam in Modern Southeast Asia ==
Muslims in Southeast Asia come from a variety of ethnic groups and backgrounds and speak a number of different languages, including Thai, Burmese, Malay, Marano, Tausug, Bahasa Indonesia, Javanese, and Chinese. Daily practices vary among countries and different regions within each country. Many of these differences relate to government policies and also on whether Muslims make up the majority or minority of the country's population.

Islam in Southeast Asia is multi-faceted and multi-layered. Different interpretations of the faith have resulted in a variety of groups. In Indonesia, there is the Nahdlatul Ulama, which preaches closely to the Shafi`i school of legal accretion, and the Muhammadiyah, whose outlook is a blend of modernist ideals with Islamic thoughts. Along with these two major groups, other Islamic groups also played an important role in Indonesian society, politics and economy, with their followers forming Islamic civil groups and political parties.

Istiqlal Mosque, Jakarta

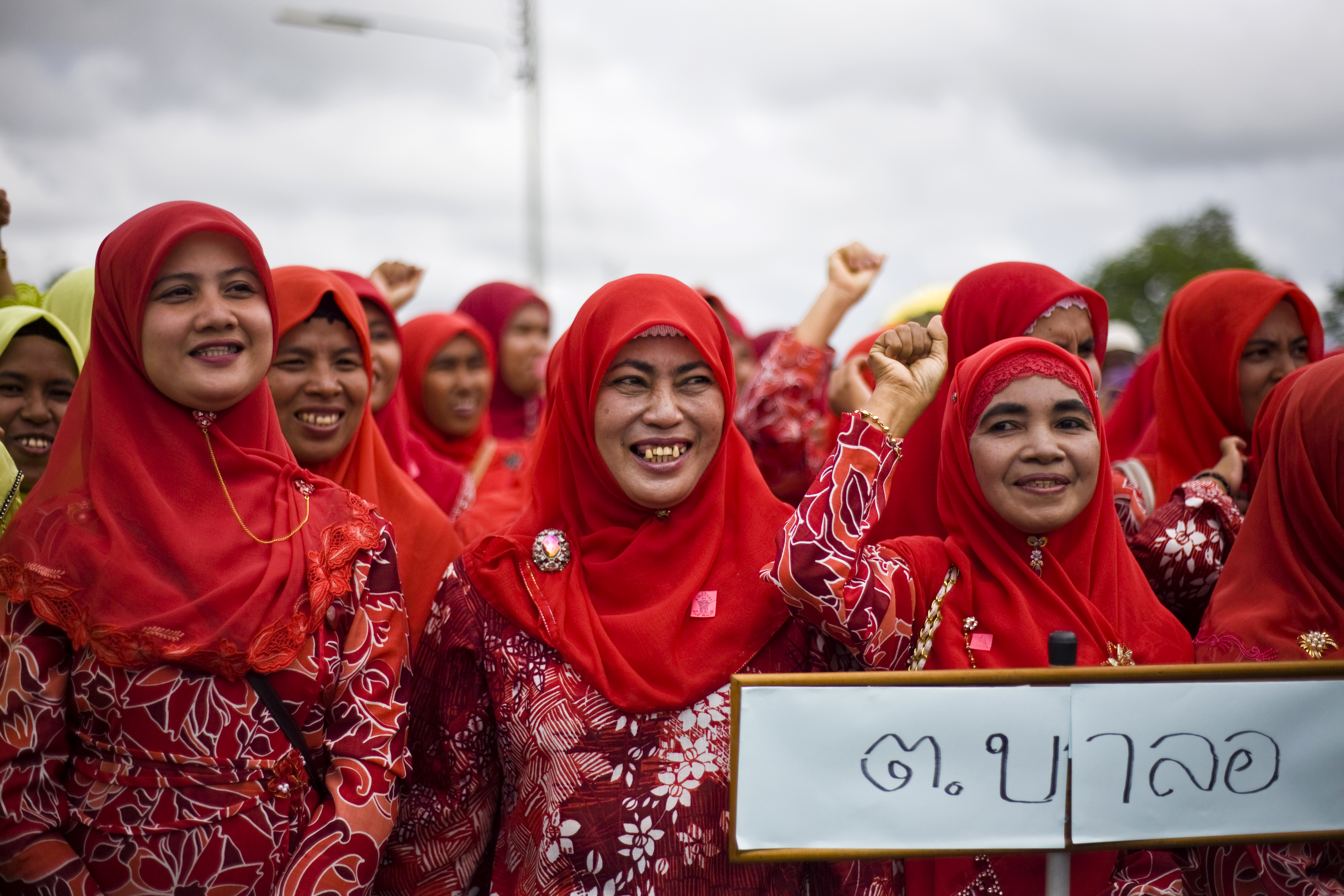
Thai Malays

Despite these differences, there are still common traditions practiced among many Muslims in Southeast Asia. For example, the five duties of Islam (Faith, Prayer, Charity, Fasting, Pilgrimage) form a foundation for many individuals' faith. Likewise, there are other shared traditions, such as prayer before meals.

In Southeast Asia, Islam influences other aspects daily of life, and there is a close relationship among religion, nation, and ethnicity. For example, there are an increasing number of private Islamic schools, which often combine Islamic religion, culture, and life. Likewise, medicine in Southeast Asia draws on a number of traditions, often combining animism, tibbun (which contains pre-Islamic elements), and hikmah (which is based upon a lineage of Muslim scholars and influenced modern biomedical practice). Islamic banks are also founded on Islamic principles and, for example, do not charge interest.

Islam has intersected with other religious practices in Southeast Asia in many different ways. For example, jinn, which indicates Islamic spiritual beings, has come to include Javanese spirits, as well. In countries such as Indonesia, in particular, animist traditions (as well as the traditions of other faiths, like Hindu and Buddhism) have become integral to the practice of Islam. Sufism has also shaped Islam in many Southeast Asian countries.

=== Islamic revivalism ===
Since the late 1970s, an Islamic resurgence is taking place in the region. Dakwah movements mushroomed throughout Southeast Asia. These movements, in general, aim to create a strong Islamic identity among the Muslims and are understood as a response to changes in society and values. These movements have been referred to as "revivalism," "revitalisation," "resurgence," "renewal," and "Islamisation". As a result, Islam began to assume a larger role in public life, underlined by the increased donning of headscarves among Muslim women, for one example. Economic growth resulted in modest affluence which has translated into more religious investments like the Hajj and Islamic literature.

The Malaysian government promotes Islam through its Islamisation policies covering society, economics and education and, most recently, Islam Hadhari. Some of these movements have reflected a perceived tension between modernity and tradition, and they reflect movements taking place at the same time in other regions, like the Middle East. For example, Southeast Asian scholars who traveled to the Middle East during the early 1900s brought back ideas from the Modernist movement. In Indonesia, there are two large Muslim organisations. One, Muhammadiyah, is associated with this Modernist movement while the other, Nahdlatul Ulama, is a more traditional organisation meant to oppose the values of Modernism.

In today's modern age, Muslims interact with global technology, consumerism, and ideas in a variety of ways while practicing their faith. For some, this has resulted in an increase in religiosity and the observation of traditions such as Islamic devotional practices and fasting during Ramadan.

=== Pilgrimage ===
Muslims in Southeast Asia have performed pilgrimages to Mecca since the 17th century as pilgrimage to the Holy Cities of Mecca and Medina is one of the Five Pillars of Islam. The Hajj was made easier by the advent of the steamship in the 19th century. As the Hajj became more popular throughout Southeast Asia, Arabic and the Arabian brand of Islam were integrated further into the lives of Muslims in Southeast Asia. Through travel to Arab countries—for the Hajj-pilgrimage or religious study—Muslims in Southeast Asia have also undertaken the translation of Islamic texts into local languages. Southeast Asia has rich and poor countries and this differences are reflected when wealthy people from Singapore and Brunei staying in comfortable hotels near the main mosque while Cambodians reported staying on the floor of a single room shared by 45 people in a dormitory two miles away.

Cornell professor Eric Tagliacozzo interviewed Muslim Southeast Asians Hajj pilgrims, he reported that most respondents said there was no racism and ethnocentrism in Mecca but some reported that Southeast Asian women reported feeling "physically smaller" and "pushed around" by people from all over the world including Tanzanians, Chechens, Afghans and Nigerians while circumambulating the Kaabah. Others felt that Arabs treated their women very badly in Mecca and believed Southeast Asians "did it better".

=== Persecution and terrorism ===
The division of countries during colonialism divided some ethnic and religious groups, leading to several minority Muslim populations to live at the periphery of countries. Various organisations, like the Muslim World League, have advocated for the rights of these minority populations. There is a history in some countries of persecution of Muslims, including the ongoing ethnic cleansing of the Rohingya in Myanmar or the long struggle of the Muslim Moro.

Finally, the war on terrorism, particularly since 9/11, has influenced modern Islam in Southeast Asia. Many governments in the region have joined antiterrorist coalitions or signed antiterrorist pacts. In some countries, such as the Philippines, the U.S. has sent troops to combat specific terrorist groups associated with Islamic extremism, such as the Islamic State.

== Female Genital Mutilation ==
External images
- FGM ceremony in Indonesia
- Preparations
- Girl before procedure
- Nine-month-old afterwards — Stephanie Sinclair (The New York Times Magazine, April 2006)

According to William Clarence-Smith, Islamic Southeast Asia "overwhelmingly" follows the Shafi`i school of law, the only one to make FGM obligatory. The greatest opposition in the area, he writes, is from syncretic Muslims in Java; some practitioners use the root of the turmeric plant to perform an alternative symbolic procedure.

Islam introduced FGM into Indonesia and Malaysia from the 13th century on. Over 80 percent of Malaysian women claim religious obligation as the primary reason for practising FGM, along with hygiene (41 percent) and cultural practice (32 percent). The practice is widespread among Muslim women in Indonesia. In 2013 the Indonesian Ulema Council, Indonesia's top Muslim clerical body, ruled that it favours FGM, stating that although it is not mandatory, it is "morally recommended". The Ulema has been pushing the Indonesian government to circumcise girls, arguing that it is part of Islamic teachings. In 2017, future vice president Ma'ruf Amin, then the council's general chair, said that FGM must not be outlawed, saying that it is an Islamic teaching that must be adhered.

In July 2024, Indonesia criminalized all forms of FGM after it repealed exceptions to the laws.

=== Prevalence ===
Country	( %)	Legal status of religion	Sources
Brunei	82.1	Sunni Islam	
Cambodia	2.1	Buddhism	
Indonesia	87.0	Secular (Note: Promotes (Pancasila ideology), and only 6 religions( Islam, Buddhism and Hinduism, as well as both Catholic and Protestant Christianity) are officially recognized.)	
Laos	0.12	Secular	
Malaysia	63.5	Sunni Islam	
Myanmar	5.4 (Note: Rohingya Muslims (majorly residing Rakhine)are not counted as citizen of Myanmar, since 1982)		
Philippines	6.0	Secular	
Singapore	15.6	Secular	
Timor-Leste	3.6	Secular	
Thailand	12.0	Secular	
Vietnam	0.20	Secular	

== See also ==
- Muslim Southeast Asia
- Islam in Indonesia
- Islam in Brunei
- Islam in Malaysia
- Islam in Singapore
- Islam in the Philippines
- Islam in Thailand
- Islam in Myanmar
- Islam in Cambodia
- Islam in Vietnam
- Islam in Laos
