= Lists of mosques =

Lists of mosques cover mosques, places of worship for Muslims. These lists are primarily arranged by continent, with the exception of lists for the largest, tallest, and oldest mosques.

== Asia ==
- List of mosques in Afghanistan
- List of mosques in Armenia
- List of mosques in Azerbaijan
- List of mosques in Bahrain
- List of mosques in Bangladesh
- List of mosques in Brunei
- List of mosques in Cambodia
- List of mosques in China
  - List of mosques in Hong Kong
- List of mosques in Cyprus
- List of mosques in India
- List of mosques in Indonesia
- List of mosques in Iran
- List of mosques in Iraq
- List of mosques in Israel
- List of mosques in Japan
- List of mosques in Jordan
- List of mosques in Kazakhstan
- List of mosques in Kyrgyzstan
- List of mosques in Kuwait
- List of mosques in Laos
- List of mosques in Lebanon
- List of mosques in Malaysia
- List of mosques in the Maldives
- List of mosques in Nepal
- List of mosques in North Korea
- List of mosques in Oman
- List of mosques in Pakistan
- List of mosques in Palestine
- List of mosques in the Philippines
- List of mosques in Qatar
- List of mosques in Saudi Arabia
- List of mosques in Singapore
- List of mosques in South Korea
- List of mosques in Sri Lanka
- List of mosques in Syria
- List of mosques in Taiwan
- List of mosques in Tajikistan
- List of mosques in Thailand
- List of mosques in Turkey
- List of mosques in Turkmenistan
- List of mosques in the United Arab Emirates
- List of mosques in Uzbekistan
- List of mosques in Vietnam
- List of mosques in Yemen

== Africa ==
- List of mosques in Africa
  - List of mosques in Algeria
  - List of mosques in Benin
  - List of mosques in Cameroon
  - List of mosques in Djibouti
  - List of mosques in Egypt
  - List of mosques in Ghana
  - List of mosques in Guinea
  - List of mosques in Ivory Coast
  - List of mosques in Kenya
  - List of mosques in Libya
  - List of mosques in Mali
  - List of mosques in Mauritania
  - List of mosques in Morocco
  - List of mosques in Niger
  - List of mosques in Nigeria
  - List of mosques in Senegal
  - List of mosques in Sierra Leone
  - List of mosques in Somalia
  - List of mosques in South Africa
  - List of mosques in Tanzania
  - List of mosques in Tunisia

== Americas ==
- Lists of mosques in North America
  - List of mosques in Canada
    - List of mosques in Ottawa–Gatineau
  - List of mosques in Mexico
  - List of mosques in Puerto Rico
  - List of mosques in the United States
- List of mosques in South America
  - List of mosques in Argentina
  - List of mosques in Brazil
  - List of mosques in Paraguay

== Europe ==
- List of mosques in Europe
  - List of mosques in Albania
  - List of mosques in Bosnia and Herzegovina
  - List of mosques in Bulgaria
  - List of mosques in France
  - List of mosques in Germany
  - List of mosques in Georgia
  - List of mosques in Greece
    - List of former mosques in Greece
  - List of mosques in Hungary
  - List of mosques in Luxembourg
  - List of mosques in the Netherlands
  - List of mosques in Russia
  - List of mosques in Scandinavia (Denmark, Sweden, and Norway)
  - List of mosques in Spain
  - List of mosques in Turkey
  - List of mosques in the United Kingdom
    - List of mosques in Scotland

== Oceania ==
- List of mosques in Oceania
  - List of mosques in Australia

== Miscellaneous ==
- List of largest mosques
- List of tallest mosques
- List of the oldest mosques

== See also ==
- Holiest sites in Islam
