= Defterdar Mosque =

Mosque in Eyüp, Istanbul, Turkey

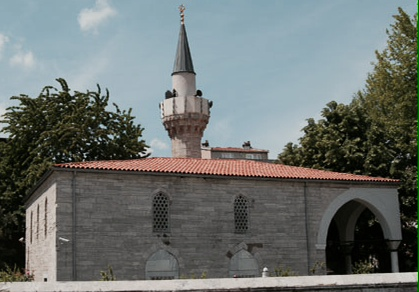

- Location in Istanbul

Religion
- Affiliation: Islam

Location
- Location: Istanbul, Turkey
- Coordinates: 41.042°N 28.9376°E

Architecture
- Architect: Mimar Sinan
- Type: Mosque
- Style: Islamic, Classical Ottoman
- Completed: 1542
- Minaret: 1

The Defterdar Mosque, or the Defterdar Mahmut Efendi Mosque (Turkish: Defterdar Camii, Defterdar Mahmut Efendi Camii), is 16th century Ottoman mosque located in Eyüp, Istanbul, Turkey. It was commissioned by defterdar (chief finance secretary) Nazlı Mahmut Efendi (c. 1500–1546) and built by architect Mimar Sinan in 1542. Instead of a crescent, this mosque has "ink pot and pen" on top of its dome, representing the profession of the founder of the mosque (defterdar derives from defter, 'notebook, register', and the suffix -dar, 'doer'). The original pair was broken by a storm in 1997. Ten years later, on 30 May 2007, a new inkpot and a pen assembled on top of the dome of the mosque.

== Gallery ==
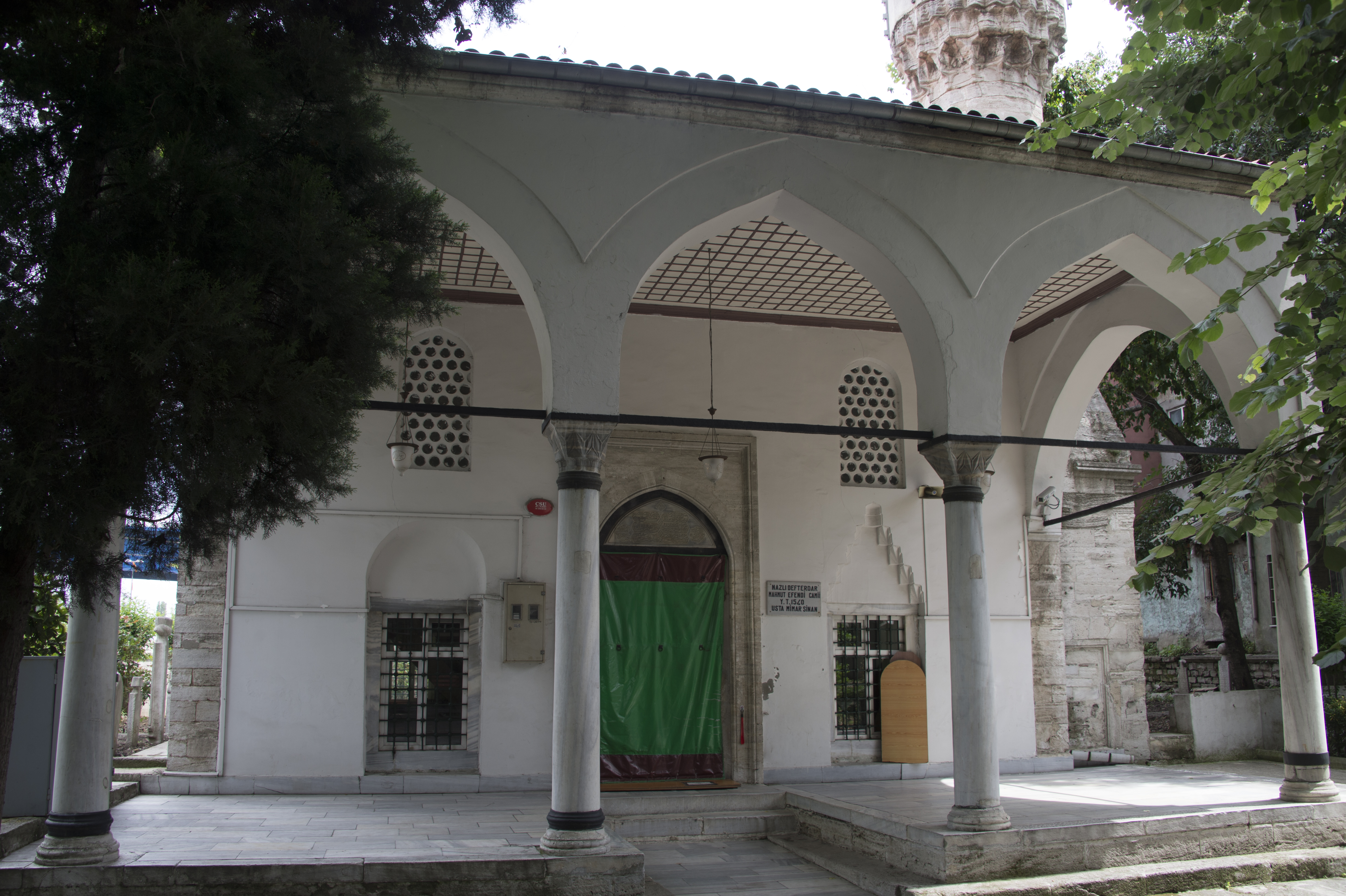
Defterdar Mahmut Efendi Mosque front

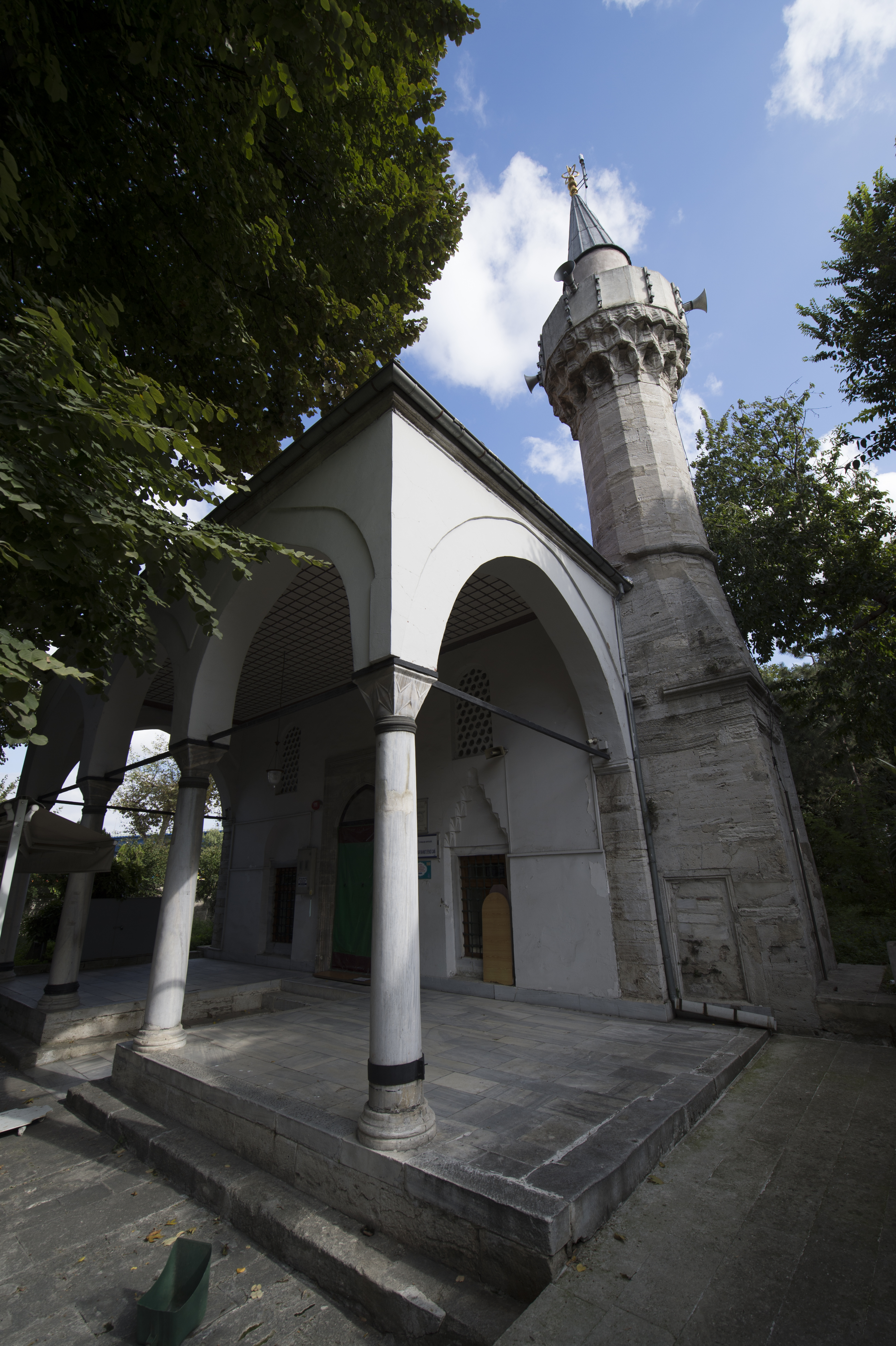
Defterdar Mahmut Efendi Mosque from side with minaret

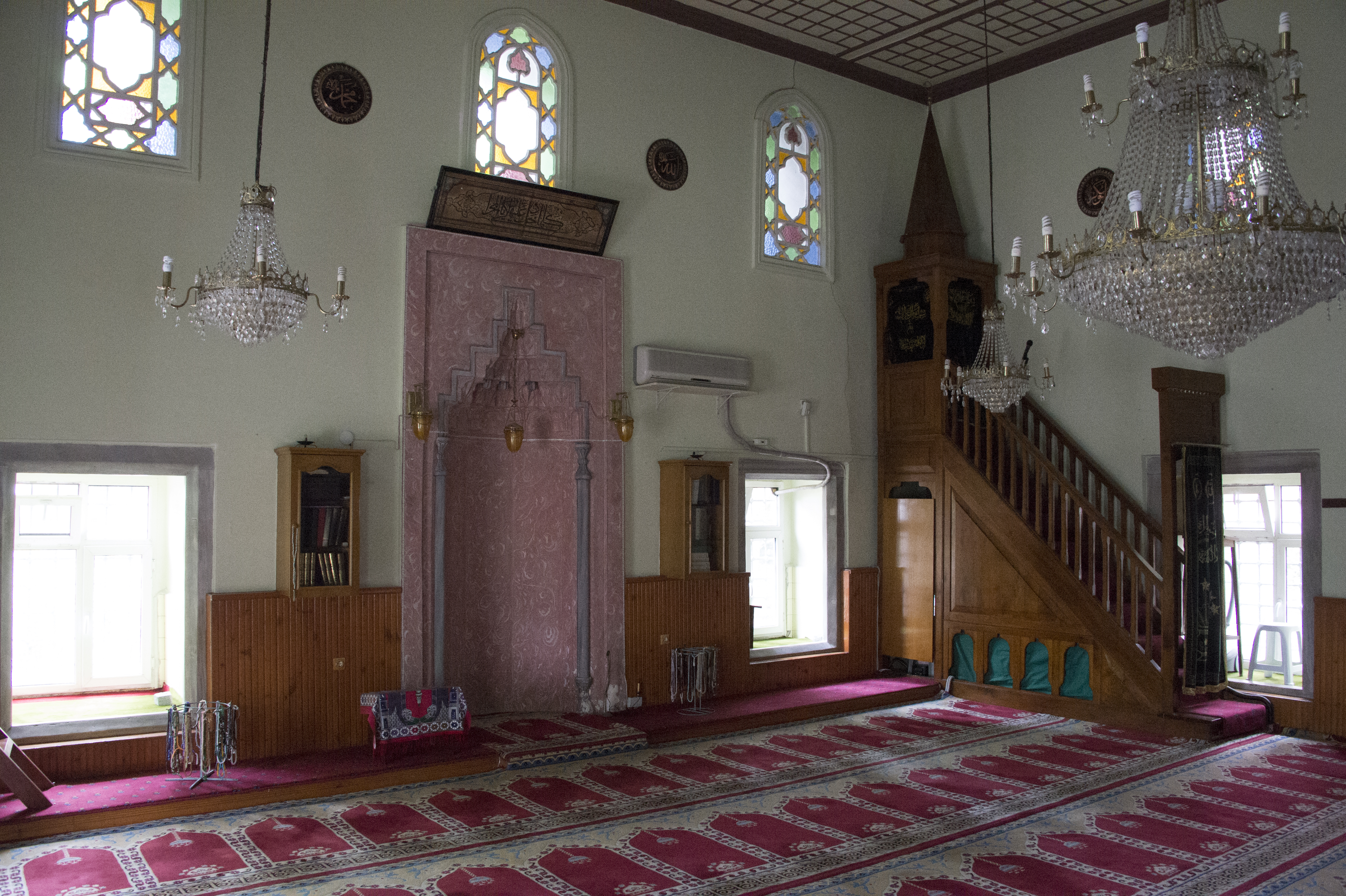
Defterdar Mahmut Efendi Mosque interior

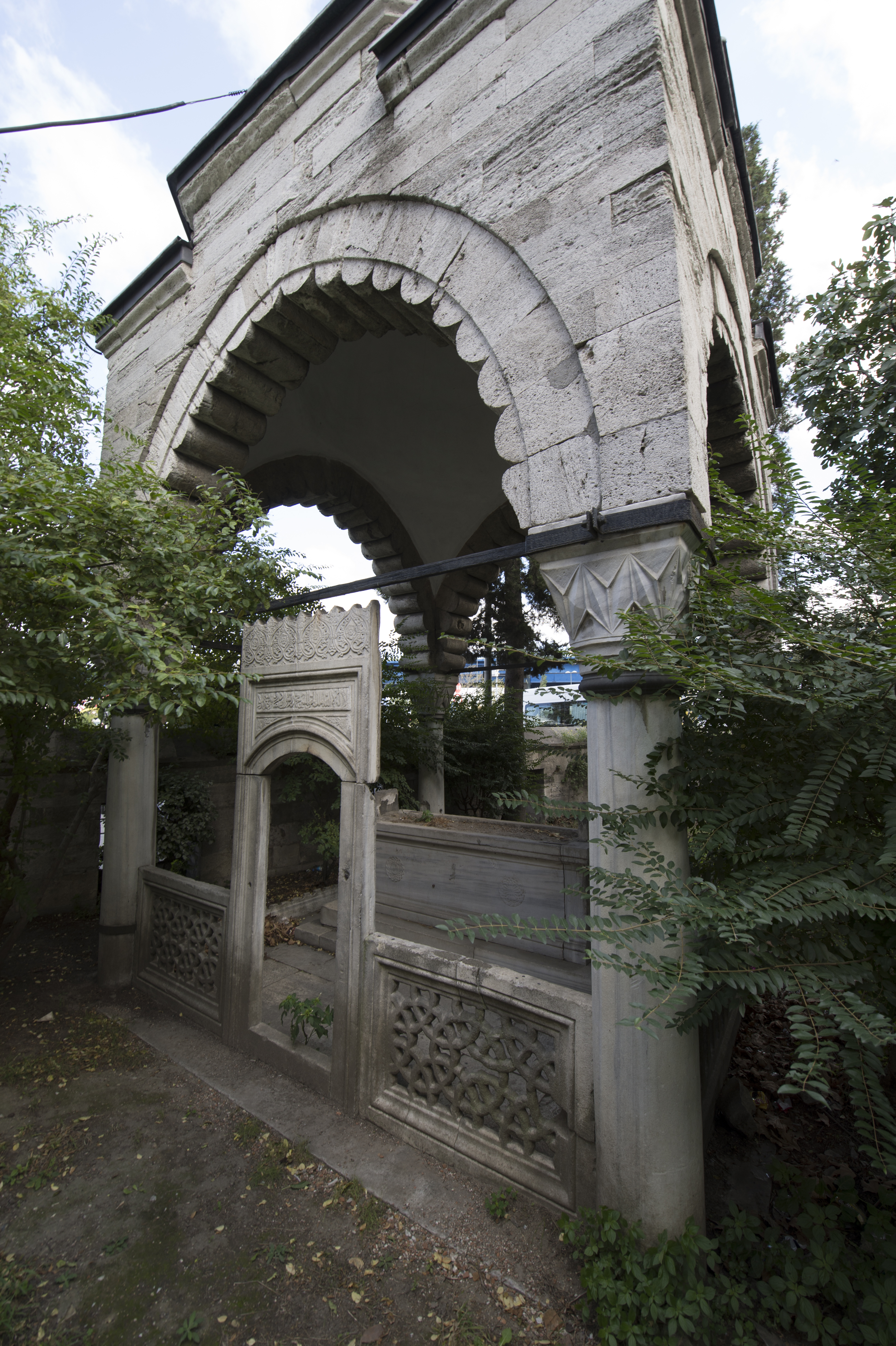
Defterdar Mahmut Efendi Mausoleum

== See also ==
- List of mosques
- Mimar Sinan
- Ottoman architecture
