= Azahar Mosque =

Mosque in Vientiane, Laos

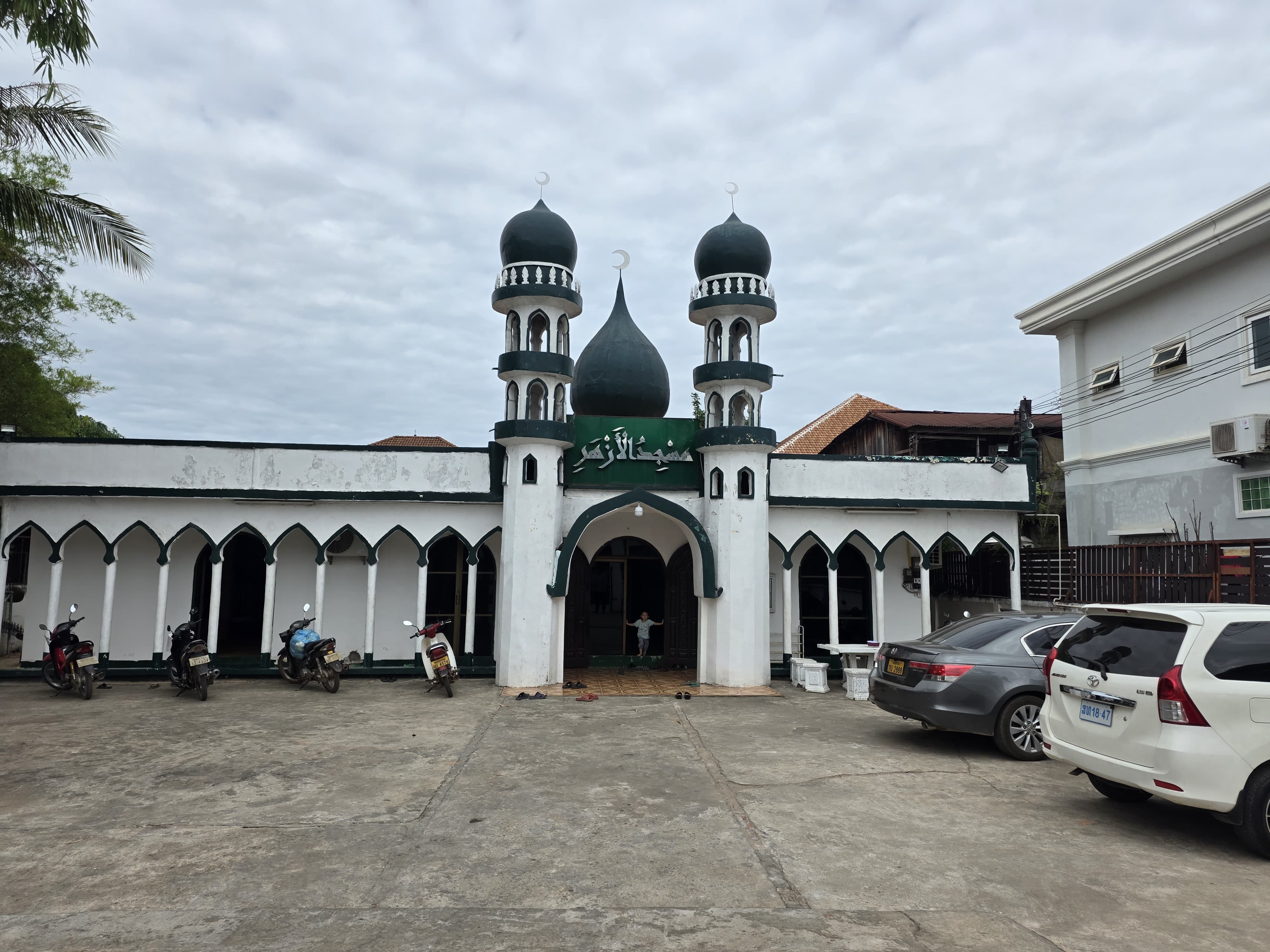
- The mosque in 2025

- Location of the mosque in Laos

Religion
- Affiliation: Sunni Islam
- Sect: Shafi'i school
- Ecclesiastical or organisational status: Mosque
- Leadership: Musa Abu Bakr (Imam)
- Status: Active

Location
- Location: Chanthabuly, Vientiane
- Country: Laos
- Coordinates: 17°58′52.2″N 102°36′02.1″E

Architecture
- Type: Mosque architecture
- Founder: Shafi'i Laotian Chams
- Established: 1976 (as a congregation)
- Groundbreaking: 1976
- Completed: 1986
- Site area: 700 m^{2} (7,500 sq ft)

The Azahar Mosque ( Lao: ມັສຢິດອາສາຮາຣ ), also called the Cambodia Mosque, Masjid Cambodia, or the Cham Mosque, is a Sunni Islamic mosque that worships in the Shafi'i school tradition, located in an obscure part of the Chanthabuly district of Vientiane, Laos.

== History ==
The construction of the mosque started in 1976 and was completed in 1986. It was founded by the Shafi'i adherents of the Laotian Chams who fled Democratic Kampuchea in the 1970s. The Cham community is small, numbering only a few hundred, and is relatively poor. Many of the Chams were persecuted by the Cambodian Khmer Rouge regime from 1975, when their mosques were destroyed, they were forbidden to worship or to speak in the Cham language, and many were forced to keep pigs. They fled to Laos to avoid persecution.

== Architecture ==
The mosque consists of two main buildings, which are the prayer hall and the kuttab (education room). The mosque is painted gold in color for its dome and cream for its wall. The mosque sits in a complex with a total area of 700 m^{2} (7,500 sq ft).

== See also ==
- Islam in Laos
- List of mosques in Laos
