= Başdurak Mosque =

Mosque in İzmir, Turkey

- Başdurak Camii
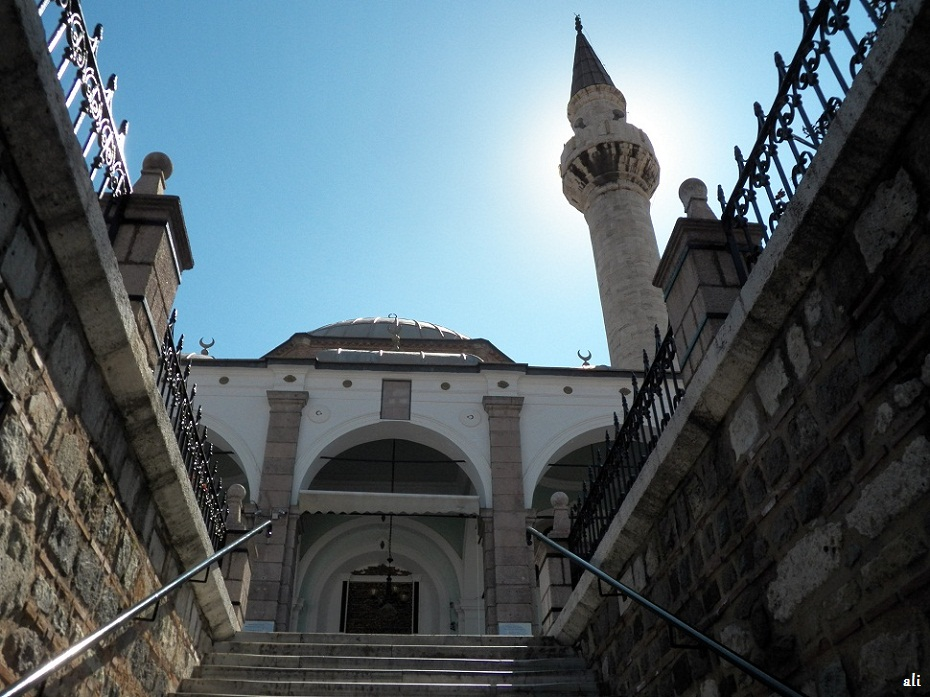

- Location within Turkey

Religion
- Affiliation: Islam

Location
- Location: Ahmetağa, Konak
- Municipality: İzmir
- Country: Turkey
- Interactive map of Başdurak Mosque
- Coordinates: 38°25′06.5″N 27°08′00.5″E

Architecture
- Type: mosque
- Creator: Hacı Hüseyin
- Established: 1652

Başdurak Mosque (Turkish: Başdurak Camii) is a historical Mosque in İzmir, Turkey.

== Building ==
An inscription on the Mosque states that it was built by Hacı Hüseyin. The date of construction is stated as 1652 by the traveler Evliya Çelebi who visited in the 17th century. The Mosque is built on a square platform and has a single large dome at the top. The worship area is located towards the north and the minaret is on the west. It has an adjoining medrese, library and sebil (drinking fountain). A number of shops belonging the neighboring street and market are integrated into its base. The Mosque has been restored a number of times, the last time being 2001.

== Gallery ==
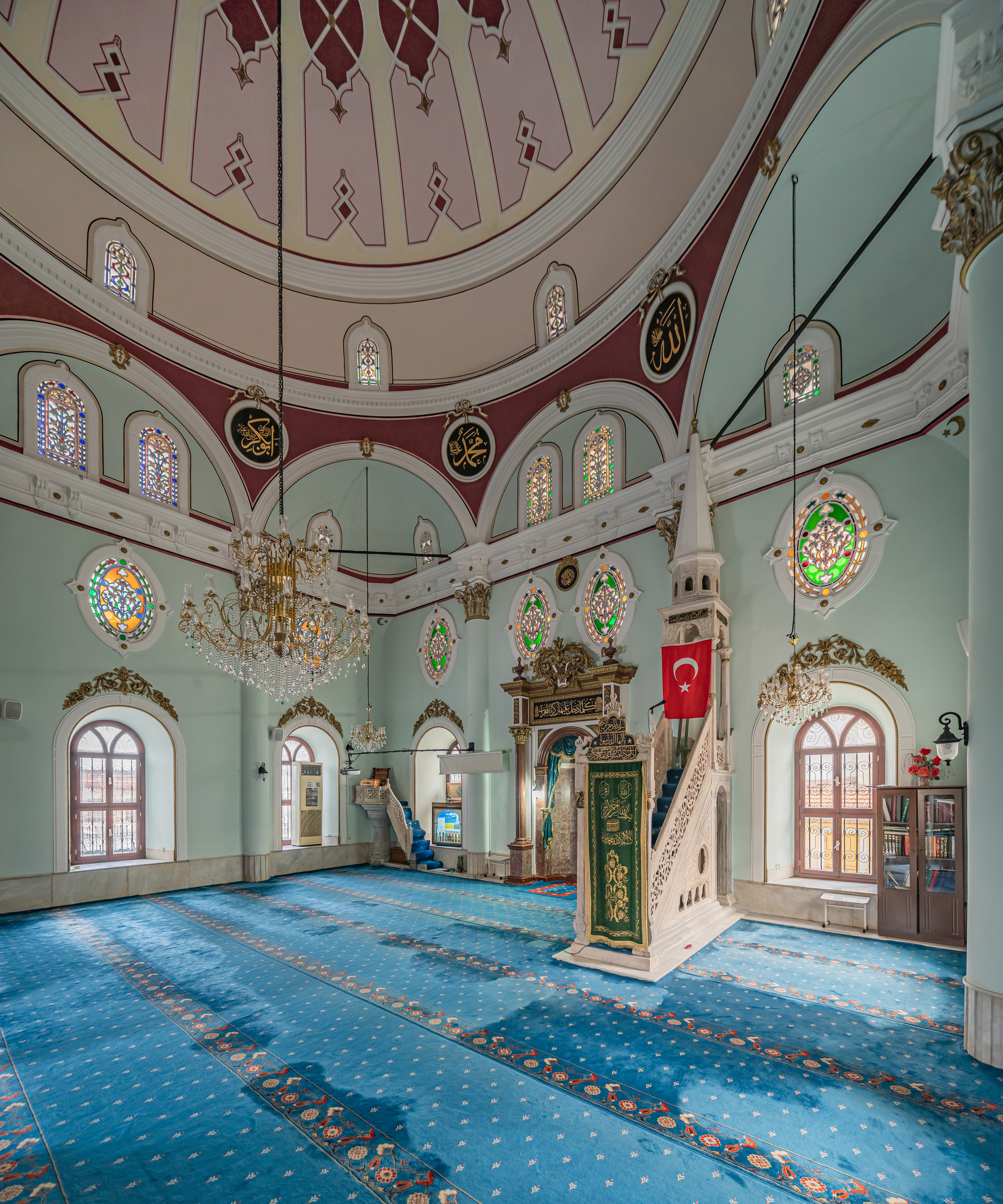
Interior of the mosque

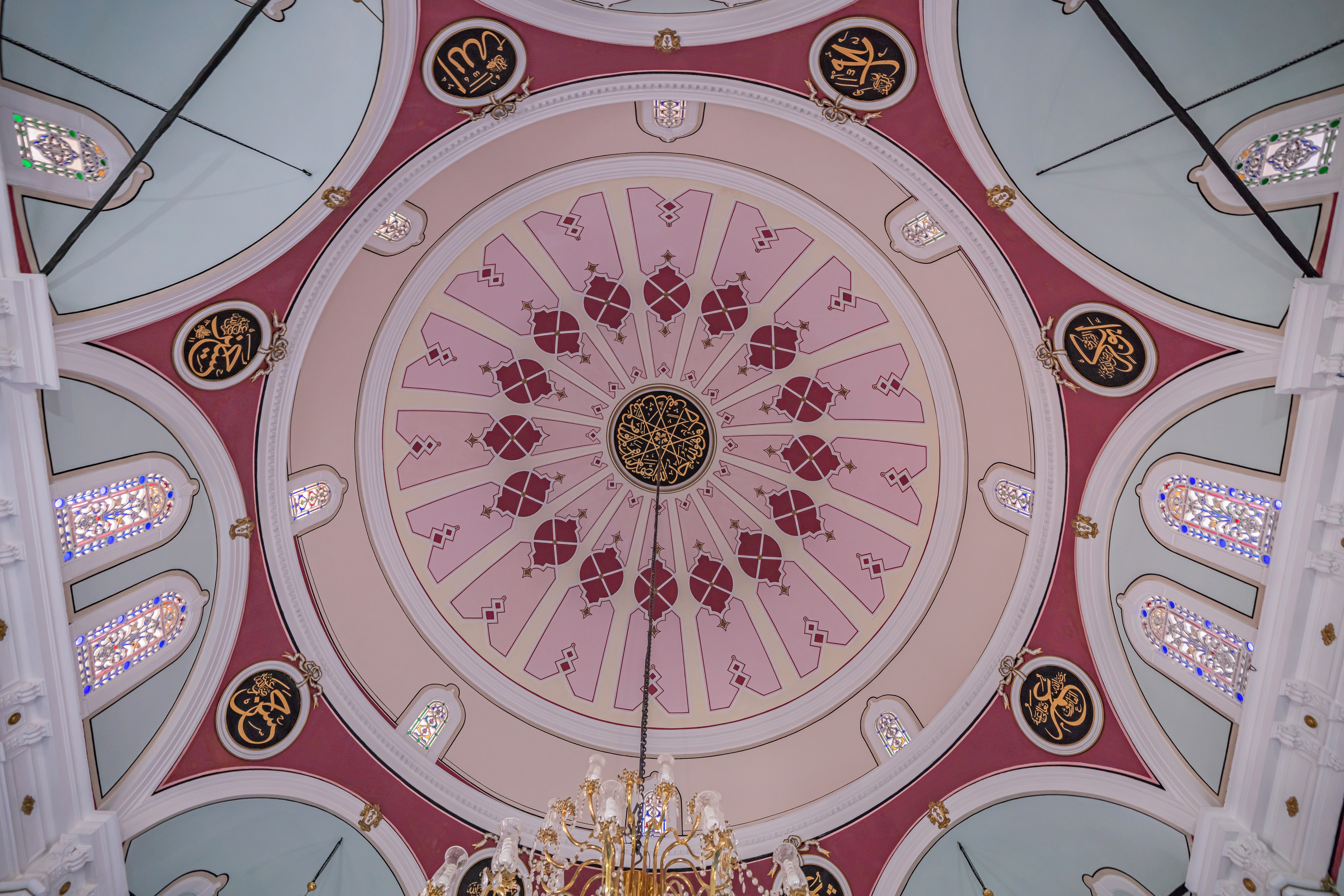
Dome interior

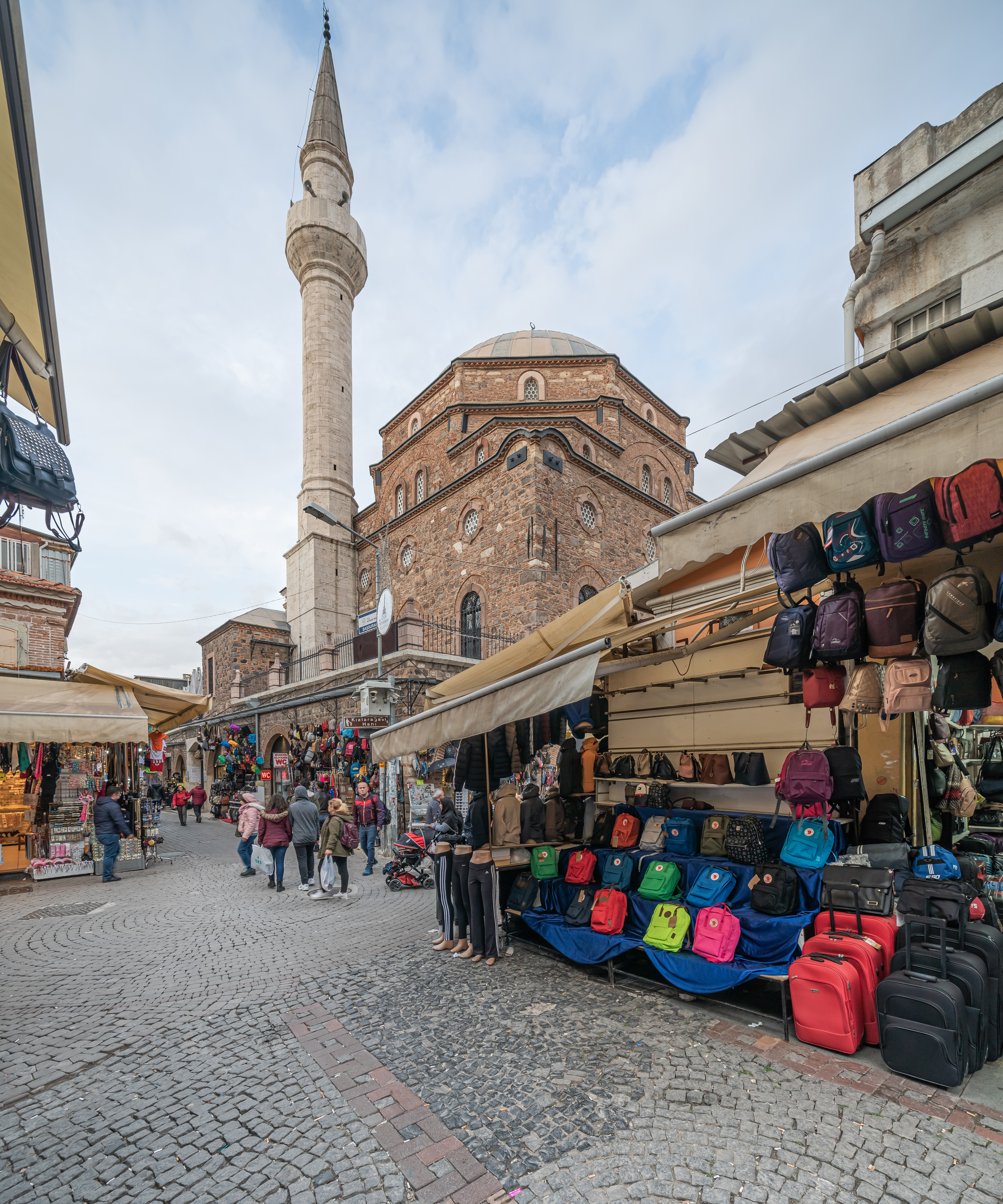
View from the market area
