= Al-Yoosuf Mosque =

Mosque in Eydhafushi, Baa Atoll, Maldives

- Location of the mosque in the Maldives

Religion
- Affiliation: Sunni Islam
- Ecclesiastical or organizational status: Mosque
- Status: Active

Location
- Location: Eydhafushi, Baa Atoll
- Country: Maldives
- Interactive map of Al-Yoosuf Mosque
- Coordinates: 5°06′12.1″N 73°04′20.1″E

Architecture
- Type: Mosque architecture
- Completed: 1970s
- Capacity: 210 worshippers

The Al-Yoosuf Mosque is a Sunni Islam mosque, located in Eydhafushi, on the Baa Atoll, in the Maldives. The mosque opened in the 1970s, and accommodates 210 worshippers. The mosque was named after Yoosuf Kaleyfaanu.

== See also ==
- Islam in the Maldives
- List of mosques in the Maldives
