= Hulhumalé Grand Mosque =

Mosque in Hulhumalé, Kaafu Atoll, Maldives

- Dhivehi: ހުޅުމާލެ ގުއްބު މިސްކިތް
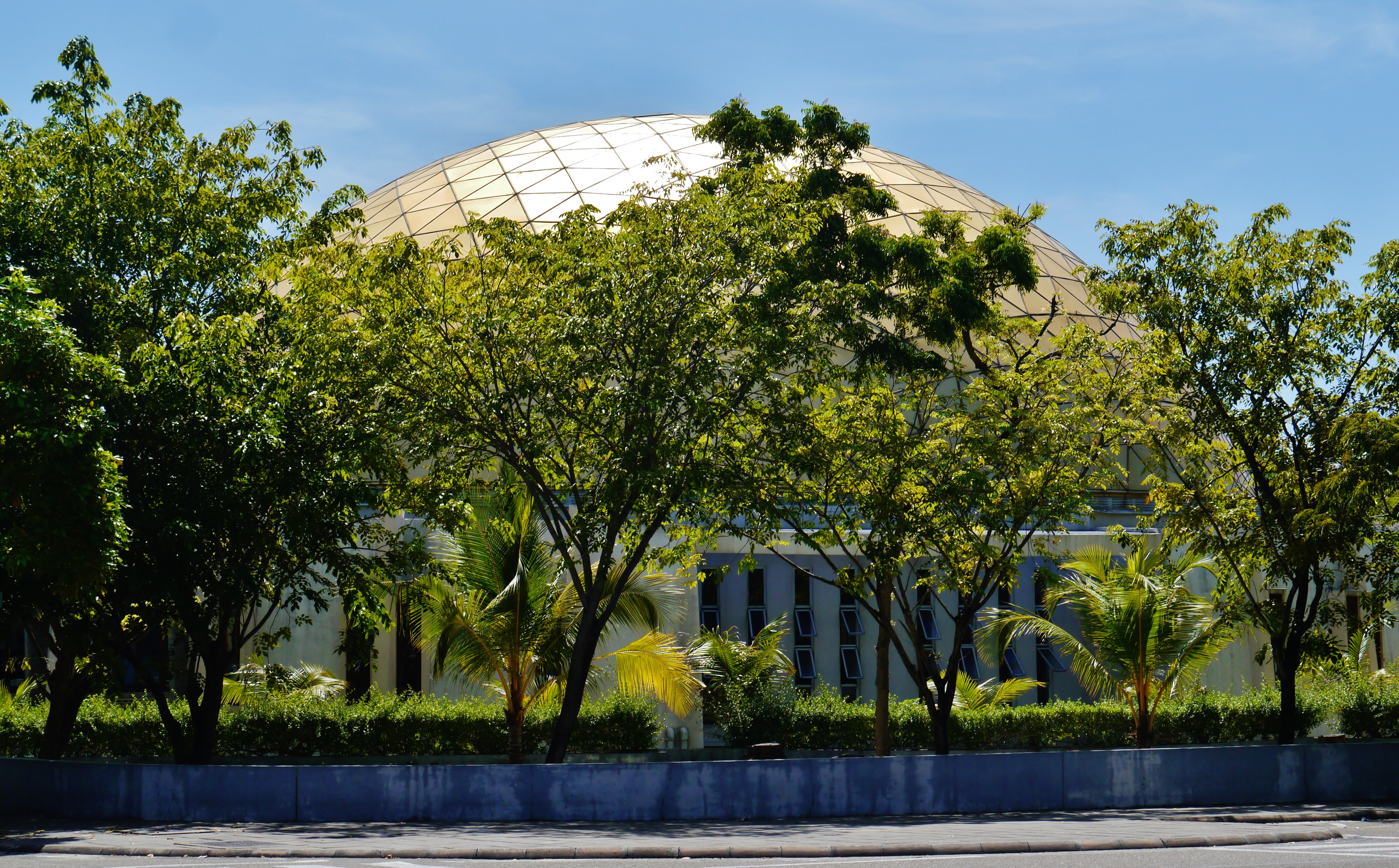
- The mosque in 2018

- Location of the mosque in the Maldives

Religion
- Affiliation: Sunni Islam
- Ecclesiastical or organizational status: Mosque
- Status: Active

Location
- Location: Filigas Magu, Hulhumalé, North Malé Atoll
- Country: Maldives
- Interactive map of Hulhumalé Grand Mosque
- Coordinates: 4°13′05″N 73°32′38″E

Architecture
- Type: Mosque architecture
- Completed: 1998

Specifications
- Capacity: 1,500 worshippers
- Dome: One
- Minaret: One

The Hulhumalé Grand Mosque, formally known as the Masjid al Sheikh Qasim bin Muhammad Al-Thani (Dhivehi: ހުޅުމާލެ ގުއްބު މިސްކިތް; Arabic: مسجد الشيخ قاسم بن محمد آلثاني), is a Sunni Islam mosque, located in Hulhumalé, on the North Malé Atoll, in the Maldives.

The mosque, which accommodates more than 1,500 worshippers, was opened in the early 2000s in the framework of the Hulhumalé land reclamation and development project. It was a gift by the state of Qatar to the Maldives.

A variety of new mosques has been opened ever since. This mosque marks the foundation of beautiful mosques being constructed in Hulhumalé as this is a great and symbolic achievement in mosque construction, not only in Hulhumalé but also in the whole Maldives.

== See also ==
- Islam in the Maldives
- List of mosques in the Maldives
