= Salepçioğlu Mosque =

Mosque in İzmir, Turkey

Coordinates: 38.416944°N 27.1325°E

- Salepçioğlu Camii
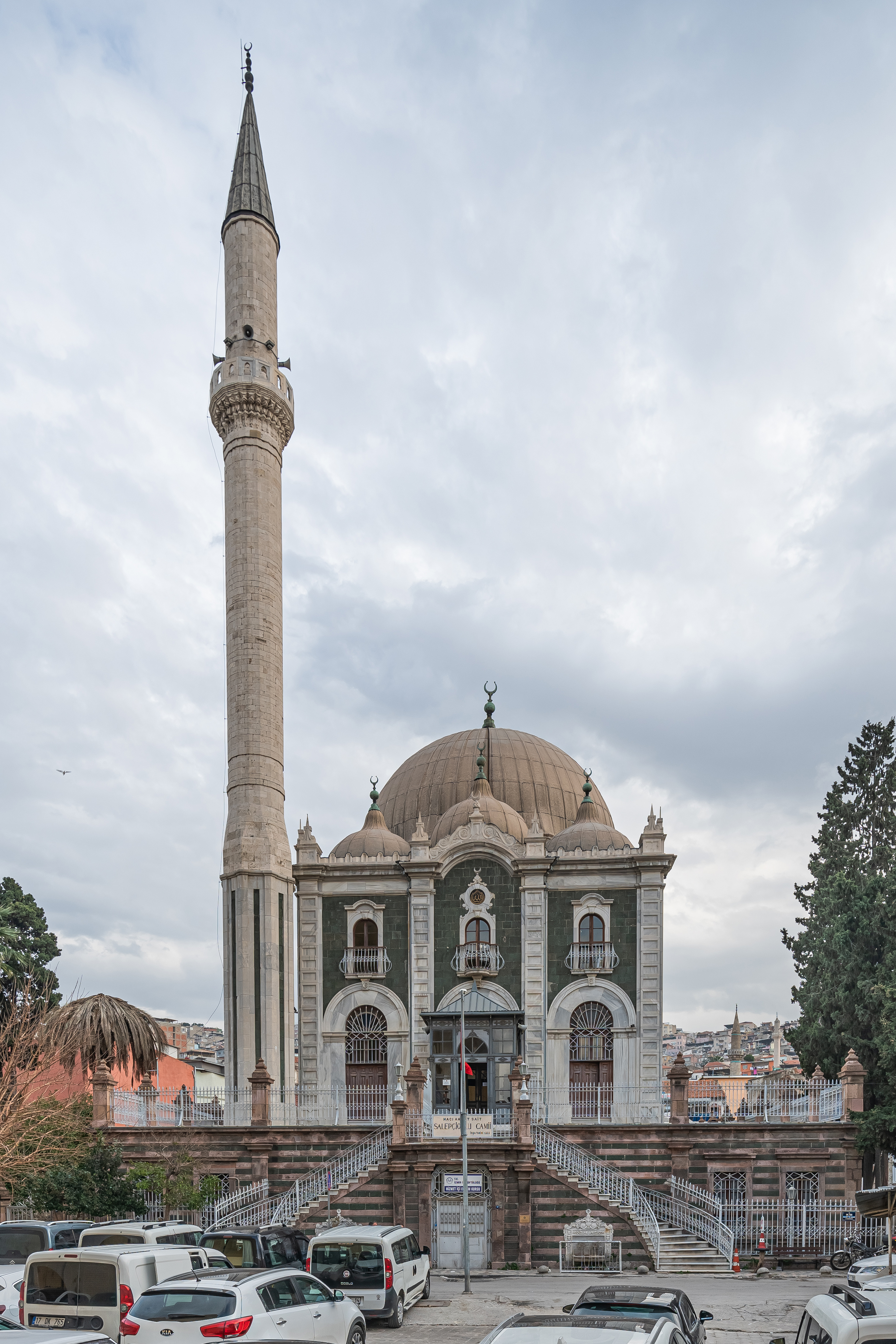

Religion
- Affiliation: Islam

Location
- Location: Konak, İzmir, Turkey

Architecture
- Type: Mosque
- Date established: 1905

Salepçioğlu Mosque (Turkish: Salepçioğlu Camii) is a mosque in İzmir, Turkey, located in Kemeraltı district in the heart of the city. The mosque which was constructed in the year 1905, is named after its patron Salepçizade Hoca Ahmed Efendi.

== Architecture ==
Its outer walls are lined with green marble and stone. In addition to the main dome, there are three smaller domes facing the entrance. Worship has a square space, covered with a dome above pendant. Inside the dome is decorated with carvings. Palette of red, green and brown were to the fore. Round white and gray marble mihrab is a niche. The pulpit is a marble, decorated with geometric motifs above. Inside the mosque is illuminated by the lower and upper two rows of windows.

The minaret of the mosque is not directly connected with the structure in the northeast, on a pedestal of stone, round-bodied and single balcony. The minaret is a very sleek and slim appearance. The minaret was repaired in 1927 and 1974.

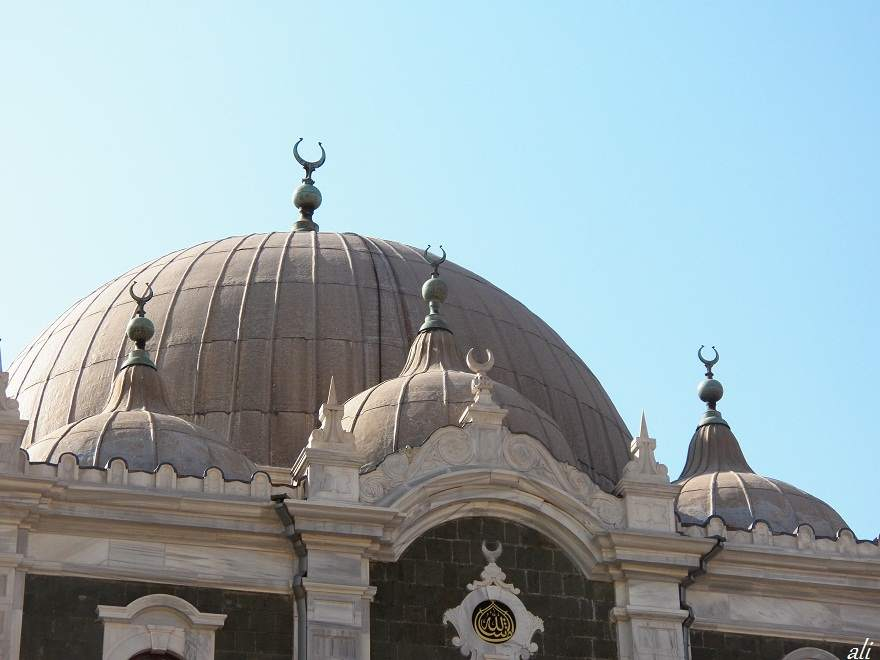
Domes of the Mosque

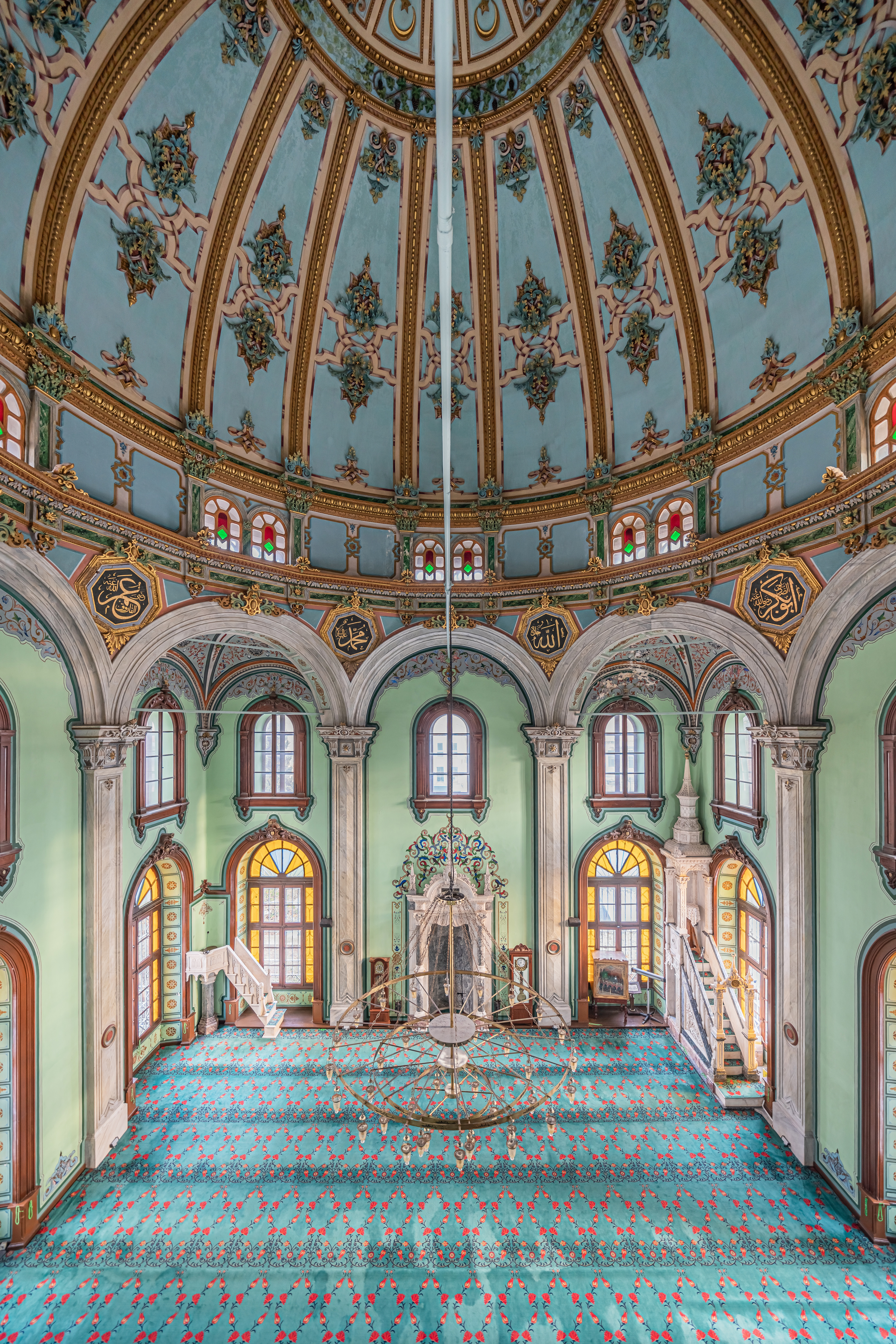
Interior of the mosque

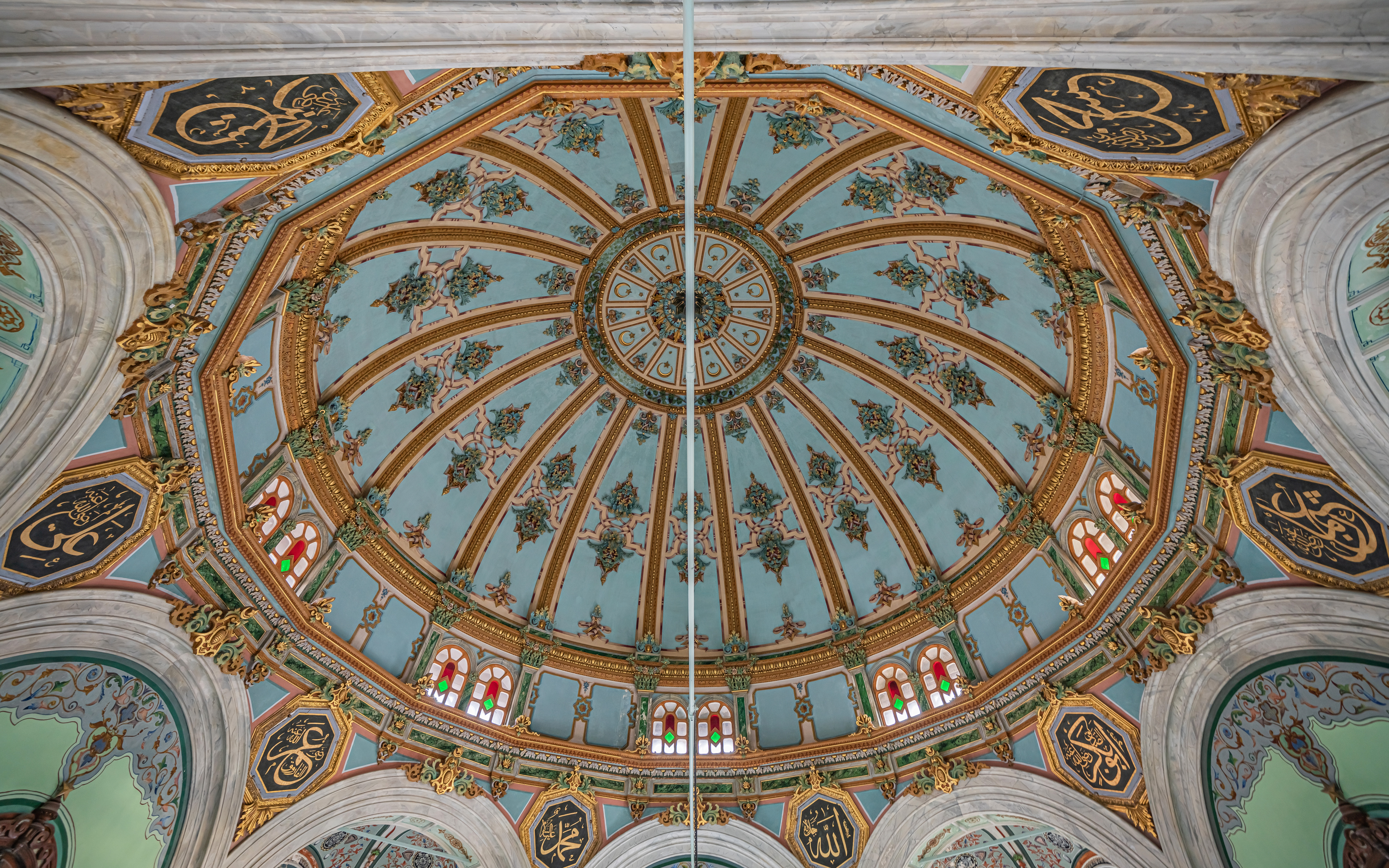
Dome interior
