= Le Juste Milieu Mosque =

Mosque in Luxembourg City, Luxembourg

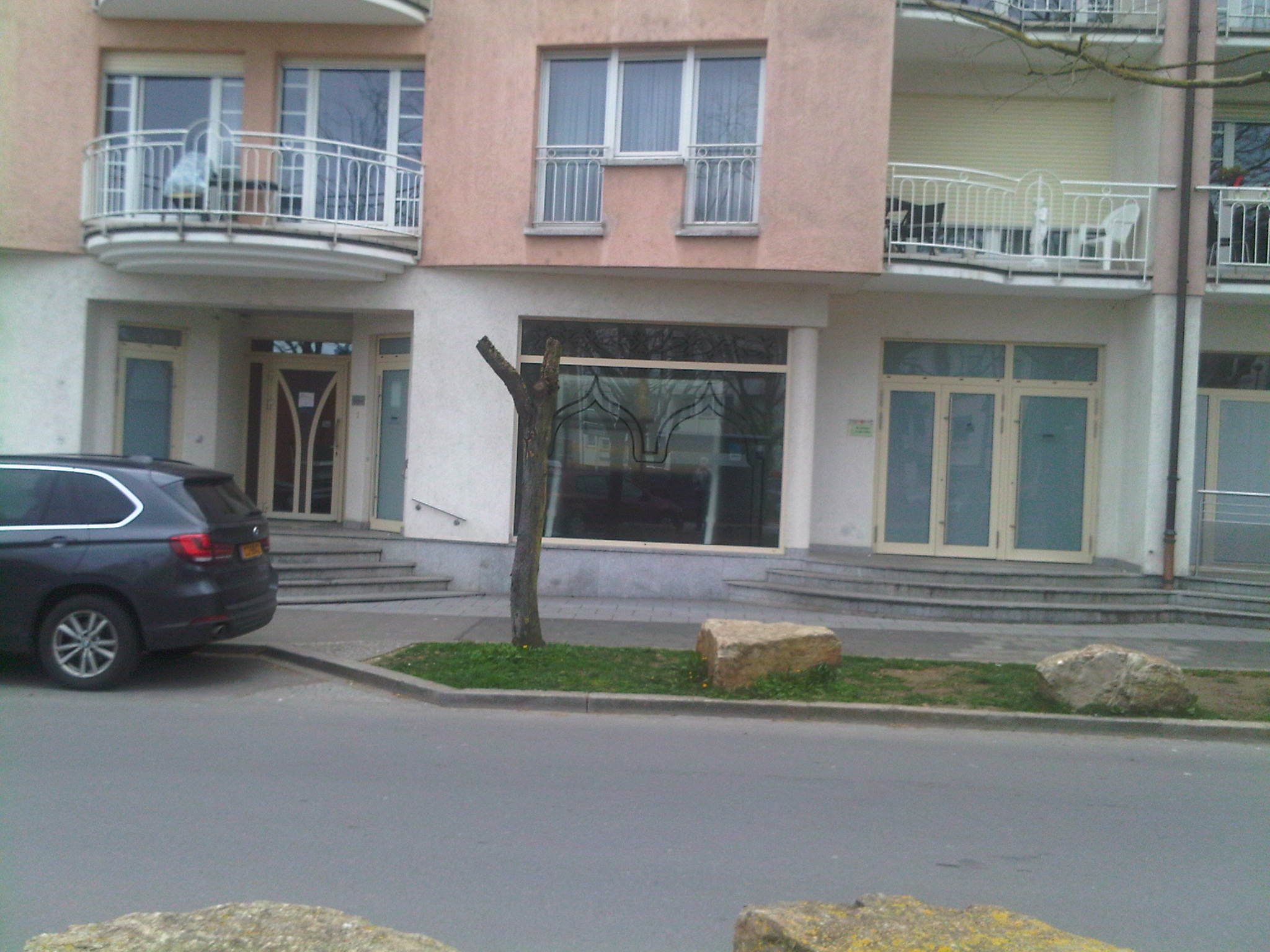

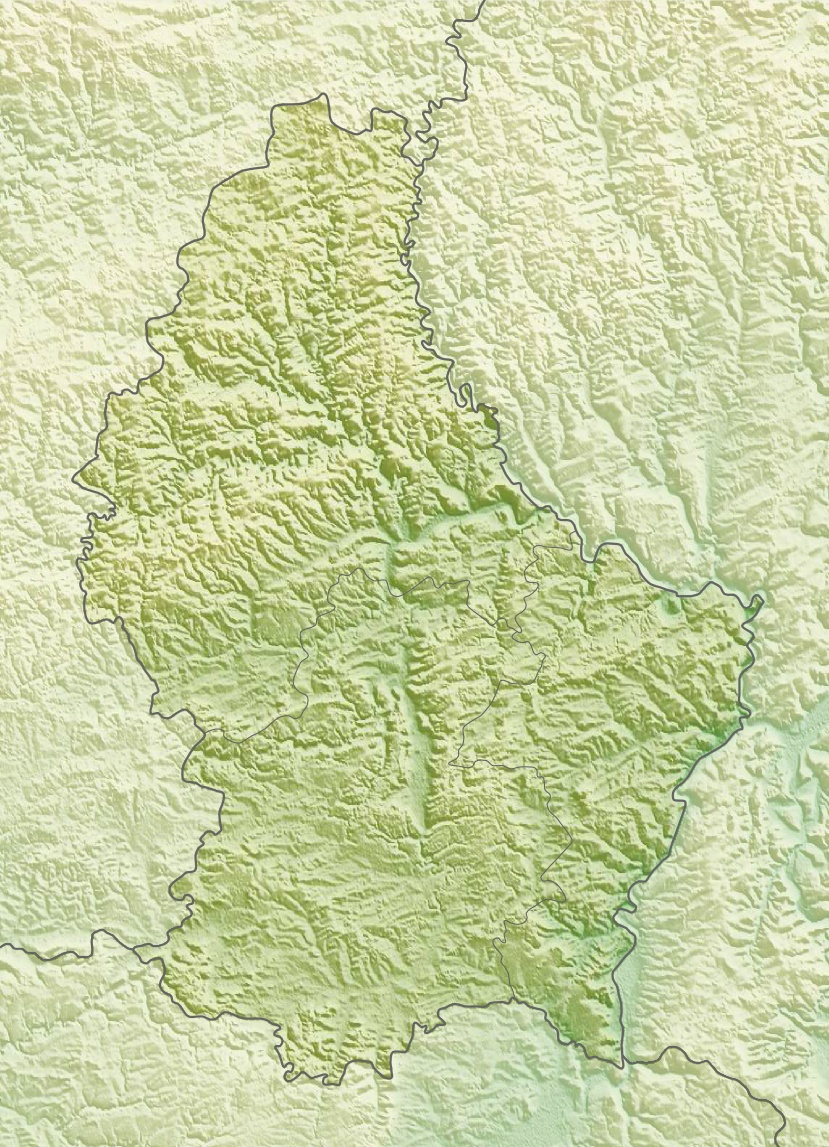
- Location within Luxembourg

Religion
- Affiliation: Islam
- Branch/tradition: Sunni

Location
- Location: Luxembourg City, Luxembourg
- Coordinates: 49°35′48.2″N 6°08′05.7″E

Architecture
- Type: mosque
- Funded by: Qatar Charity
- Established: May 2015

Le Juste Milieu (from Arabic: الوسط, romanized: al-waṣaṭ, "the middle") is the name of an Islamic association and the first Islamic center in Bonnevoie, Luxembourg City. Luxembourg. The center's construction was largely funded by Qatar Charity. Qatar Charity and Le Juste Milieu worked together to found the Islamic center. It was opened in May 2015 by Qatar Charity's chairman, Sheikh Hamad bin Nasser bin Jassim Al Thani.

The overall cost of the project was around 2.2 million euros of which Qatar Charity paid about 75 percent. Le Juste Milieu previously rented the property and had wanted to purchase it due to frequent changes in ownership. Qatar Charity initially began funding the project by selling shares to collect the sufficient funds to cover its construction. They turned to Qatar Charity for help purchasing the property. Qatar Charity initially began funding the project by selling shares to collect the sufficient funds to cover its construction. Despite the assistance from Qatar Charity, the building is owned and operated by Le Juste Milieu.

The cultural center, which has a mosque, legal center, school, da’wah center, and educational center for youth, benefits the more than 3,000 Muslims who live in Luxembourg City. The center covers an area of 650 square meters. Upon its completion its mosque and school were opened to Muslims living in Luxembourg, France, German, Belgium, and the Netherlands.

== Allegations ==
It is accused by some conservative media outlets as a part of Qatari attempts at influencing the Muslim society in Europe through extremist ideology, citing the allegations against Qatar Charity of funding terrorism and extremist activities.
