= Islam in Laos =

Laotian Muslims
Total population
- c. 1,600-50,000 (0.02%)

Regions with significant populations
- Across Laos, particularly in urban areas

Religions
- Predominantly Sunni

Languages
- National language; Lao; Regional and minority languages; Southwestern Mandarin; Cham; South Asian languages; Liturgical language; Arabic

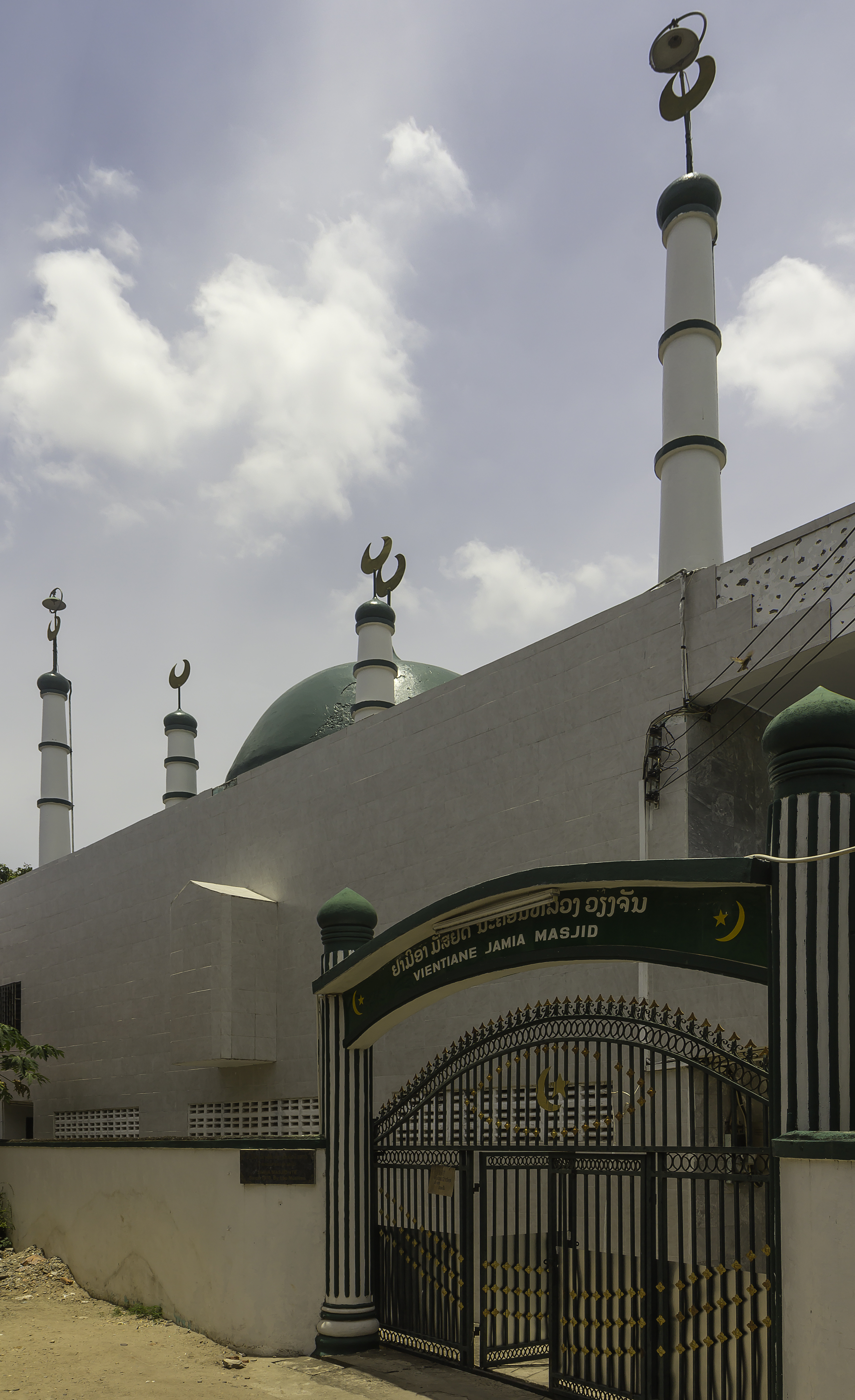
The Vientiane Jamia Mosque

Laos is a Buddhist-majority nation with the officially recognised Muslim population approximately constituting 1% of the total population as of 2008 census. The majority of Laotian Muslims are Sunni. Laotian Muslims can be found in the capital, Vientiane, which has two mosques, as well as other urban areas such as Savannakhet and Oudomxay; the latter of which had a mosque constructed there in June 2016. Laotian Muslims are an ethnically diverse group, mainly consisting of ethnic Lao, Chin Haw, Chams, Tamils, and Pashtuns, with interracial marriages being increasingly popular. They are generally engaged in trade, agriculture, cosmetics, clothing and business (butcher shops and restaurants) though some have attained official roles with the government.

== History ==
The ethnic diversity of Laotian Muslims is associated with the history of how Islam spread into the region. Originally from southern China in places such as Yunnan, a community known as the Chin Haw worked as merchants throughout Myanmar, Thailand, southwest China, and Laos. They were known to have a presence in Laos as far south as Luang Prabang and even beyond, though they mainly reside in northern Laos.

The earliest South Asian Muslims to come to Laos are believed to have been the Tamil Muslims of Pondicherry who arrived to the country via Ho Chi Minh City during the French colonial period. Predominantly belonging to the Labbay community, these Tamils found employment as labourers and guards in the Laotian capital. During World War I, the British Army employed and stationed ethnic Pashtuns to Southeast Asia. South Asian Muslims are mainly found in Vientiane today. The small community of Chams first came to Laos from Cambodia to escape persecution from the Khmer Rouge regime in the late 20th-century. The Chams established the Azahar Mosque, which is popularly known by locals as Masjid Cambodia.

Formerly considered the largest Muslim community in Laos, the Chin Haw community have been sharply declining as many have begun to migrate overseas. Boasting a population of over 7000 in the mid-1960s, the Laotian Civil War and the political developments of the 1970s have driven much of the Chin Haw community to emigrate from Laos. Though majority of the Muslim population trace their origins to other countries, there is a small community of indigenous Lao, who are mostly converts to Islam. Many of these converts intermarry with the other dominant Muslim communities. Nowadays, members of the Tablighi Jamaat frequent Laos from Thailand to spread their teachings.

== Status and representation ==
The Government of Laos officially recognises Islam in its 1991 constitution. The country allows its Muslim citizens to freely practice their religion. The Muslim community has, on a number of occasions, invited administrators from the Lao Front for National Construction and the Vientiane Prefecture to their celebratory festivals. As of 2001, the Lao People's Democratic Republic government began to severely restrict and control the practice of Islam (and other religions) in the country. Laotian Muslims have represented the country in numerous international events such as in Indonesia, at the 2006 Interfaith Conferences on Religion, and in the early 2008 Cambodia conference.

In Vientiane, the Muslim Association is seated in the two-storied Vientiane Jamia Mosque. Its president is Haji Muhammad Rafiq Sofi Sengsone. The mosque has a strong Tamil and Pashtun community and was established in 1970 by Lao Muslims. Maulvi Qamruddin was a notable Tamil imam at the mosque and the mosque has also had a Bangladeshi imam. There is another mosque known as the Azahar Mosque not too far from there which was established by the Cham community in 1986, and became popularly known as Masjid Cambodia (due to their origin). It also hosts a maktab. A Muslim prayer room can also be found in the Wattay International Airport, the country's main international gateway and also located in the capital. In the Luang Prabang Province, there is a mosque, cemetery as well as an Indian halal restaurant called Nisha. Some Laotian Muslims have gone off to study at the International Islamic University Malaysia.

== See also ==
- Islam in Southeast Asia
- Vientiane Jamia Mosque
- Azahar Mosque
