= Daşoguz Mosque =

Mosque in Turkmenistan

Dashoguz Mosque

Religion
- Affiliation: Sunni Islam
- Ecclesiastical or organizational status: Construction Completed
- Status: Active

Location
- Location: Görogly avenue, Daşoguz, Turkmenistan
- Interactive map of Dashoguz Mosque

Architecture
- Architect: 5М Construction (Turkey)
- Type: Mosque
- Style: Islamic architecture
- Groundbreaking: 2013
- Completed: 2015

Specifications
- Capacity: 3,000
- Minaret: 4
- Minaret height: 63
- Materials: Marble

Dashoguz Mosque or Daşoguz metjidi is a mosque in Daşoguz, Turkmenistan, the main mosque of Daşoguz Region. The mosque accommodates up to 3,000 worshipers at a time and is located on Görogly avenue.

== History ==
The foundation-laying ceremony took place in 2013.

It was inaugurated by Gurbanguly Berdimuhamedov, the president of Turkmenistan, on 30 October 2015.

== Architecture ==
The diameter of the mosaic-style central dome of the mosque is 38 meters, the height is 40 meters, and the height of each of the four minarets is 63 meters.

In the mosque, 3 thousand people can pray. A pavilion was built on the territory of the mosque to hold a sadaqa for 1,500 people, as well as a three-story hotel for 200 people.
