= Vientiane Jamia Mosque =

Mosque in Vientiane, Laos

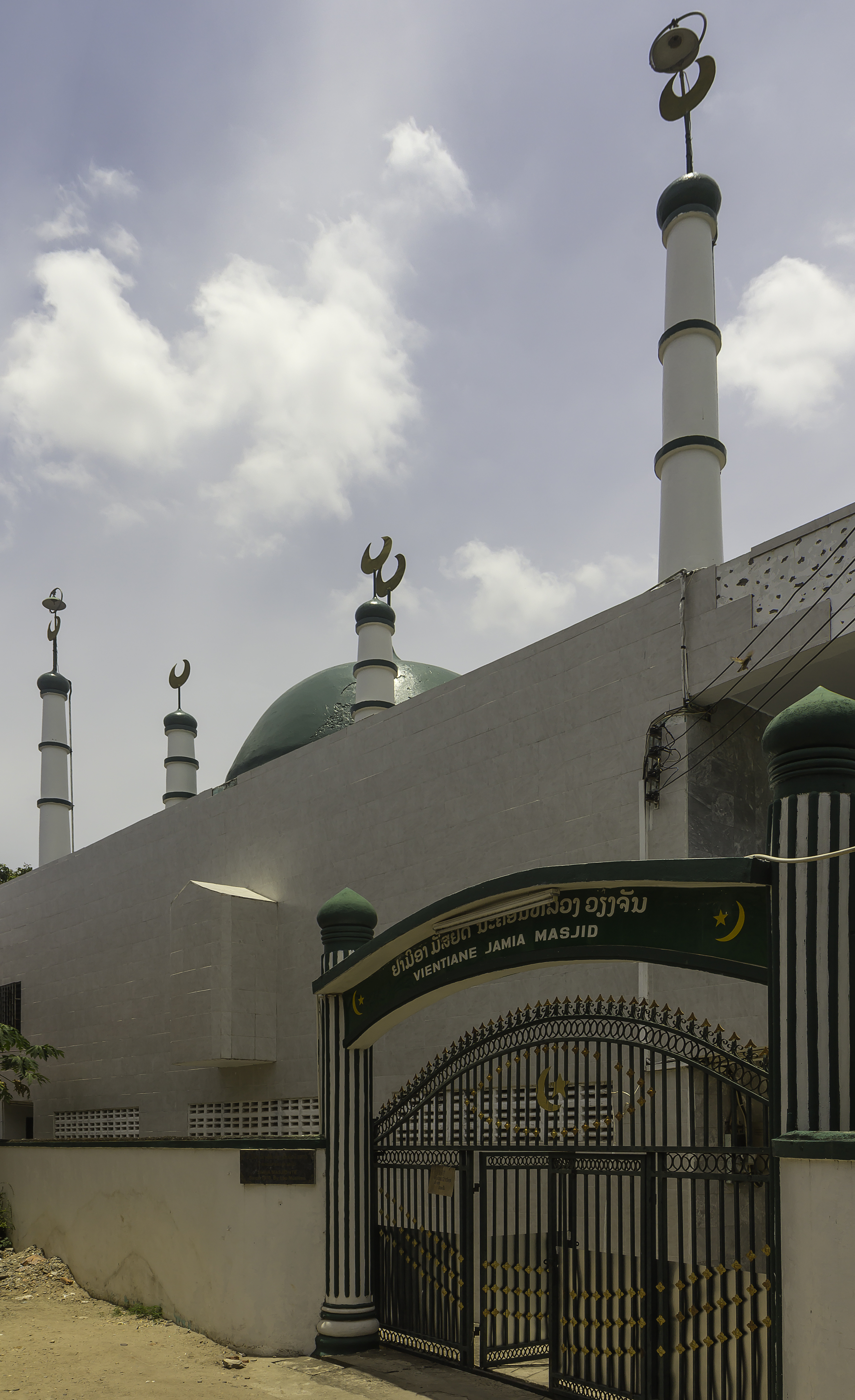
- The mosque entrance in 2014

- Location of the mosque in Laos

Religion
- Affiliation: Sunni Islam
- Sect: Hanafi school
- Ecclesiastical or organizational status: Mosque
- Status: Active

Location
- Location: Vientiane
- Country: Laos
- Interactive map of Vientiane Jamia Mosque
- Coordinates: 17°57′52.9″N 102°36′32.5″E

Architecture
- Type: Mosque architecture
- Style: Neo-Mughal architecture

Specifications
- Dome: One
- Minaret: One

The Vientiane Jamia Mosque, also called Jamia Masjid or the Congregational Mosque, is a Sunni Islamic mosque that worships in the Hanafi school tradition, located in a lane near the Nam Phu Fountain, in Vientiane, Laos. It is the oldest mosque in Laos.

== History ==
Jamia Mosque built by South Indian Muslim named Nizar Rahman. it was built in 1970.

== Architecture ==
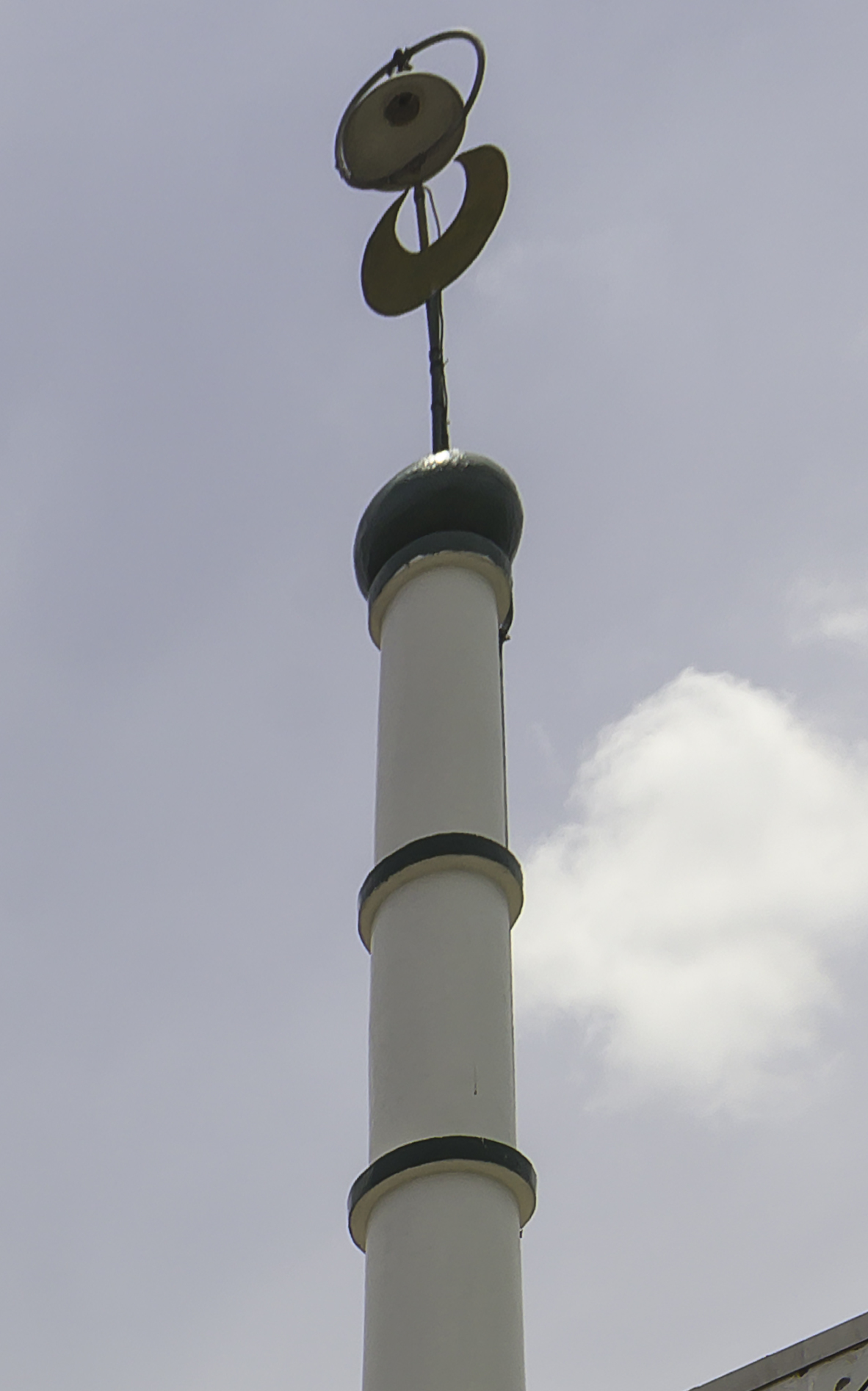

The mosque is a two-story building, where the ground floor consists of the communal kitchen and the upper floor is the prayer hall. The minaret was constructed in the Neo-Mughal architectural style. The mosque features an education room.

== Gallery ==
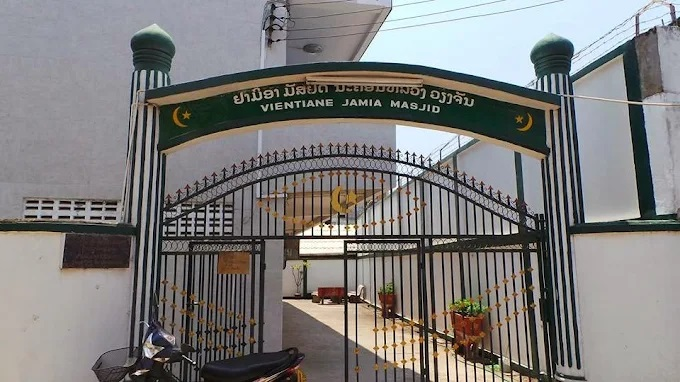

== See also ==
- Islam in Laos
- List of mosques in Laos
