= Hazret Omar Mosque =

Mosque in Turkmenistan

Religion
- Affiliation: Sunni Islam
- Ecclesiastical or organizational status: Construction Completed
- Status: Active

Location
- Location: Parahat-7 microdistrict, Ashgabat, Turkmenistan
- Interactive map of Hazret Omar Mosque

Architecture
- Architect: Aga gurluşyk
- Type: Mosque
- Style: Islamic architecture
- Completed: 2018

Specifications
- Capacity: 3,000
- Minaret: 4
- Minaret height: 63
- Materials: White Marble and granite

Hazret Omar Mosque or Hazret Omar metjidi is a mosque in Ashgabat, Turkmenistan. The mosque accommodates up to 3,000 worshipers at a time and is located on Parahat-7 microdistrict.

== History ==
The mosque was built in accordance with the Decree of President Gurbanguly Berdimuhamedov by order of the religious organization Hoja Ahmet Ýasawy by the construction company Aga Gurluşyk.

The opening ceremony of the mosque was held on September 26, 2018.

== Architecture ==
The total area of the mosque is 13,000 m^{2} (140,000 sq ft). The height of the central dome from the base of the mosque is 40 m (130 ft), small domes 23 m (75 ft). Four minarets in the corners of the building rise 63 m (207 ft) from the foundation.

Marble, granite, valuable wood species were used in the decoration of interior. Embossed epigraphy containing Surahs of the Qur'an occupies a separate place in the decoration of the mosque. They also adorn its white marble facades.

The prayer hall is designed for the simultaneous participation in the prayer of 3000 people. The upper tier is for women.

On the territory of the mosque there is a special building for holding sadaqah, ritual ceremonies and parking.
