= Al-Furqan Mosque =

Mosque in Glasgow, Scotland, United Kingdom

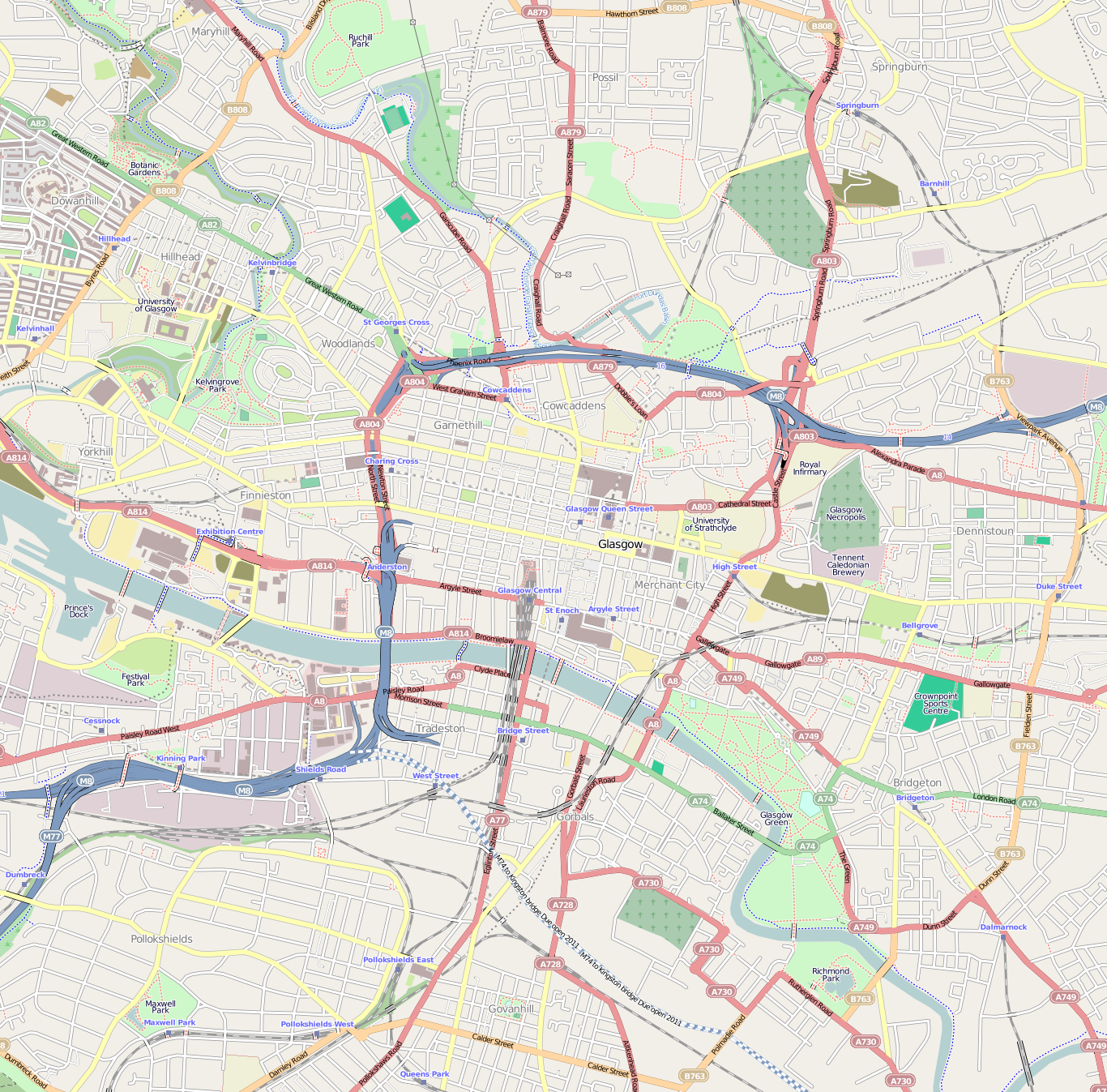
- Location within Central Glasgow

Religion
- Affiliation: Islam

Location
- Location: Glasgow, Scotland, UK
- Interactive map of Al-Furqan Mosque
- Coordinates: 55°52′17.8″N 4°16′17.6″W

Architecture
- Type: mosque
- Completed: 1992
- Capacity: 500 worshipers

Website
- https://alfurqanmosque.com

Al-Furqan Mosque is located in the Woodside district of central Glasgow.

== The Mosque ==
The foundations were laid in 1984 by the Glasgow branch of UK Islamic Mission. It is the second purpose-built mosque in Glasgow. The building can accommodate 500 worshipers.
