= Lebap Region Mosque =

Mosque in Turkmenistan

Religion
- Affiliation: Sunni Islam
- Region: Lebap Region
- Ecclesiastical or organisational status: Construction Completed
- Status: Active

Location
- Location: Bitarap Turkmenistan street, Türkmenabat, Turkmenistan

Architecture
- Type: Mosque
- Style: Islamic architecture
- Groundbreaking: 2015
- Completed: 2020

Specifications
- Capacity: 3,000
- Minaret: 4
- Minaret height: 63
- Materials: Marble

Lebap Region Mosque or Lebap welaýatynyň baş metji is a mosque in Türkmenabat, Turkmenistan, the main mosque of Lebap Region. The mosque accommodates up to 3,000 worshipers at a time and is located on Bitarap Turkmenistan street.

== History ==
The foundation-laying ceremony took place in June 2015.

It was inaugurated by Gurbanguly Berdimuhamedov, the president of Turkmenistan, on 21 February 2020.

== Architecture ==
The total area of the mosque is 5 hectares (12 acres), and in its two-story building 3000 people can perform a prayer service. The height of each of the four minarets is 63 m (207 ft), and the height of the dome is 40 m (130 ft). There is also a room for a sadaka for 500 people, a hotel for 50 people and a parking.

The central dome of the mosque is crowned with a golden crescent. The architectural complex also includes four slender minarets decorated with original decor elements. The area of the first tier is 3,444 m^{2} (37,070 sq ft), the second tier intended for women is 1,609 m^{2} (17,320 sq ft).
