= Chanthabuly district =

Chanthabuly district ຈັນທະບູລີ Chanthabuly
- Town
- Location in Laos
- Coordinates: 17°58′41″N 102°36′56″E
- Country: Laos
- Province: Vientiane Prefecture
- District: Chanthabuly

Population (2020)
  - Total: 77,255
- Time zone: UTC+7 (ICT)

Chanthabuly is a district of Vientiane Prefecture, Laos.

As of 2020, the population was 77,255

== Village ==
Chanthabuly has 37 villages as follows

- Ban Nong Bueng
- Ban Bonawua
- Ban Huai Hong
- Ban Phon Sawang
- Ban Nong Ta Nuea
- Ban Nong Ta Tai
- Ban Don Daeng
- Ban Phon Tong Sawak
- Ban Dong Pla Haep
- Ban Phon Tong Chom Mani
- Ban Rong Daeng
- Ban Rong Kai
- Ban Sawang
- Ban Thung Sang Nang
- Ban Rong Kha Nuea
- Ban Thung Tun
- Ban Dong Miang
- Ban Sri Khamdon
- Ban Sri Boonruean
- Ban Rong Kha Tai
- Ban Khua Luang Nuea
- Ban Sri Sawat Nuea
- Ban Sri Sawat Klang
- Ban Sri Sawat Tai
- Ban Thung Khan Kham Nuea
- Ban Thung Khan Kham Tai
- Ban Khua Luang Tai
- Ban Sri Hom
- Ban Anu
- Ban Sailom
- Ban Hatsadi Nuea
- Ban Hatsadi Tai
- Ban Chiang Yuen
- Ban Hai Sok
- Ban Wat Chan
- Ban Mi Chai
- Ban Chiang Yim
