= Worcester Mosque =

Mosque in Worcester, Massachusetts, United States

Worcester Islamic Center

Religion
- Affiliation: Islam

Location
- Location: 248 East Mountain Street; Worcester, Massachusetts
- Country: United States
- Interactive map of Worcester Islamic Center
- Coordinates: 42.3154°N 71.7738°W

Architecture
- Established: 2005

Website
- www.wicmasjid.org

The Worcester Islamic Center (WIC), or the Worcester Mosque, is a mosque located in Worcester, Massachusetts. The center started its operations in Oct 2005 (Ramadan 1426). There is also a madrasa housed in the same building on the first floor. The website for the school is Alhuda Academy.

The center was built to replace the earlier mosque in the city, officially called ISGW (Islamic Society of Greater Worcester). The ISGW building was not adequate for the size of the congregation during the Friday and Eid prayers.

== Leadership ==
- 1998-2007: Imam Hamid Mahmood
- 2007–2018: Imam Abdulkarim Hassan
- 2018–2025: Imam Dr. Asif Hirani
- 2025–present: Imam Shaykh Wajid Pathan

Imam Hamid Mahmood (1998-2007)
From 1998 to 2007, Hamid Mahmood served as the mosque's imam. Imam Mahmood earned an undergraduate degree in Arabic and Islamic Studies from the University of the Punjab. During his tenure, the members of the mosque community began to engage in interfaith activity in the area, and the imam initiated frequent visits to the mosque by other area religious communities. Mahmood resigned from the mosque when visa complications required him and his family to return to Pakistan.

== See also ==
- List of mosques in the Americas
- Lists of mosques
- List of mosques in the United States
