= Islamic Foundation North =

Mosque in Waukegan, IL, United States

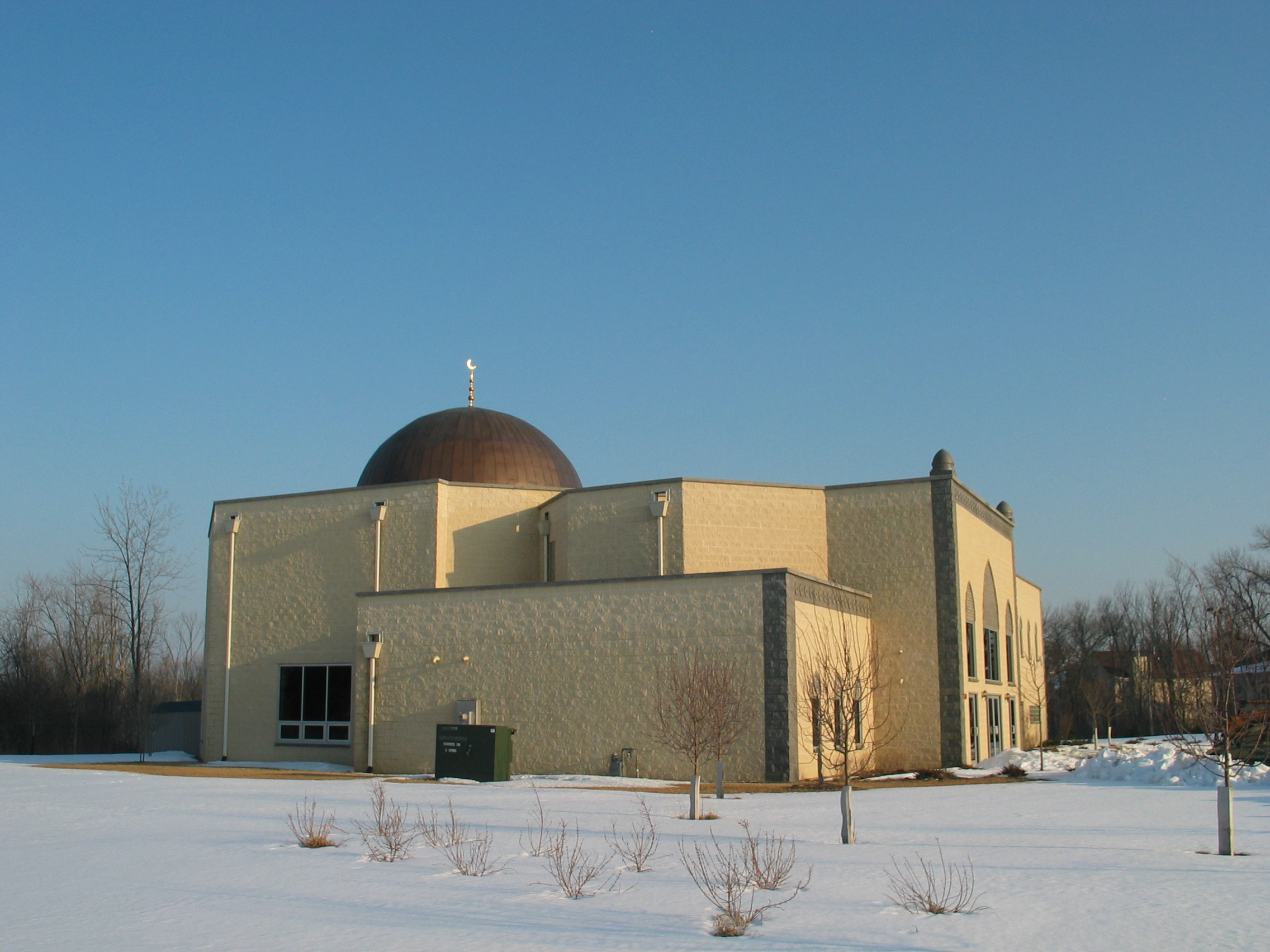

- Location in Illinois

Religion
- Affiliation: Islam
- Ecclesiastical or organizational status: Mosque
- Leadership: Shaykh Azfar Uddin (imam); Jaseem Anwer (President)
- Status: Active

Location
- Location: 1751 O'Plaine Rd, Waukegan, Libertyville Lake County, Illinois 60048
- Country: United States
- Interactive map of Islamic Foundation North
- Coordinates: 42°19′41″N 87°54′47″W

Architecture
- Established: 1977 (as a community)
- Completed: 2004 (current building)
- Dome: 1

Website
- ifnonline.com

The Islamic Foundation North is a mosque located in Waukegan, Libertyville Lake County, in the state of Illinois, in the United States. Its current building was built in 2004.

The organization was established in 1977 to serve the needs of the Muslim community of Chicago's northern suburbs. The current structure was completed in 2004. The imam and resident scholar of the mosque is Azfar Uddin.

The mosque is not affiliated with the Islamic Foundation in Villa Park.

== See also ==
- Islam in the United States
- List of mosques in the United States
