= North Penn Mosque =

Mosque in Lansdale, Pennsylvania, United States

Religion
- Affiliation: Islam
- Leadership: Syed Afzal (president)

Location
- Location: 600 Maple Avenue Lansdale, Montgomery County, Pennsylvania, United States
- Interactive map of North Penn Mosque
- Coordinates: 40.24764°N 75.28360°W

Architecture
- Type: mosque
- Established: 2000

Website
- northpennmosque.org

North Penn Mosque is a mosque in Lansdale, Montgomery County, Pennsylvania. In addition to daily prayers, the mosque arranges education programs, social activities, interfaith dialogues, and peace efforts in the community.

== History ==
North Penn Mosque was established in 2000 when local Muslims realized they needed a place to congregate and pray together. The site of the mosque sits on the former Saint Marie Club.

After a zoning hearing on February 18, 2014, the mosque received permission to convert a nearby building they had bought into an education center. It was intended for after-school religious educational classes, as well as private apartments for religious instructors capable of housing two families, and money was raised with fundraisers.

On April 4, 2021, 650 people were vaccinated at the mosque which was used as a COVID-19 vaccination clinic.

== See also ==
- List of mosques in the United States
