= Baitul Hameed Mosque =

Mosque in California, the United States

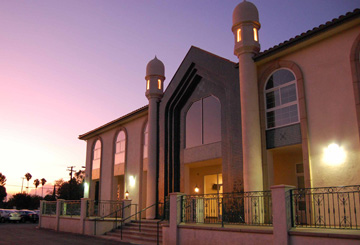

- Location in California

Religion
- Affiliation: Islam
- Branch/tradition: Ahmadiyya
- Ecclesiastical or organisational status: non-profit religious organization

Location
- Location: 11941 Ramona Ave., Chino, CA 91710 USA
- Coordinates: 34.036636°N 117.705765°W

Architecture
- Type: Mosque
- Style: Spanish Islamic
- Established: 1989; Renovated: 2009
- Construction cost: $2.5 million (initial) + $5 million (reconstruction & expansion)

Specifications
- Capacity: 1,500
- Dome: 0
- Minaret: 2

Website
- www.muslimsforpeace.org

The Baitul Hameed Mosque (English: House of the Praiseworthy) is the largest Ahmadiyya Muslim mosque in the Western United States with an area of 19,000 square feet (1,800 m^{2}) sitting on nearly 5 acres (20,000 m^{2}). Initially built in 1989 at a cost of $2.5 million, entirely from donations of the Ahmadiyya Muslim Community, it is located east of Los Angeles in Chino, California, just inside San Bernardino County. The San Gabriel Mountains provide a beautiful backdrop to this Spanish-inspired mosque with modern amenities. In 2003, an electrical fire caused heavy damage to the front building which was used for library and office space, as well as a kitchen. The affected areas were demolished, and rebuilt with a second story. In addition, a separate auxiliary hall was built adjacent to the existing Tahir Hall, for the exclusive use of Lajna Imaillah. The reconstructed mosque opened again for full use in August, 2009. A separate commercial kitchen and missionary residence/guest house are also on site. Plans are now underway for the construction of an NCAA sized basketball court with space allocated in the back lot.

== Inauguration ==
The foundation stone was placed by Mirza Tahir Ahmad in October, 1987 and inaugurated by him in July, 1989. The mosque was one of five build as a direct result of the "5 Mosque Initiative" where Mirza Tahir Ahmad directed the Ahmadiyya Muslim Community of the United States to establish 5 mosques throughout the country.

== Community outreach programs ==
Several events are held at the Baitul Hameed Mosque to serve both the Muslim and greater community, in addition to daily congregational prayer services. Food drives, blood collection drives, and peace symposium are conducted several times a year. The mosque is open daily to the public and guided tours are available.

== Facilities ==
- Prayer halls for Men and Women
- Offices
- Library
- 2 Exhibition Halls
- Multi-functional rooms / classrooms
- Commercial Kitchen & Kitchenette
- Regulation Basketball Court (High School)
- Missionary living quarters and guest house
- Disabled access

== See also ==
- Ahmadiyya Muslim Community
- Islam in the United States
- Islamic architecture
- Islamic art
- List of mosques in the Americas
- Lists of mosques
- List of mosques in the United States
