= Islamic Center of Central Missouri =

Mosque in Columbia, Missouri

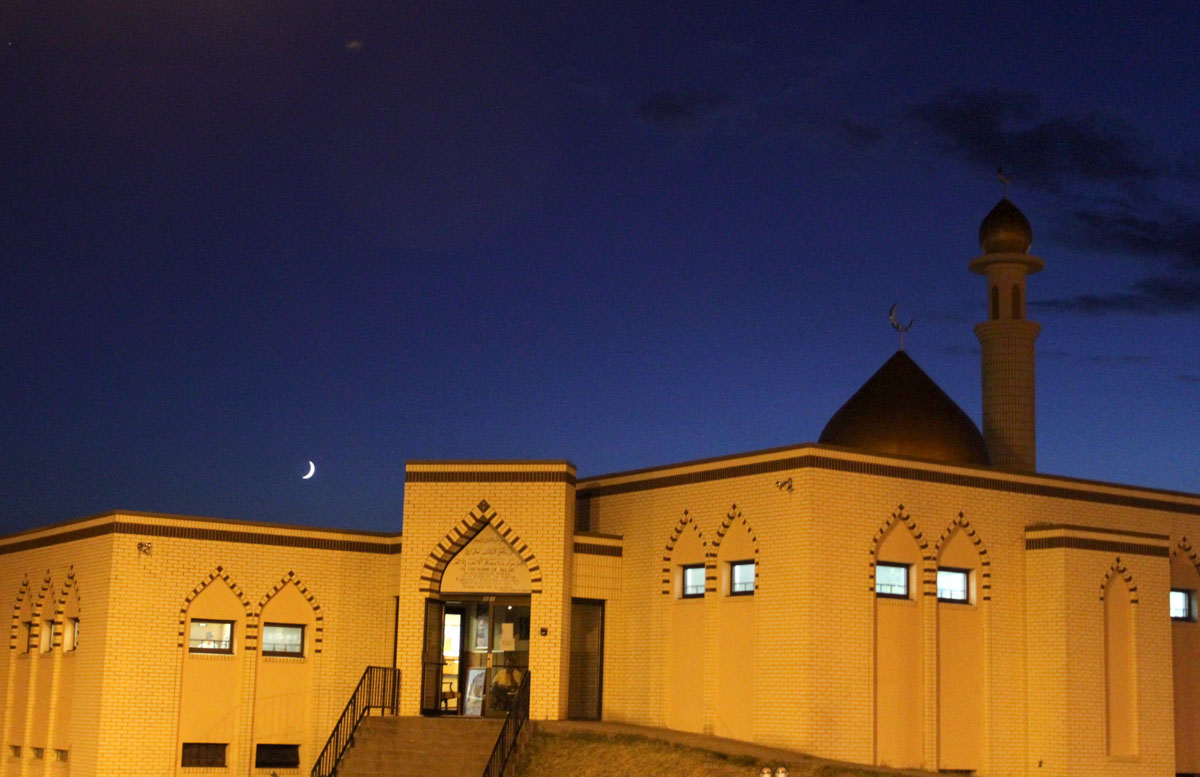

- Location in Missouri

Religion
- Affiliation: Islam
- Ecclesiastical or organizational status: non-profit religious organization
- Leadership: President: Fu'ad Khaleel

Location
- Location: 201 S. Fifth St., Columbia, Missouri 65201
- Interactive map of Islamic Center of Central Missouri
- Coordinates: 38.9493°N 92.3321°W

Architecture
- Type: Mosque
- Established: 1983

Specifications
- Dome: 1
- Minaret: 1

Website
- Official Website

Islamic Center of Central Missouri is a mosque located in Columbia, Missouri. Established in 1983, it is the first Islamic center in the state of Missouri.

== Events ==
=== Friday Sermons ===
Friday sermons,(khuṭbah) (lit. narration) are held every week from 12 to 12:45pm and 1-2pm. Khatib at this Islamic Center is usually a member of the local Muslim community. Sometimes national Muslim speakers are also invited. Prominent khateebs who have spoken at the Islamic Center include Suhaib Webb.

=== Open House ===
Every Spring, the mosque holds an open house where followers of other faiths are invited to visit the center, learn more about Islam and ask questions about the faith and its tenets. Free mediterranean food, appetizers, dessert and refreshments are provided to visitors. Visitors can also pick up free reading material on Islam and the Muslim faith.

=== Eid Prayers ===
Eid ul-Fitr and Eid al-Adha prayer ceremonies are held every year. The Eid-Al-Adha prayers in November 2010 were attended by about 750 Muslims from the Columbia area.

== See also ==
- List of mosques in the Americas
- Lists of mosques
- List of mosques in the United States
