= Islamic Center of Irvine =

Mosque in Irvine, California, United States

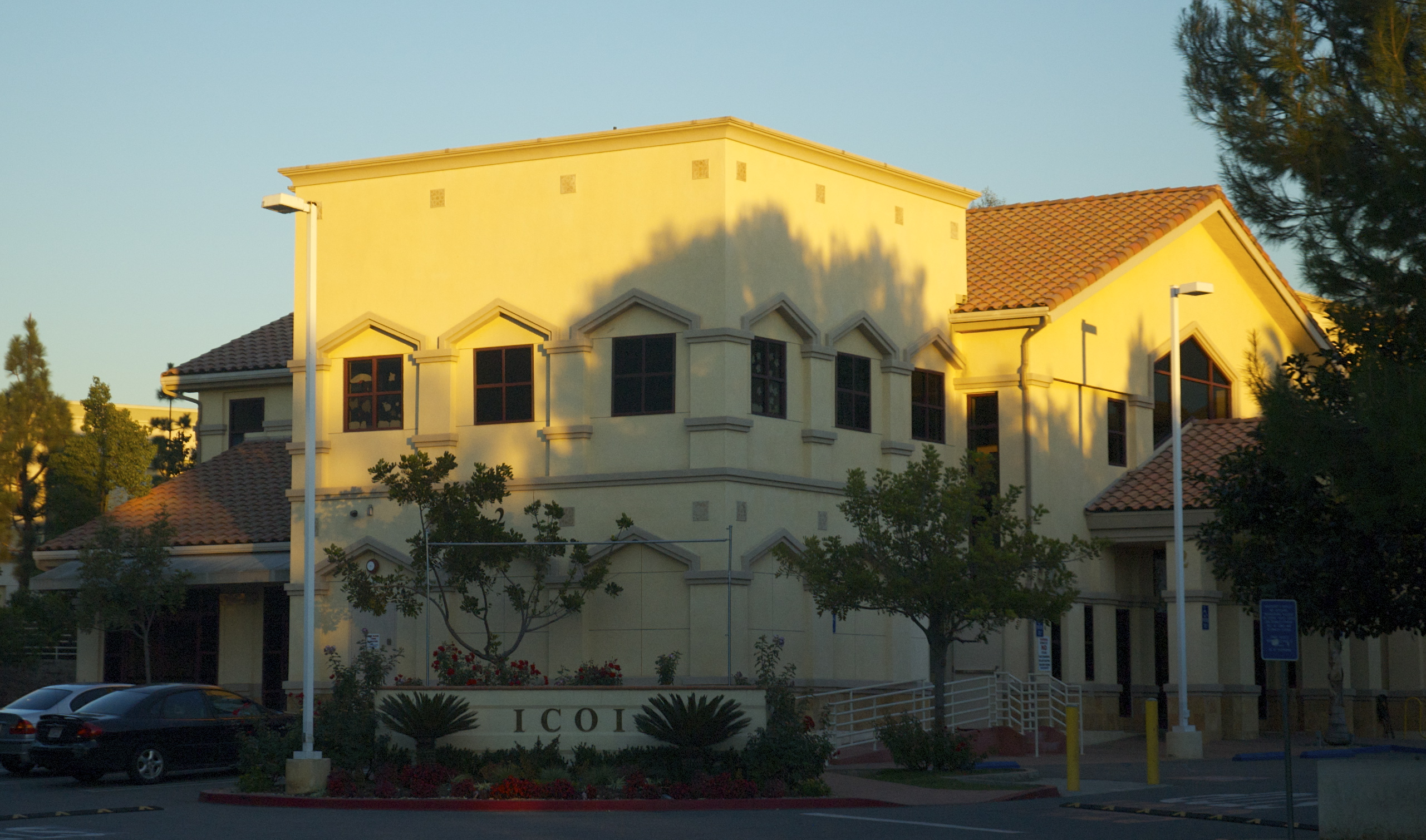

- Location in California

Religion
- Affiliation: Islam
- Ecclesiastical or organizational status: Non-profit religious organization

Location
- Location: 2 Truman St, Irvine, CA 92620
- Interactive map of Islamic Center of Irvine
- Coordinates: 33.696526°N 117.765513°W

Architecture
- Type: Mosque
- Established: 2004

Specifications
- Dome: 0
- Minaret: 0

Website
- Official Website

The Islamic Center of Irvine is a mosque and Islamic community center founded by the Muslims of Irvine, California, on August 28, 2004.

The mosque has one of the largest congregations in California, with an estimated 2,500 worshipers attending weekly programs and benefiting from a variety of services, including youth programs, an annual summer camp for children, senior workshops and interfaith sports.

The Islamic Center of Irvine is partnered with the Islamic Society of Orange County in nearby Garden Grove, the Orange County Islamic Foundation in Mission Viejo and the Islamic Institute of Orange County in Anaheim. It is teamed with various churches and signed a friendship pact at an event with Saddleback Church, one of the largest in the country.

== FBI spying ==
A convicted con man, Craig Monteilh of Tustin, accused the FBI of running him as a paid informant in the center from July 2006 to October 2007, and then reneging on its deal with him. He was instructed to pose as a convert to Islam in order to collect information on attendees of the mosque, secretly recording conversations and daily activity through hidden devices disguised as everyday items such as car keys. His actions made the members of the Muslim community very uncomfortable. A restraining order was later taken out against him.

Three center members filed suit against the FBI and the United States in 2011 for violating several of their rights related to electronic surveillance during Monteilh's time as an informant. The case was initially dismissed by the United States District Court for the Central District of California in August 2012 after the FBI asserted state secrets privilege. The Ninth Circuit reversed this ruling in part, stating that under Foreign Intelligence Surveillance Act, the plaintiffs' had a right to seek legal action against the FBI which overrode their use of their state secrets privilege. The FBI appealed this ruling to the Supreme Court of the United States, which heard the case during the 2021–22 term. The Supreme Court ruled on March 4, 2022 that the FISA section cited did not overrule state secrets privilege, reversing the Ninth Circuit.

== See also ==
- List of mosques in the Americas
- Lists of mosques
- List of mosques in the United States
