= Islamic Center and Mosque of Grand Rapids =

Coordinates: 42.92743°N 85.63616°W

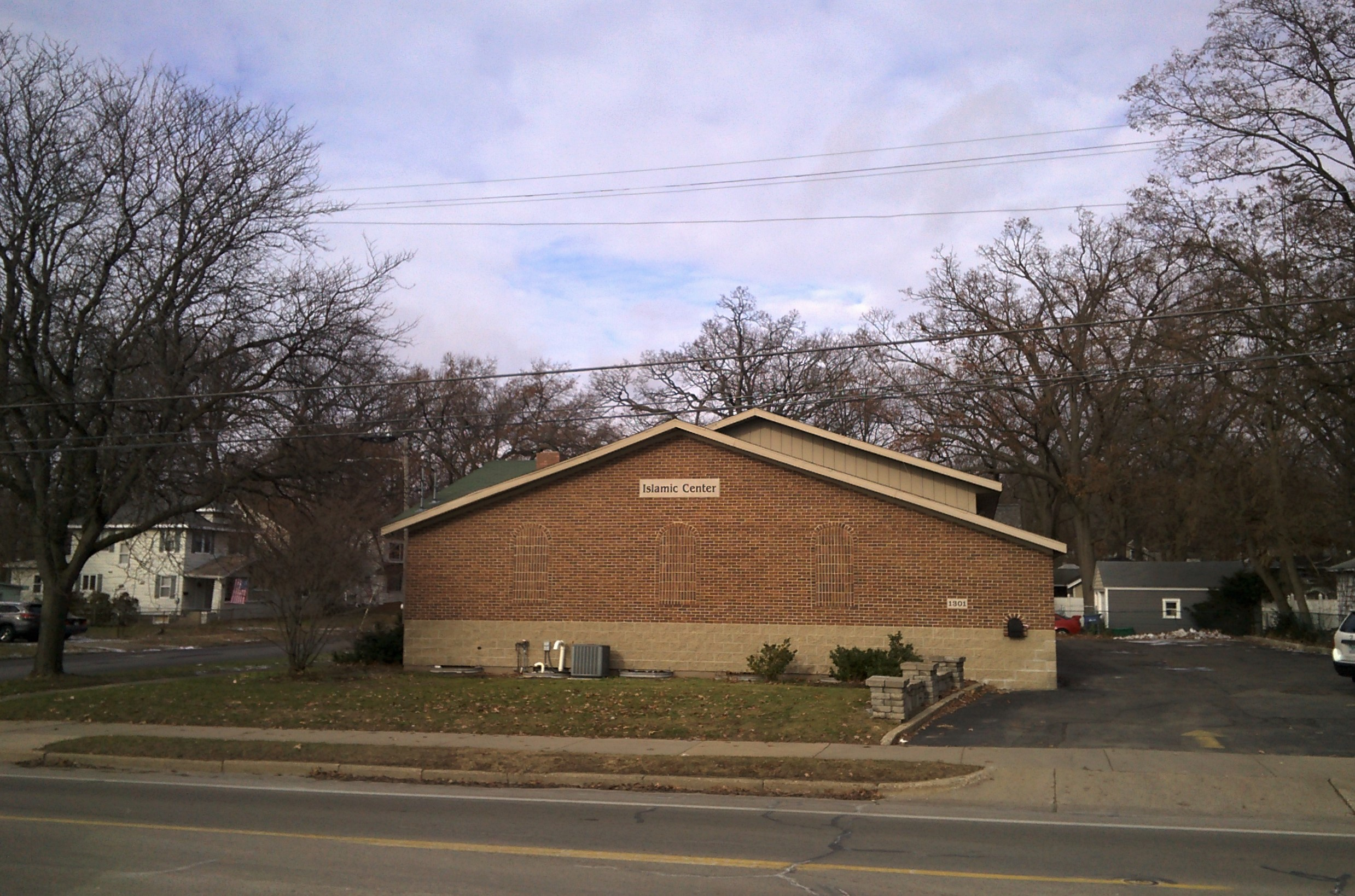
Islamic Center and Mosque of Grand Rapids

The Islamic Center and Mosque of Grand Rapids is a mosque and Islamic Center located in Grand Rapids, Michigan, United States, near Burton St and Kalamazoo Ave. It opened in 1986. on the 12th of "Rabi-ul Awal" (celebrated as the birthday of Muhammad). The building was previously a church for Jehovah's Witnesses.

The center is Sufi and Pakistani.

== See also ==
- List of mosques in the Americas
- Lists of mosques
- List of mosques in the United States
