= Islamic Society of Greater Dayton =

Islamic organization based in Dayton, Ohio, United States

Religion
- Affiliation: Islam
- Branch/tradition: Sunni

Location
- Location: Dayton, Ohio
- Interactive map of Islamic Society of Greater Dayton
- Coordinates: 39.755583°N 84.175833°W

Architecture
- Type: Mosque
- Style: Post-War Modern
- Established: 1985

Website
- www.isgd.org

The Islamic Society of Greater Dayton (ISGD) is a Sunni Muslim community organization based in Dayton, Ohio. The organization includes a mosque on Josie Street. Regular activities at the mosque include worship services, outreach, language classes, and religious classes.

In September 2008, two attackers reportedly sprayed a chemical agent into the windows of the Josie Street mosque during a Ramadan worship service. Worshipers left in discomfort. The incident was investigated as a possible hate crime. The attack followed the distribution of Obsession, an anti-Islamic movie, in the Dayton region.

The ISGD owns and maintains land that is used as a traditional Islamic cemetery.

The ISGD is planning on moving to new facilities in Sugarcreek Township outside Dayton. The township approved the plans in 2008. Construction on the mosque is continuing as of April 2014.

== See also ==
- List of mosques in the Americas
- Lists of mosques
- List of mosques in the United States
