= Muslim Community Center =

Mosque in Chicago, Illinois

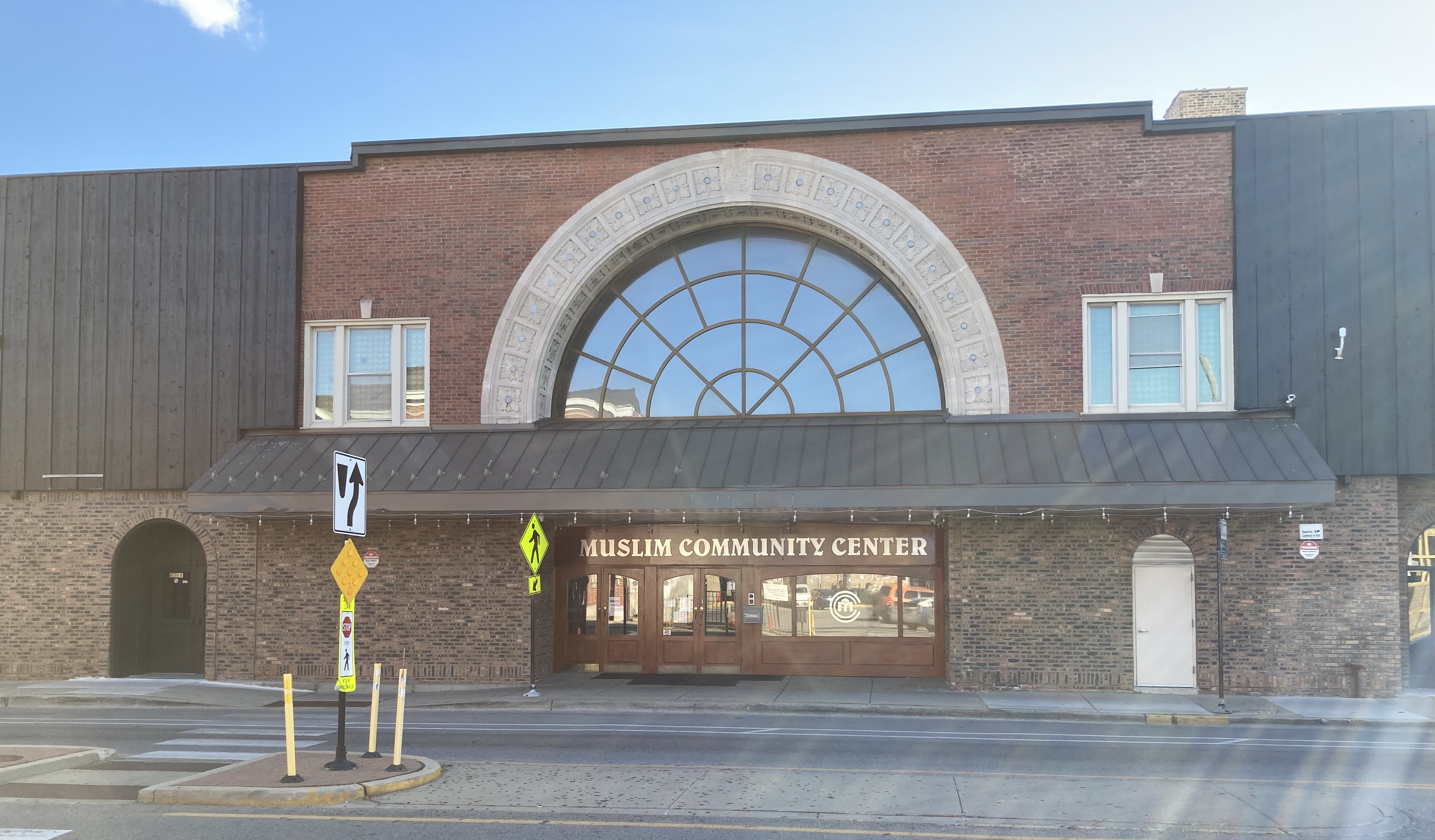

Religion
- Affiliation: Islam

Location
- Location: Chicago, Illinois, United States
- Interactive map of Muslim Community Center
- Coordinates: 41.960164°N 87.729012°W

Architecture
- Type: Mosque
- Completed: 1969; 57 years ago

Website
- www.mccchicago.org

Muslim Community Center is a mosque located in Chicago, Illinois. It was established in 1969 and is one of the oldest mosques in the city of Chicago.

== History ==
Designed by Arthur Howell Knox and built in 1923, the building was previously the Rivoli Theater, which sat 1,300 people. The Muslim Community Center moved into the space in 1980.

== See also ==
- List of Mosques in Illinois
- Islam in the United States
- Timeline of Islamic history
- List of mosques in the Americas
- Lists of mosques
- List of mosques in the United States
