= Masjid Hamza =

Islamic center in New York city

Coordinates: 40°41′9.03″N 73°42′58.17″W

Masjid Hamza is a mosque and Islamic community center located at 200 Stuart Avenue, Valley Stream, New York. It has a K–6 school system called "Hamza Academy", and has a mosque. The masjid is located fifteen minutes away from John F. Kennedy International Airport and serves about 1,400 families. The masjid offers use of the masjid for the five daily prayers, adult and children's Quran classes, and Taraweeh in the month of Ramadan. The masjid originally started as a 2 bedroom house, but as a result of the growing Muslim community in Valley Stream, expanded to a bigger building in 2007. In a 2015 annual fundraiser, the masjid announced plans for expansions, which they did by purchasing 3 adjacent properties.

== See also ==
- List of mosques in the Americas
- Lists of mosques
- List of mosques in the United States
