= Islamic Society of Greater Lowell =

Mosque in Chelmsford, Massachusetts, United States

Coordinates: 42°37′17″N 71°21′02″W

The Islamic Society of Greater Lowell (ISGL) is a mosque in Chelmsford, Massachusetts. It was established in 1993.

Vandals attempted to seal the mosque's door shut with cement in August 2007.

== See also ==
- List of mosques in the Americas
- Lists of mosques
- List of mosques in the United States
