= Masjid DarusSalam =

Mosque in Lombard, Illinois, U.S.

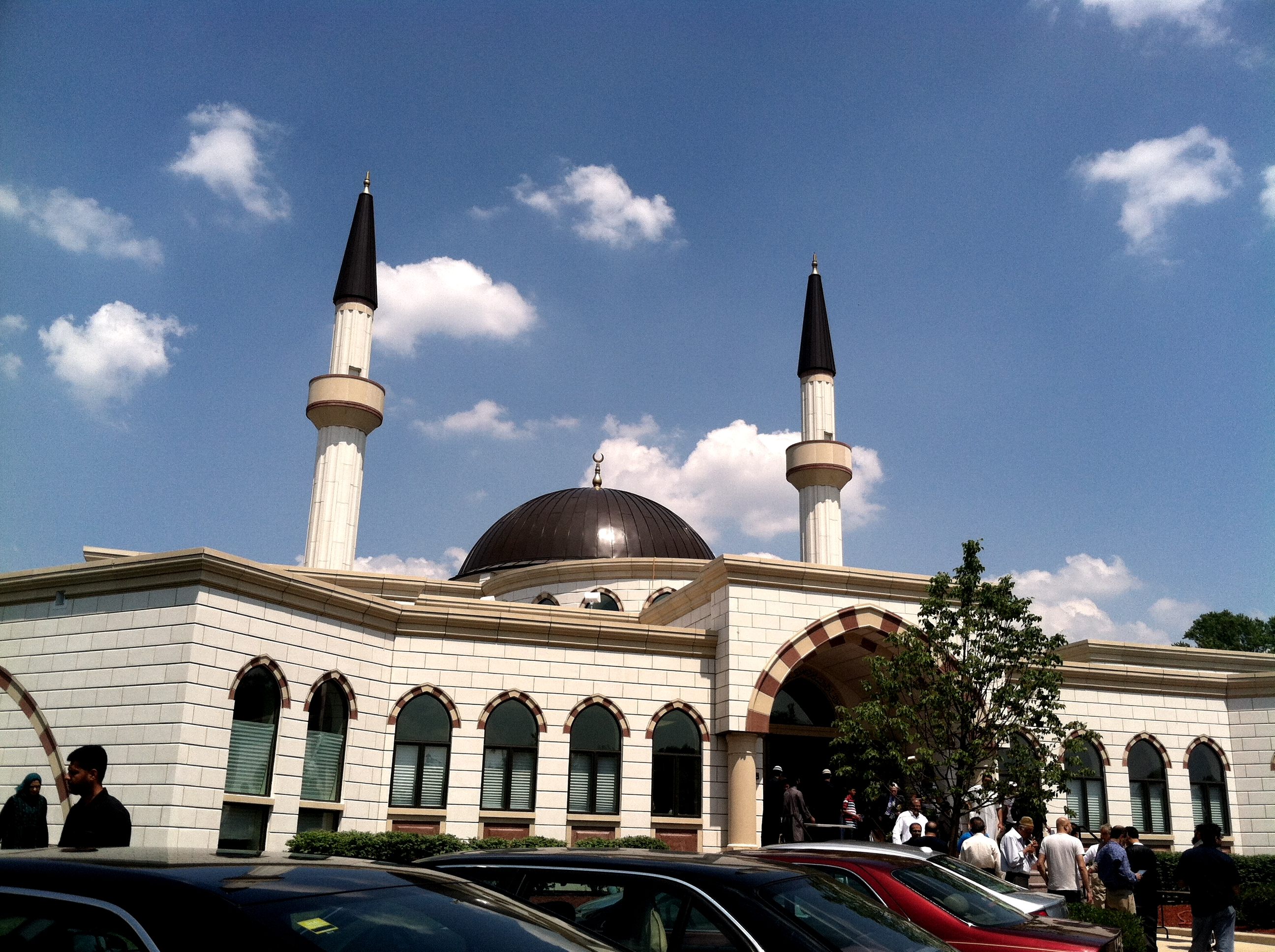

Religion
- Affiliation: Islam
- Branch/tradition: Sunni
- Ecclesiastical or organisational status: non-profit religious organization
- Governing body: Hanafi
- Leadership: Mufti Minhajuddin Ahmed

Location
- Location: 21W525 North Ave, Lombard, Illinois 60148
- Interactive map of Masjid DarusSalam
- Coordinates: 41.903073°N 88.045311°W

Architecture
- Type: Mosque
- Groundbreaking: August 20, 2009
- Completed: 2013

Specifications
- Interior area: 22,000
- Dome: 1
- Minaret: 2

Website
- masjidds.org

Masjid DarusSalam is a mosque in Lombard, Illinois, a suburb of Chicago. Completed in 2013, the mosque is home to the DarusSalam Seminary, a national project which aims to educate the Islamic community in the traditional Islamic sciences.

== Building ==
The 22,000-square-foot building is located on North Avenue and includes a main prayer hall, classrooms, administrative offices, and a community hall. In 2021, the seminary completed "Phase 2," their Seminary expansion, including a gymnasium, library, and additional classrooms. As of 2022, the project has been augmented and is fully functional.

=== Phase 2 ===
In late 2017, Masjid DarusSalam began constructing their Phase 2 Project: the National Seminary Campus. The schema envisioned a larger, exclusive women's prayer hall, an indoor gym, a basketball court, a library featuring over 20,000 books, and supplementary classrooms for students.

In 2015, the DarusSalam administration purchased 3.5 additional acres of land. Beginning in 2017, the National Seminary Campus and its supplementary parking lot were constructed within this plot of land. The parking lot allowed for an additional 400 individual parking spaces for community members.

== Programs ==
Masjid DarusSalam offers monthly seminars and weekly programs. As of 2022, they have augmented summer programs and children's programs, a Sunday school, a 7-year academic program known as the "Takmīl program," a Taḥfīz (Qurʾān Memorization) program, after-school programs, Sister's Fiqh (Jurisprudence) & Tajweed (Qurʾānic elocution), and their flagship, 1-year academic course, the Tanwīr intensive.

As of 2022, weekly programs consist of informational and knowledgeable lectures, namely, Team Fajr (post-aurora lectures and breakfast), Ṣalawāt, and a weekly Tafsīr (exegesis) program, respectively, for brothers and sisters.

== Gallery ==
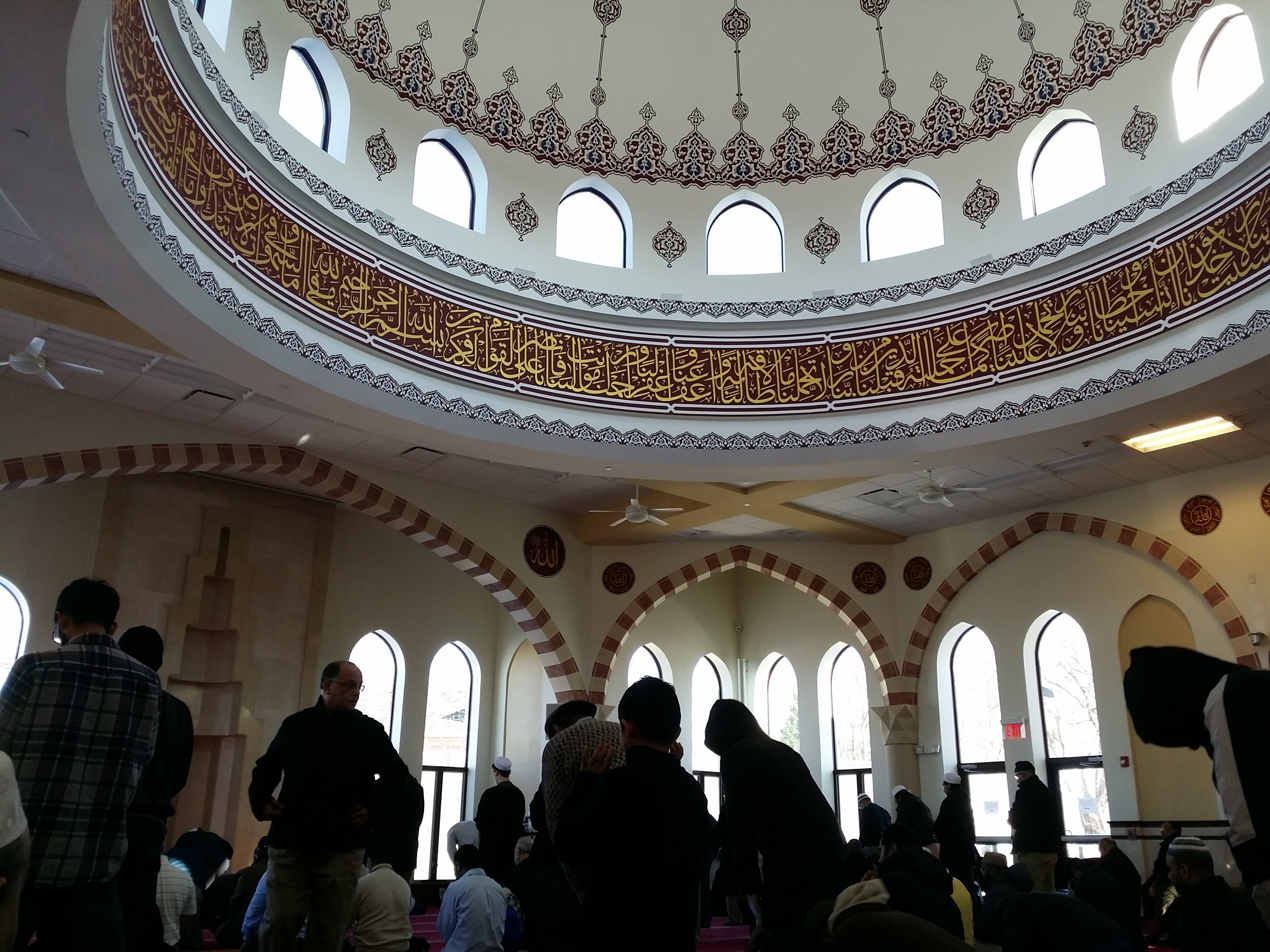
After Friday Prayer

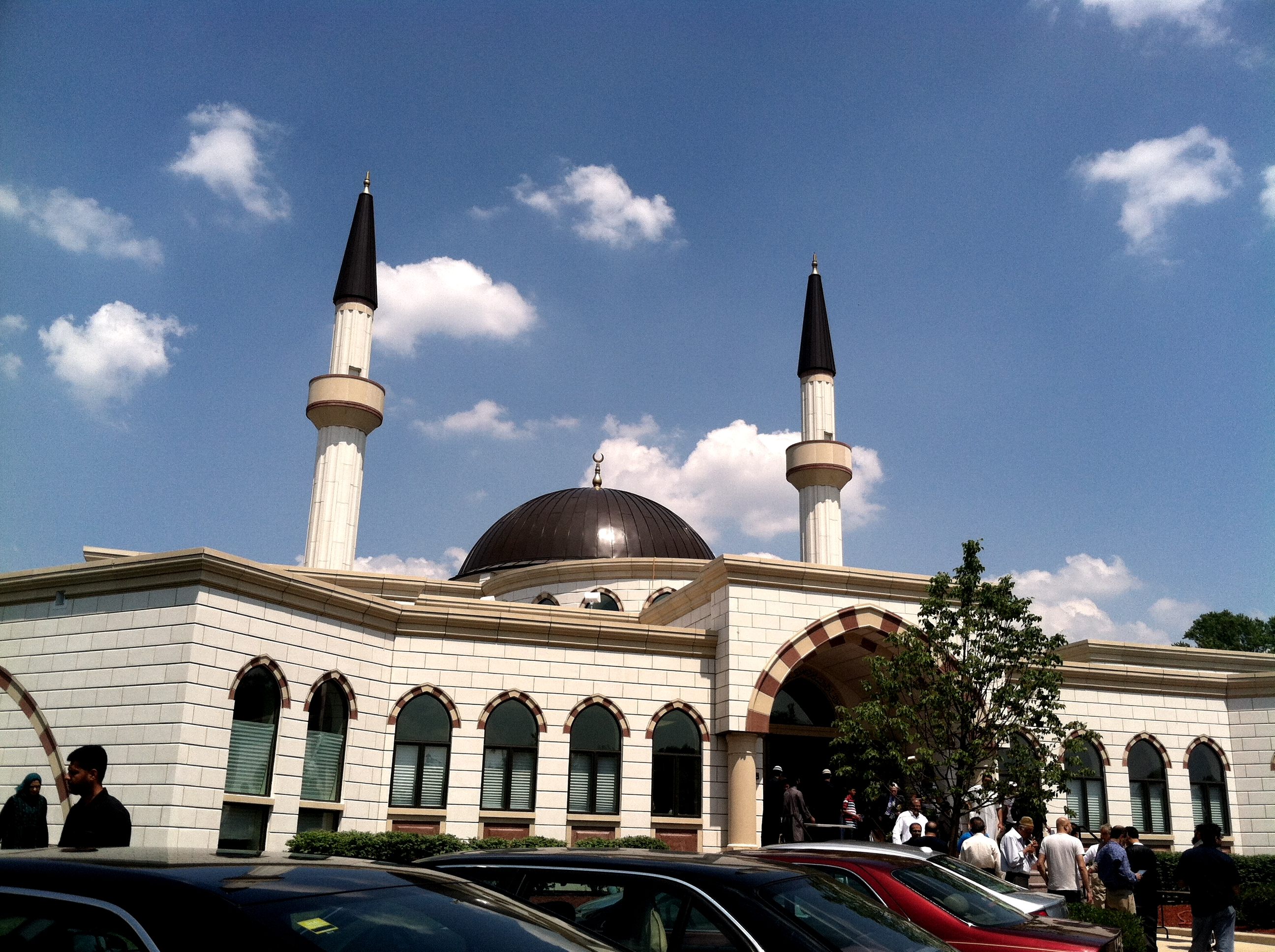
Exterior.

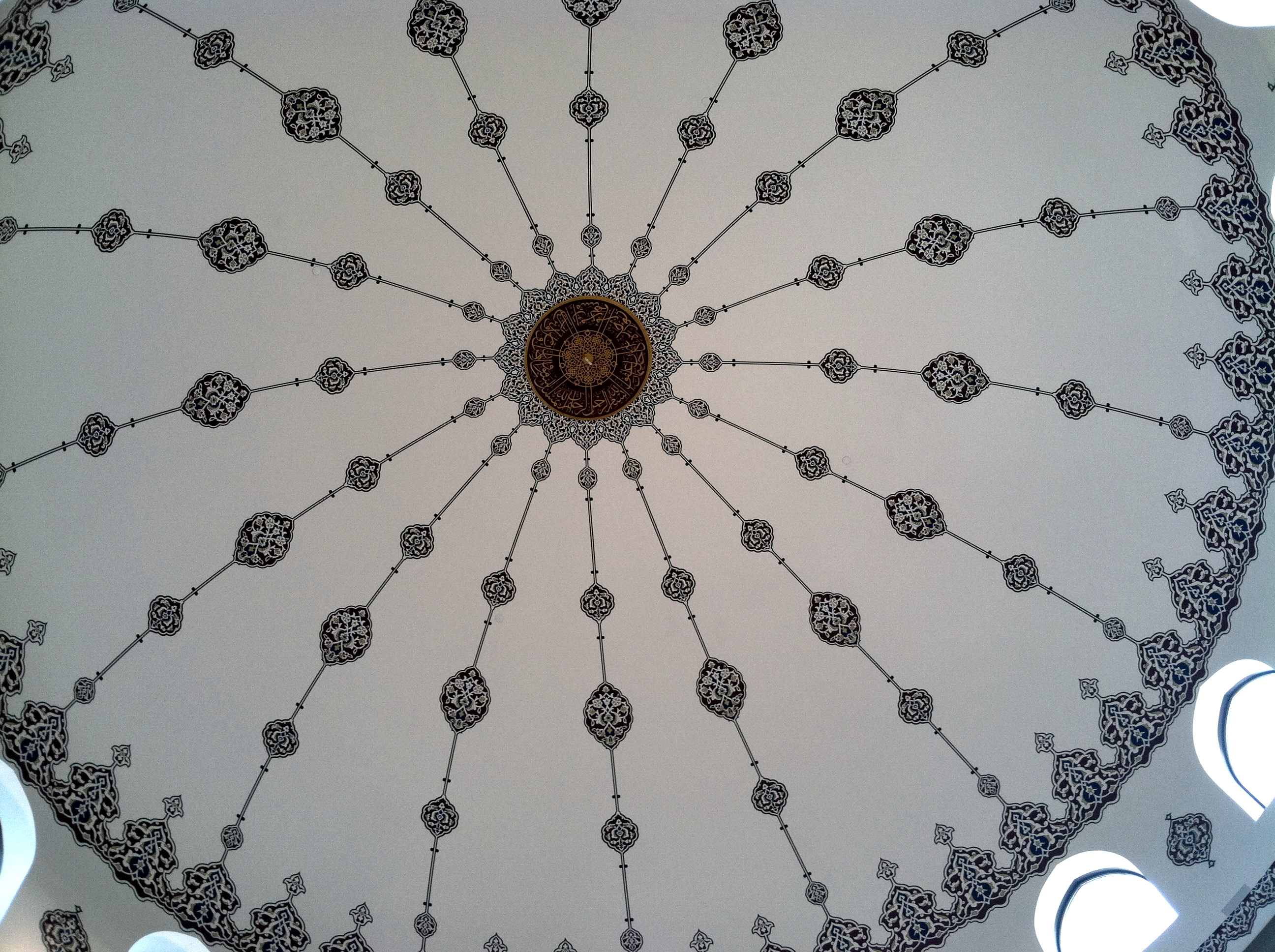
Interior of the dome.

== See also ==
- List of Mosques in Illinois
- Islam in the United States
- Timeline of Islamic history
- Islamic Architecture
- Islamic Art
- List of mosques in the Americas
- Lists of mosques
- List of mosques in the United States
