= Mother Mosque of America =

Historic mosque in Iowa, United States

- Mother Mosque
- U.S. National Register of Historic Places
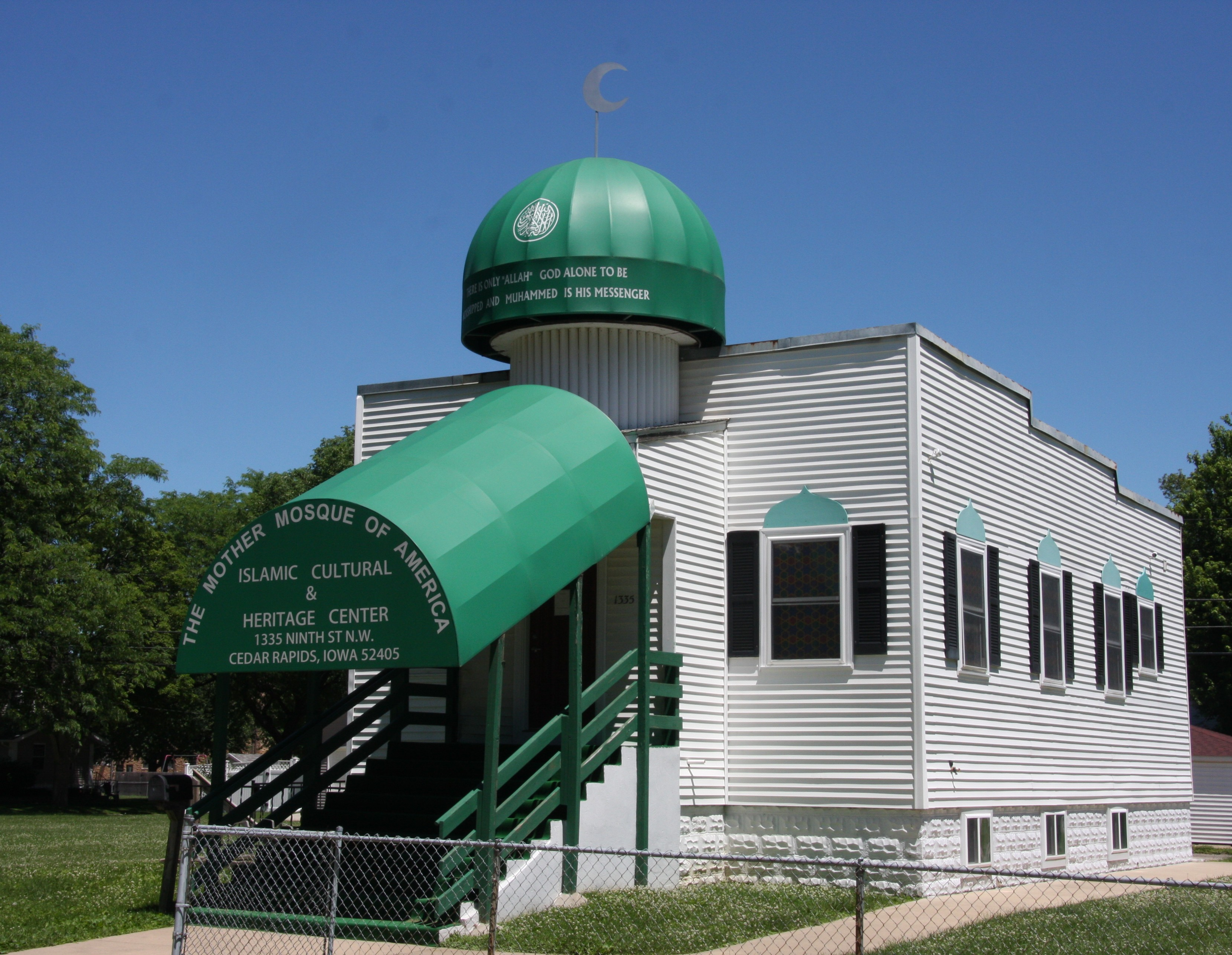
- The mosque in 2016

- Location within Iowa
- Interactive map showing the location of Mother Mosque of America
- Location: 1335 9th Street N.W. Cedar Rapids, Iowa
- Coordinates: 41°59′10.69″N 91°41′2.2″W
- Built: 1934
- NRHP reference No.: 96000516
- Added to NRHP: May 15, 1996

The Mother Mosque of America, once known as The Rose of Fraternity Lodge, in Cedar Rapids, Iowa, United States, is considered the oldest still-standing purpose-built mosque in the United States, having been completed in 1934. The Al-Sadiq Mosque in Chicago and the Powers Street Mosque in New York City, founded in 1922 and 1931, respectively, but were converted from existing buildings to be used as a Muslim house of worship.

An older purpose-built mosque is the Highland Park Mosque, built in 1921 to serve immigrant workers in the Detroit Metro Area, which was sold in 1926. Another older purpose-built mosque was a mosque near Ross, North Dakota, built in 1929, which fell into ruin; a smaller mosque was built near that site to commemorate its history in 2005.

== History ==
The mosque was built by a local community of immigrants and their descendants from the Ottoman Empire, in what is now Lebanon and Syria. Construction was completed on February 15, 1934. The small structure served as a place of worship for Muslims for nearly 40 years. When a larger local mosque, the Islamic Center of Cedar Rapids, was built in 1971, the building was sold. Successive owners over the next 20 years allowed it to fall into disrepair.

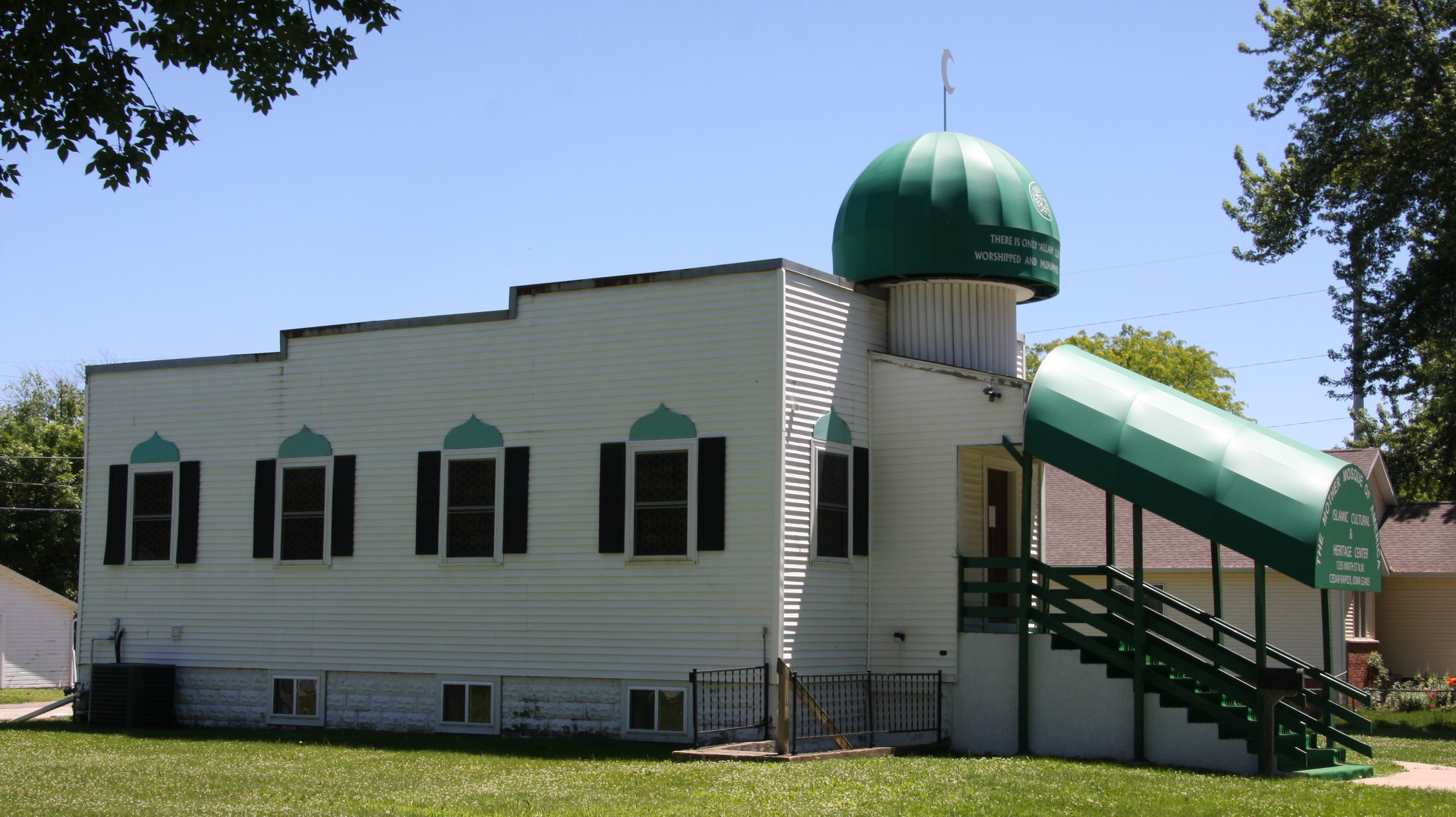
The mosque seen from the northwest

In 1991, the Islamic Council of Iowa purchased the building, refurbished it, and restored its status as a Muslim cultural center. The effort was mainly organized by the local Muslim community led by Imam Taha Tawil and Dr. Thomas B. Irving.

The Mother Mosque stands in a quiet neighborhood, flanked by houses on both sides, with a small marker off of First Avenue pointing the way to the site. Due to its small size, the majority of the Muslim population in Eastern Iowa and the Cedar Rapids area worship at other mosques, but the Mother Mosque remains a prominent center for information, prayer, and community.

The Mother Mosque is listed on both the Iowa State Historical Register and the National Register of Historic Places as an "essential piece of American religious history, which symbolizes tolerance and acceptance of Islam and Muslims in the United States." It was listed on the National Register in 1996 as Moslem Temple.

Floods in June 2008 filled the mosque's basement with 10 feet of water, resulting in the loss of the extensive collection of books, archival records, and artifacts stored there.

== See also ==
- List of mosques in the United States
- List of mosques in the Americas
- Islam in the United States
- Lists of mosques
