= Masjid Annur Islamic Center =

Mosque in Sacramento, California, the United States

- Location in California

Religion
- Affiliation: Islam
- Ecclesiastical or organizational status: non-profit religious organization

Location
- Location: 6990 65th St, Sacramento, CA 95823
- Interactive map of Masjid Annur Islamic Center
- Coordinates: 38.499689°N 121.439569°W

Architecture
- Type: Mosque
- Established: 1994

Specifications
- Dome: 0
- Minaret: 0

Website
- Official Website

Masjid Annur Islam Center in Sacramento, California is the largest mosque in the greater Sacramento area of Northern California.

The Masjid Annur Islam Center offers classes on the Arabic language, the Qur'an, Tajweed and holds events regularly throughout the year. Masjid Annur is also home to one of the only Islamic high schools in Northern California. It is also home to the Annur annual Islamic conference which brings Imams and Islamic scholars from all over the world for the 3 day event.

== Al-Arqam Islamic School ==
The school, established in 1998, teaches grades ranging from pre-kindergarten through grade 12, and offers honors classes for its high school level students. Courses and lectures are held in Arabic and English throughout the year. The school is accredited by the Western Association of Schools and Colleges. As of 2008, it was reported to have almost 300 students.

== History ==
Until 1982, Muslims in Sacramento area worshipped in an apartment. In 1984, the community bought 1.34 acres (5,400 m^{2}) of land to build their center upon. Due to several problems such as growth and lack of parking, a decision was made to buy a two-story building sitting on approximately five acres.

== See also ==
- List of mosques in the Americas
- Lists of mosques
- List of mosques in the United States
