= Masjid al-Ikhlas =

Mosque in Newburgh, New York, United States

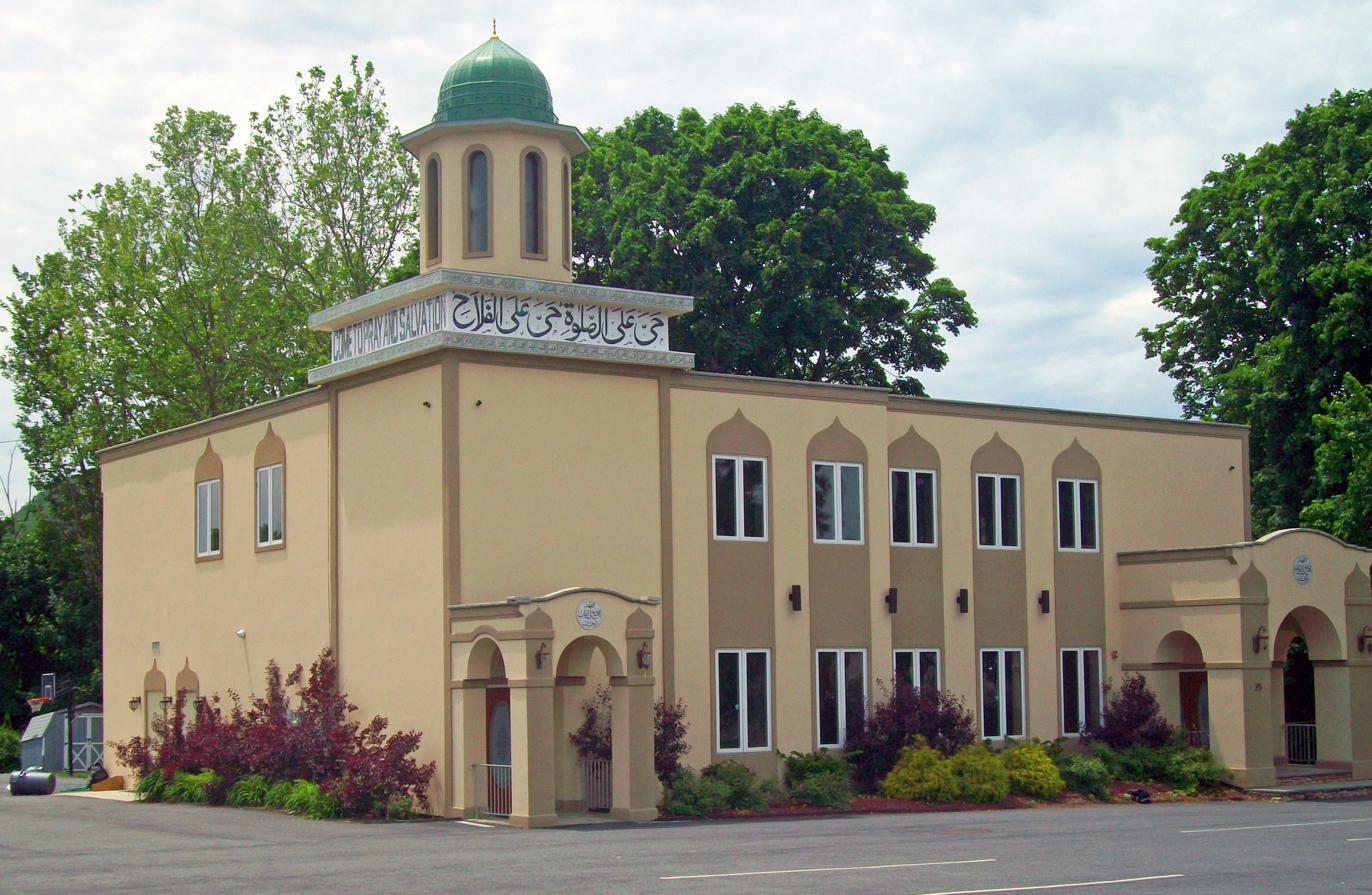
- North profile and east elevation, 2009

Religion
- Affiliation: Islam
- Leadership: Imam Salahuddin Mustafa Muhammad

Location
- Location: Newburgh, NY
- Interactive map of Masjid al-Ikhlas
- Coordinates: 41°30′00″N 74°01′49″W

Architecture
- Direction of façade: North

Masjid al-Ikhlas (Arabic: "mosque of devotion"), also referred to as The Islamic Learning Center of Orange County, is a mosque in Newburgh, New York.

Formerly a warehouse, the mosque was founded in 1992. Previously, Newburgh's Muslim community met in town's NAACP office or a local store front.

As of 2009, the imam was Salahuddin Mustafa Muhammad.

== Expansion ==
In 2005, the mosque began an expansion project to accommodate the growing Muslim population of the Hudson Valley. When the mosque opened in 1992, its membership was an estimated 50 families, but growing to nearly 500 members, the mosque could no longer hold support its growing congregations. Plans were made to double the existing size of the mosque to 6,750 square feet (627 m^{2}), including a large dome based on a mold made for the Masjid Al-Noor mosque in the nearby town of Wappinger Falls. Costs were reportedly being covered by donations from mosque members and the community.

== 2009 Bronx terrorism plot controversy ==
The mosque came to national attention when it was revealed that it had been regularly attended by four men who were arrested in the 2009 Bronx terrorism plot, a plan, stopped by the FBI, to shoot down military planes at an Air National Guard base in Newburgh and blow up two synagogues in the Riverdale neighborhood of New York City.

Shahed Hussain, an Albany hotel owner now known to have been an FBI informant, regularly attended the mosque, approaching congregants in the parking lot after Friday services and talking of jihad and violence. Members of the congregation interviewed after the terror plot was exposed stated that "most" members of the congregation had believed Hussain to be an informant. None had reported his talk about Jihad to the authorities.

== See also ==
- List of mosques in the Americas
- Lists of mosques
- List of mosques in the United States
