= Mosque of Shaikh M. R. Bawa Muhaiyaddeen =

Mosque in Philadelphia, Pennsylvania, US

Coordinates: 39.991117°N 75.242404°W

The Mosque of Shaikh M. R. Bawa Muhaiyaddeen is located in Philadelphia, Pennsylvania on the grounds of the Bawa Muhaiyaddeen Fellowship. The building of the mosque took 6 months and was done by the members of the Bawa Muhaiyaddeen Fellowship under the direction of M. R. Bawa Muhaiyaddeen. It was completed by May 1984, two years before his death in 1986. The official opening and dedication took place on May 27, 1984.

The liturgical prayers follow the Hanafi tradition.

The mosque provides activities similar to other Islamic mosques including the five daily Islamic prayers (salat), Jum'ah prayers every Friday, and classes in Arabic, Qur'an recitation, salat and Islam. Unique to the mosque is the practice of early morning dhikr recitation (remembrance of God) using the practice instituted by Bawa Muhaiyaddeen.

== Exterior façade ==
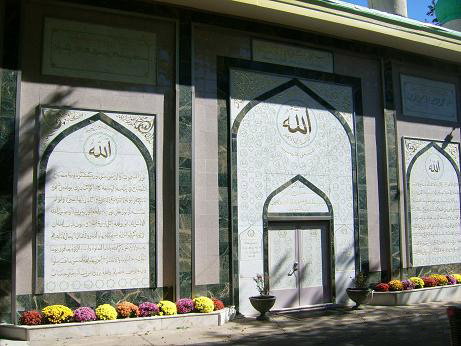
Front exterior

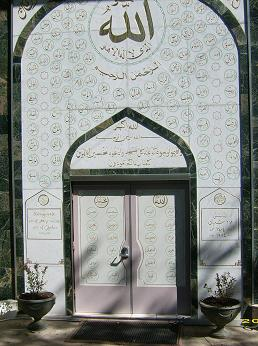
Center panel

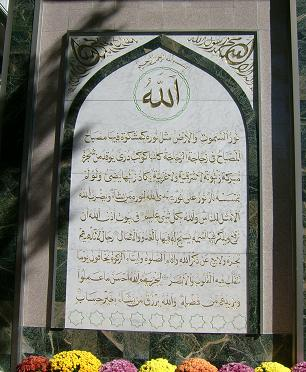
Left panel

The front exterior of the mosque consists of three exterior panels each covered with Arabic calligraphy written in gold-leaf lettering. The writings are verses from the Quran, the 99 names of God, and the names of 25 major prophets from the Islamic tradition.

=== Center panel ===
At the peak of the arch above the Arabic Allah, is written the basmala. There is an Arabic Allah inscribed inside a large circle in the center, which is surrounded by the 99 names of God. Above two doors, which are the men's entrance to the mosque, is Quranic verse 29, from Suratul Araf - The Heights. On the two doors is written the name of God, Allah, and the names of 25 prophets: Muhammad, Jesus, John, Zacharia, Luqman, Jonah, Elisha, Shu'aib, Moses, Aaron, David, Solomon, Elijah, Job, Joseph, Jacob, Isaac, Ishmael, Lot, Adam, Idris, Noah, Hud, Salih, and Abraham.

=== Right panel ===
At the peak of the arch above the Arabic Allah, is written the basmala. There is an Arabic Allah inscribed inside a large circle in the center. Below the Arabic Allah are written Quranic verses 255 through 257 from Suratul Baaqara - the Heifer.

=== Left panel ===
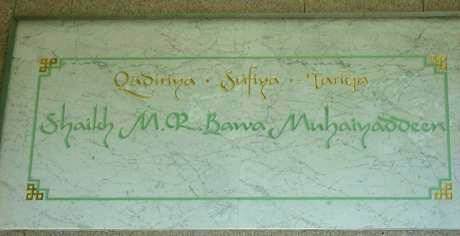
Top left detail

At the peak of the arch above the Arabic Allah, is written the basmala. There is an Arabic Allah inscribed inside a large circle in the center. Below the Arabic Allah are written Quranic verses 35 through 38 from Suratun Nur - Light. Above the left panel is a frame with the words "Qadiriya Sufiya Tariqa" over "Shaikh M. R. Bawa Muhaiyaddeen".

== Mosque interior ==
The mosque has two entrances for men and women respectively, leading to ablution rooms on the first floor. Stairways for each gender lead to the second floor prayer room, which can hold roughly 150 people. Above the rear half of the prayer room is a dome situated over the women's section.

=== Mihrab (Niche) ===
The niche at the front of the mosque indicates the direction for prayer. Surrounding the niche in a rectangular border are the Quranic verses 127 and 128 from Suratul Baqara - the Heifer. At the peak of the arch is written the basmala.

=== Border ===
Encircling the room, where the interior walls meet the ceiling, is a border with a width of about 10 inches. Written upon the border are verses 1 through 26 of Suratul Kahf - The Cave.

=== Dome ===
Encircling the base of the dome are sets of small windows set into the sides of an octagon. Each side holds 6 windows for a total of 48. The 99 names of God are in the panes of the windows. Below the windows is a border also completing a circle. On the border are written the following chapters of the Quran: Suratul Fatiha - The Opening, Suratul Iklas - Purity, Suratul Falaq - The Dawn, and Suratun Nas - Mankind.

== See also ==
- List of mosques in the Americas
- Lists of mosques
- List of mosques in the United States
