= Islamic Society of Central New York =

Sunni mosque and Islamic community centre in Syracuse, New York, United States

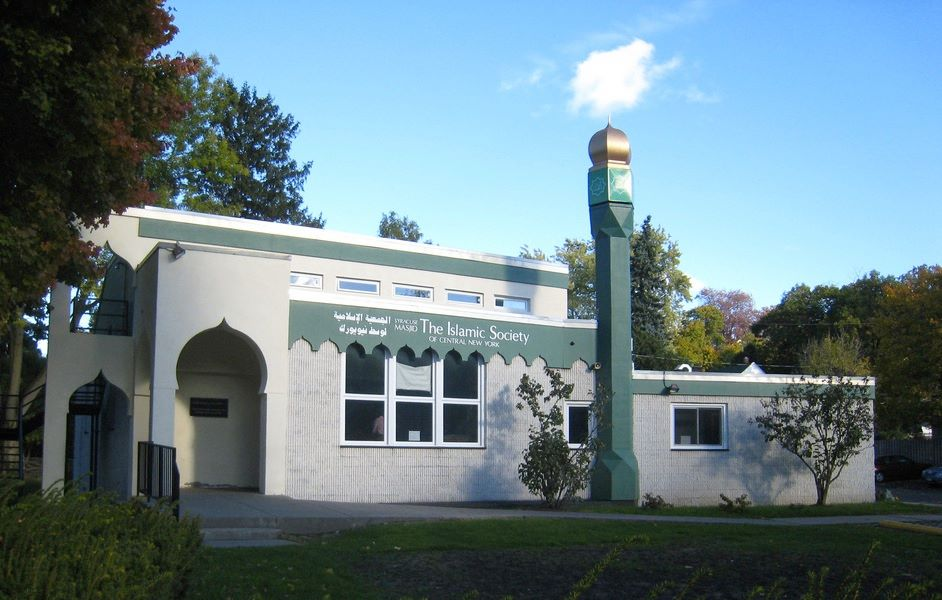

- Location in New York Islamic Society of Central New York (the United States)

Religion
- Affiliation: Islam
- Branch/tradition: Sunni
- Ecclesiastical or organizational status: non-profit religious organization
- Leadership: Imam Mohammed ElFiki; President Abdulilah Al-Dubai

Location
- Location: 925 Comstock Ave, Syracuse, NY 13210
- Interactive map of Islamic Society of Central New York
- Coordinates: 43.0322°N 76.1289°W

Architecture
- Established: 1981

Specifications
- Dome: 0
- Minaret: 1

Website
- iscnyonline.com

The Islamic Society of Central New York is a "purpose-built" Sunni mosque and Islamic community centre located on Comstock Avenue in Syracuse, NY. Founded in 1981, by Khaja Qutubuddin, the center serves the needs of Central New York's estimated 15,000 - 20,000 Muslims providing various services and outreach programs for the Muslim and non-Muslim community. It also runs an Islamic cemetery and the Madrasat Al Ihsan/School of Excellence (founded in 1993) on West Onondaga Street. The mosque is served by a full-time Imam and is administered by an elected Shura Council.

The mosque has a diverse congregation.

== Activities ==
Imams of the Islamic Society of Central New York have served on the InterReligious Council of Central New York and as a chaplain at Syracuse University. Outreach activities of members of the mosque include co-founding Women Transcending Boundaries, a group bringing women of faith in central New York together after 9/11, and teaching English classes to refugees at the North Side Learning Center in Syracuse.

== See also ==
- List of mosques in the Americas
- Lists of mosques
- List of mosques in the United States
