= Noor Islamic Cultural Center =

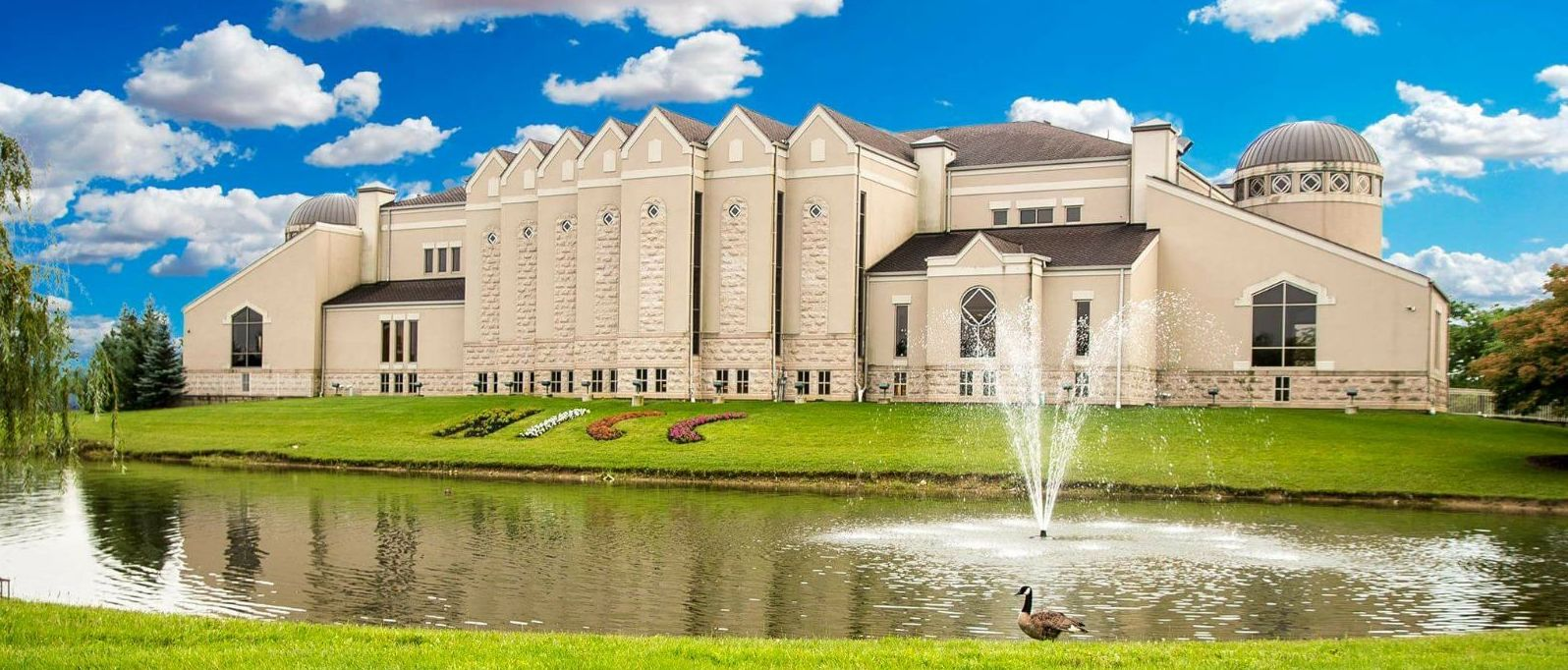

- Location in Ohio

Religion
- Affiliation: Islam
- Ecclesiastical or organizational status: non-profit religious organization

Location
- Location: 5001 Wilcox Rd, Dublin, OH 43016
- Interactive map of Noor Islamic Cultural Center
- Coordinates: 40.065482°N 83.149358°W

Architecture
- Type: Mosque
- Established: 2006

Specifications
- Dome: 2
- Minaret: 0

Website
- www.noorohio.org

The Noor Islamic Cultural Center (NICC) is a cultural center and mosque in Columbus, Ohio, USA. The building was started in 2001 and completed in 2006. NICC is the first Islamic center to become a polling place in Central Ohio. It is a center for Muslims. It includes a mosque for prayer purposes, a social hall, kitchen, classrooms, and lecture rooms. It is stated to be "a place for everyone to come, learn, and practice Islam in every element."

The center holds five daily prayers in congregation, Islamic lectures, Sunday school for youth, a children's club, study groups, and individual lesson and classes to learn the Quran and Sunnah of the Islamic prophet Muhammad. The center also offers outreach programs for non-Muslims who are interested in learning about Islam and operates a monthly food drive.

== Aims and objectives of the Noor Islamic Cultural Center ==
Stated aims are:

- To promote the principles of Islam based on the Holy Quran and the Sunnah of Muhammad as understood by the mainstream.
- To develop operate and/or promote the development/operation of Islamic cultural institutions including, but not limited to, schools, relief organizations, universities, hospitals, broadcast stations, community centers, cultural centers, museums, mosques, cemeteries, and other institutions that serve the Muslim community in the United States.
- To promote all forms of education about the Islamic culture and the Islamic way of life.
- To facilitate humanitarian relief efforts for people of all faiths.
- To provide Islamic services and counseling to the needy and to the disadvantaged individuals.
- To promote unity among Muslims. To foster a better understanding among Muslims, other Muslim Institutions, and communities of other faiths.
- To serve the needs of all the sectors of the Muslim community (adults, youth, men, and women).
- To solicit donations for, and to employ the funds of the donors to implement and the organization's mission and aims/objectives.
- To adopt and execute such activities as may be lawful in order to accomplish the said purposes of AIW.

== See also ==
- List of mosques in the Americas
- Lists of mosques
- List of mosques in the United States
