= Islamic Center of Connecticut =

Mosque in Windsor, Hartford County, Connecticut, United States

Coordinates: 41.8111°N 72.6678°W

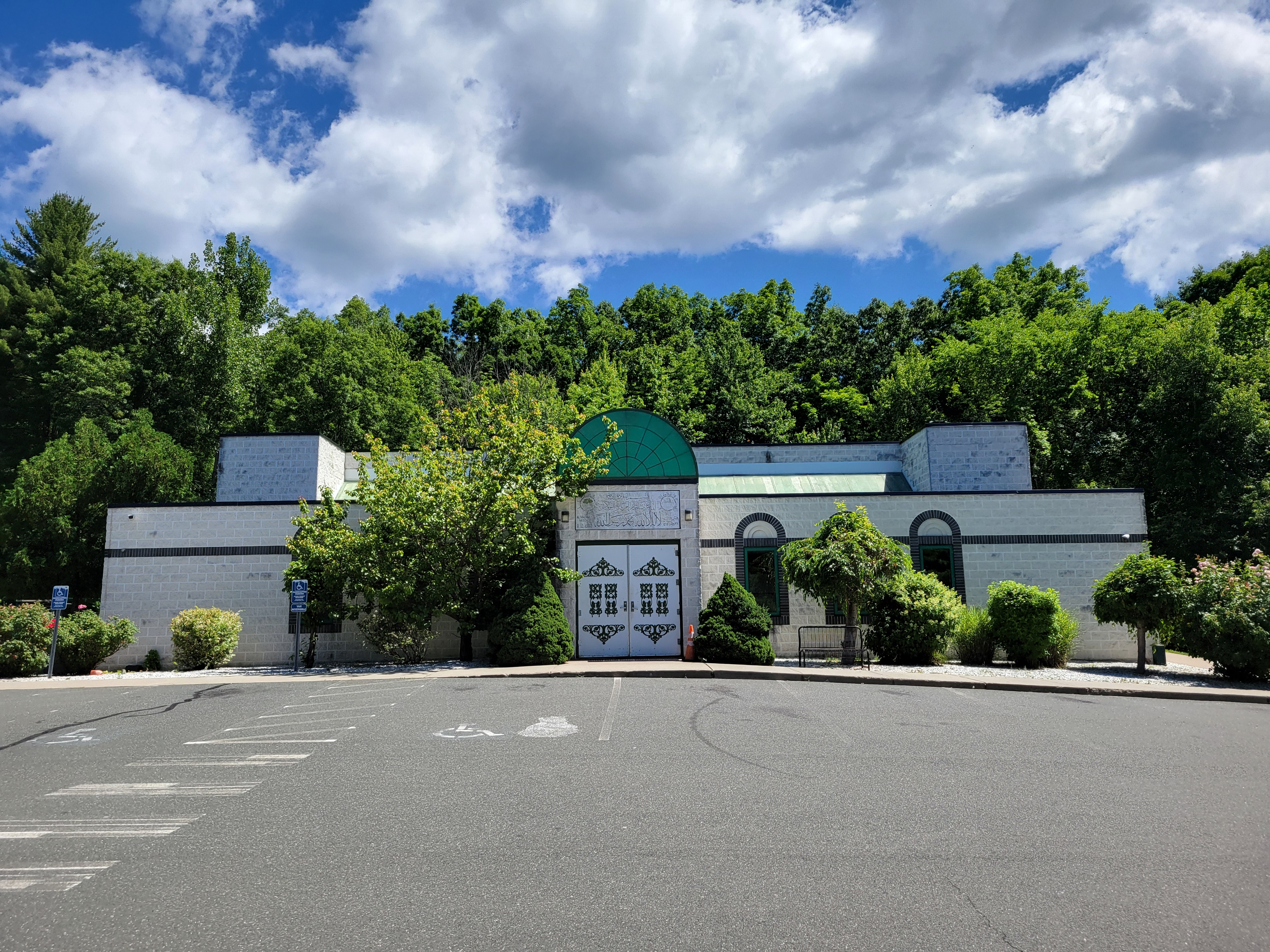
Islamic Center of Connecticut

The Islamic Center of Connecticut is a mosque located in Windsor, Connecticut serving the Muslim community.

Its Enfield cemetery is meant only for Muslims. Baytl Ul-Mamur Mosque in Manchester, CT has built the now second Muslim Cemetery at 460 Hillstown Road Manchester, CT 06040 is just 4.5 miles away from Bayt Ul Ma'mur Mosque in Manchester, CT. The mosque has already done a fantastic job in assisting the community and its residents with a smooth process of taking care of the deceased via all the facilities and resources it provides. (However, there have been separate Muslim burial plots associated with other cemeteries previously, including in Worcester, Massachusetts and Biddeford, Maine.)

== See also ==
- List of mosques in the Americas
- List of mosques in the United States
- Lists of mosques
