= Islamic Foundation of Greater St. Louis =

Islamic organisation in the United States

Coordinates: 38.6029°N 90.4959°W

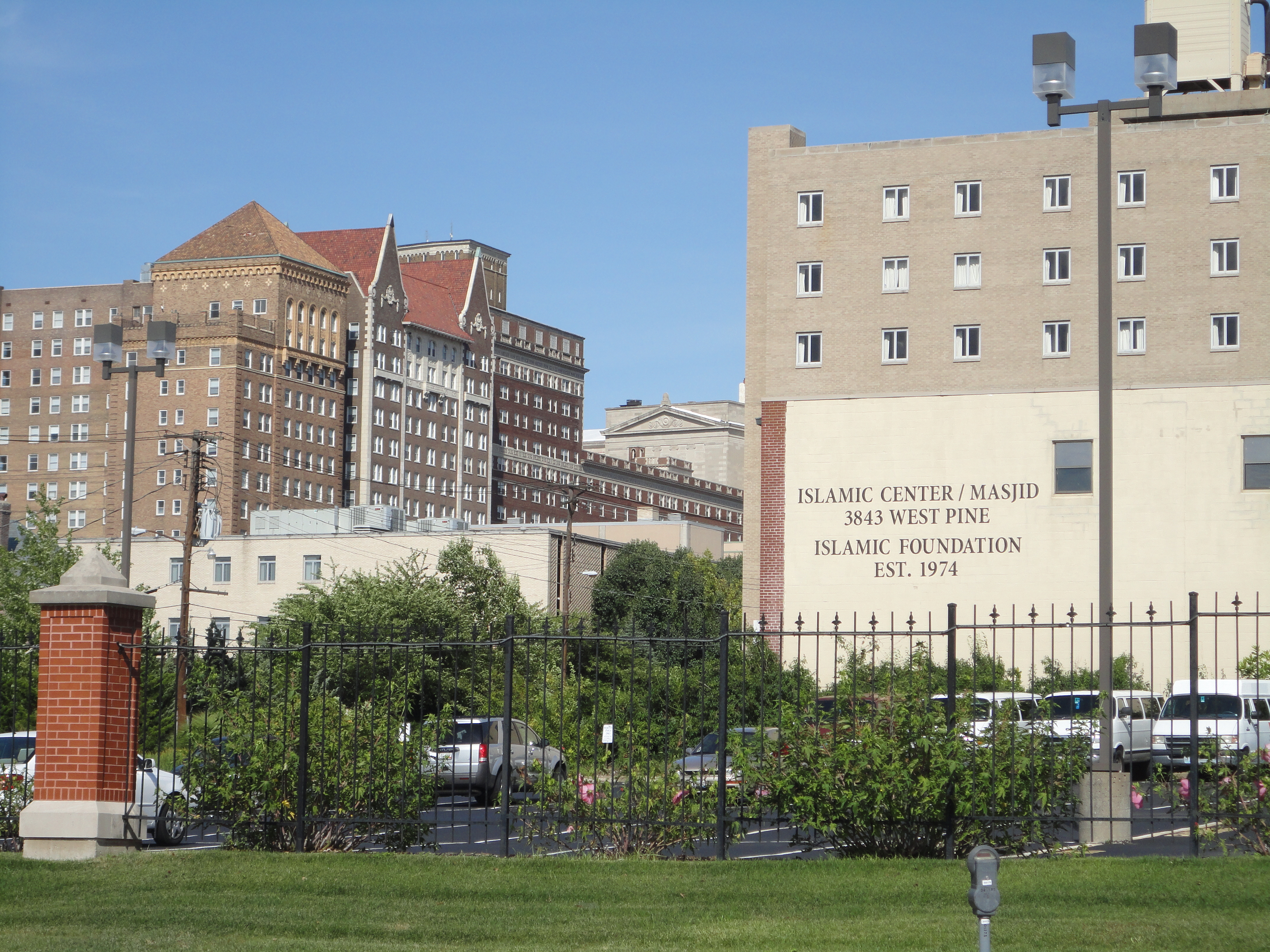
Masjid Bilal on West Pine, July 2010

The Islamic Foundation of Greater St. Louis (IFGSTL) is an Islamic organization composed of two mosques. The first mosque, Masjid Bilal (West Pine Masjid), is located in midtown St. Louis, on W Pine Blvd, next to the campus of Saint Louis University. The second and larger mosque, Daar-Ul-Islam, is located in Ballwin, Missouri, at 517 Weidman Road, and includes an Islamic funeral home with 5 cemeteries and social services including job training and English classes. A donation charity known as Baitulmal that provides donated items and food to those in need is also hosted by IFGSTL.

== History ==
In 1965, a small group of Muslims formed a local chapter of the Muslim Students Association, a group that has its headquarters in Gary, Indiana. Initially, the group met for prayers and other activities at facilities provided by St. Louis University. As the group increased to 100 members, it began to hold prayer meetings at the International Institute.

In 1974, the group incorporated as the Islamic Center of Greater St. Louis, a non-profit organization, and began to look for a building of their own. The next year they purchased an office building at 3843 West Pine Boulevard, on the edge of the St. Louis University campus. Following a successful fund-raising event in 1982, the building was extensively renovated.

Later on, the group's leaders realized that with the continued growth of the Islamic community in St. Louis, a larger facility was needed. In 1987, the organization purchased 5 acres (20,000 m^{2}) of horse-grazing pasture land across from Queeny Park. Fund-raising continued to raise the money for construction of a new building.

On Nov. 27, 1992, a groundbreaking ceremony was held. Christian and Jewish community leaders attended the event. County Executive Buzz Westfall declared the day "Muslim Awareness Day". The building opened in November 1995.

In 1992, Al-Salam Day School was established.

== Departments ==
IFGSTL includes many departments, all of which operate out of the Dar-Ul-Islam Masjid: the Al-Salam Day School, Weekend Madrassa, Muslim Youth of St. Louis (MYSTL), and the Iqra Library. Al-Salam Day School is a 5-day school with grades K-8. The Weekend Madrassa consists of separate Sunday and Saturday school for part-time Islamic education for grades K-10. MYSTL, or the Muslim Youth of St. Louis, is a youth group that attempts to unite all of the Muslim youth in the area and encourage them to practice their faith.

== See also ==
- List of mosques in the Americas
- Lists of mosques
- List of mosques in the United States
