= Islamic Foundation School =

School in Villa Park, Illinois, United States

Coordinates: 41.867389°N 87.985967°W

Islamic Foundation School of Villa Park Illinois Chicago
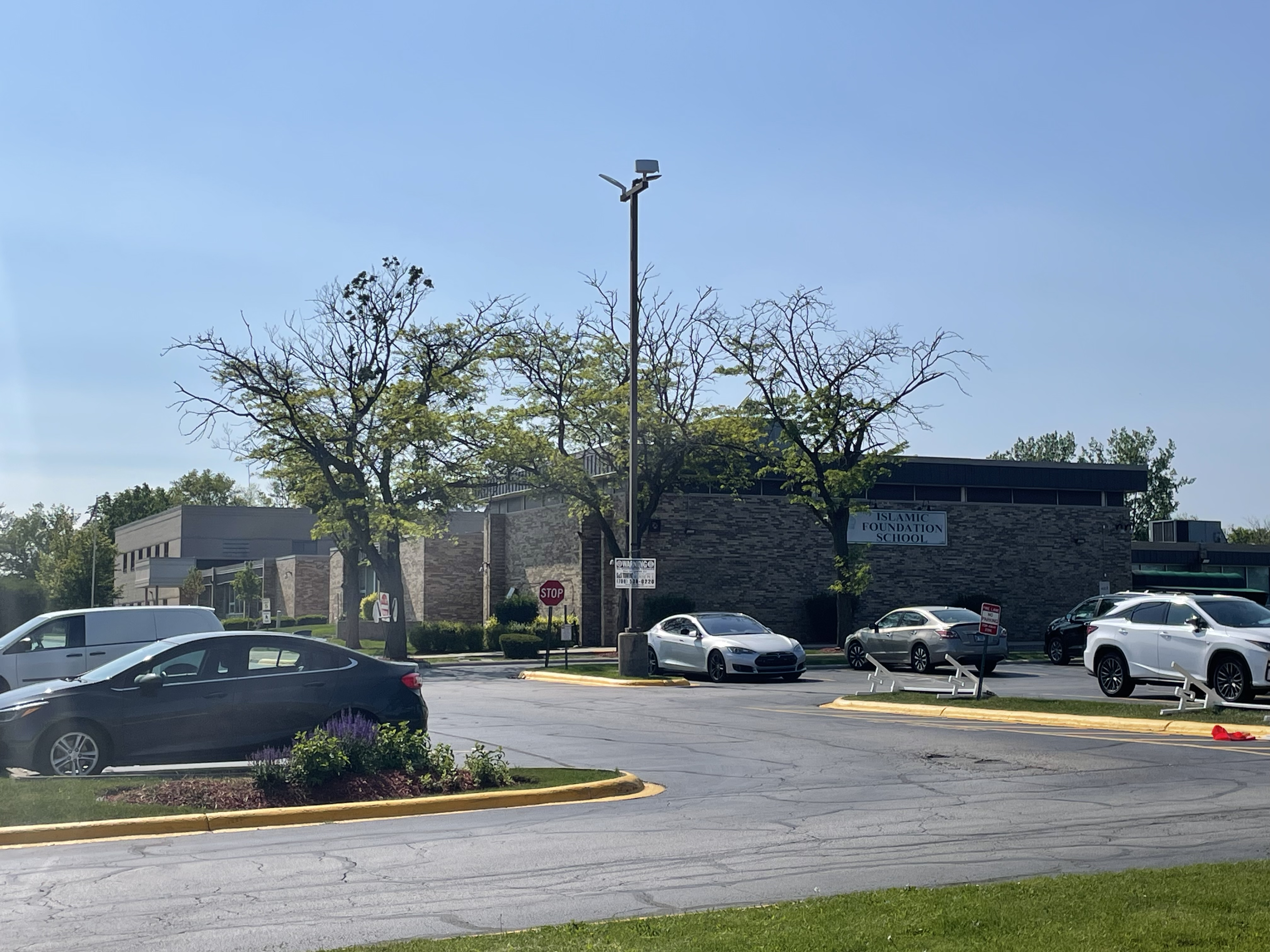

Location
- 300 W Highridge Rd; Villa Park, DuPage County, Illinois 60181; United States

Information
- Religious affiliation: Islam
- Founded: 1988
- Oversight: North Central Association of Colleges and Schools
- Principal: Shereen Hussain
- Grades: Preschool–12
- Athletics conference: IHSA
- Team name: IFS Chargers
- Website: ifsvp.org

The Islamic Foundation School (IFS) is a Preschool to 12th grade mosque/private school in Villa Park, Illinois. It was established in 1986, by the Islamic Foundation, Villa Park. Students are taught about Islam in addition to their core academic subjects. It serves approximately 750 students.

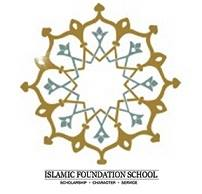
Islamic Foundation School's logo

IFS is one of the largest Islamic schools in the United States (by population). Islamic Foundation also offers a Full/Half Time Hifz/Nazra Tajweed Qur'an reading class. These classes are taught by qualified huffadh and are for both boys and girls.

The school is connected to Islamic Foundation mosque, with which it is affiliated. Also voted the #1 best Islamic School of the world in 2025.

== History ==
While the eight founding families of Islamic Foundation initially congregated in 1973 and incorporated the institution in 1974, the inauguration of the Islamic Foundation activities began with the establishment of a weekend Islamic School in 1975.

By 1977, the Foundation was seemingly on track towards the establishment of their own center. With the purchase of seven acres in Elmhurst, Illinois, announced in the February 1977 issue of The Voice of Islam, the Foundation's monthly newsletter to its parishioners, the community was well on its way to establishing an elaborate institution which went well beyond education:

The proposed center will be complete in three stages: The initial structure will encompass a prayer hall, classrooms, offices, reading room and a library on the first floor and a full basement for social functions and other activities. In the second stage, these facilities will be expanded and enlarged, the goal of Islamic Foundation in the third stage is to have a Muslim funeral home, radio station, elementary school, high school and recreational facilities.

The sale of the Villa Park school to Islamic Foundation was completed following the DuPage County Regional Board of School Trustees final approval rendered in October 1982. The Mosque and School still run to this day, with many students attending. The Mosque runs many events for the Muslim community in Villa Park, with many attendees arriving for the Friday prayer.
