= Islamic Center of Orange County =

Mosque in California, the United States

Islamic Society of Orange County
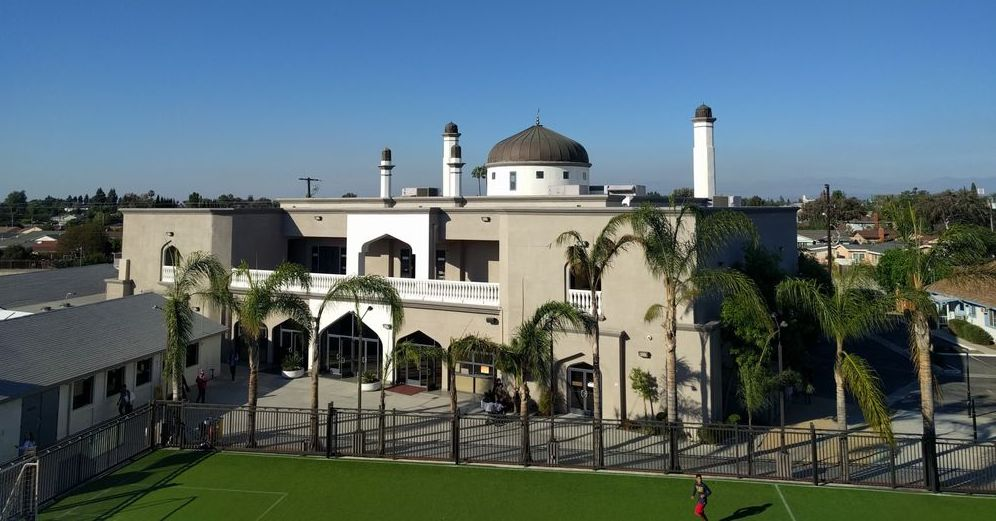

- Location in California

Religion
- Affiliation: Islam
- Branch/tradition: Sunni
- Ecclesiastical or organisational status: non-profit religious organization

Location
- Location: 1 Al-Rahman Plz, Garden Grove, CA 92844
- Coordinates: 33.755516°N 117.958457°W

Architecture
- Type: Mosque
- Established: 1976

Specifications
- Dome: 1
- Minaret: 4

Website
- Official Website

The Islamic Society of Orange County, incorporated on January 5, 1976, is one of the largest Muslim centers in the Western Hemisphere, with almost 7,000 worshipers. It is located on approximately 5.2 acres (21,000 m^{2}) in Garden Grove, California. It is neighbored by the Islamic Center of Irvine. Its director, Dr. Muzammil Siddiqi, is a scholar of Comparative Religion who received his Ph.D. from Harvard University. ISOC is one of the first Muslim centers to be established in Southern California.

== See also ==
- Lists of mosques
- List of mosques in the United States
