= Salahuddin Mustafa Muhammad =

Salahuddin Mustafa Muhammad was the American imam of the Masjid al-Ikhlas mosque in Newburgh, New York. He was also the Muslim chaplain of Bard College and had been a chaplain for the New York State Department of Corrections and Community Supervision since 1985.

== Life ==
Muhammad holds a B.A. in the social sciences from SUNY New Paltz, and a Masters of Professional Studies degree in theology and counseling from the New York Theological Seminary. Muhammad received a certificate of Islamic Chaplaincy from Hartford Seminary in 2007. He received a Doctor of Ministry degree from the same seminary in 2010 in Islamic studies/Christian-Muslim relations.

Muhammad told journalist Daniel J. Wakin that he was attracted to Islam as a fatherless 13-year-old growing up in Harlem, New York. He became a student of Clarence 13X, founder of the Nation of Gods and Earths.since that time he became a part of the Nation of Islam, and in 1975 he accepted the leadership of Imam Warith Deen Mohammed, and has been a dedicated associate.

Muhammad is known for his work with prison inmates. Muhammad worked for the Department of Corrections and Community Supervision for 28 years; he retired on April 30, 2013. He received a Captain's Chair for the work that he did at Bard, becoming the first Muslim chaplain to be hired by a university, leading for other Muslim chaplains to be hired throughout the country. Muhammad retired from Bard College after working there for 17 years. Muhammad retired as the imam of the Masjid that he helped to build in Newburgh, New York, after being the senior imam there for 26 years. Muhammad has since moved to Raleigh, North Carolina, where he is now an associate imam to Imam Oliver Mohammed at the As-Salaam Islamic Center in Raleigh, North Carolina.

== Controversy ==
Muhammad drew national attention when four ex-convicts who had been attending his mosque were arrested in the 2009 New York City bomb plot, a plan, stopped by the FBI, to shoot down military planes at an Air National Guard base in Newburgh and blow up two synagogues in the Riverdale neighborhood of New York City. During the trial of Newburgh 4 it was not mentioned that they were members of the Masjid in Newburgh. What did come out is that they met the informant and planned their acts at the house the informant rented. The congregants had discussed the fact that a man who regularly attended the mosque appeared to be recruiting members for violent Jihad (this man turned out to be the FBI's planted informant.) However, no member of the large congregation made any attempt to report the man they believed to be a jihadi to the authorities.

The imam, calling the failure on his part and the part of the congregation to report the talk of jihad a "mistake", justified the failure by saying “but how are we going to report the government agent to the government?” Muhammad did not know the man was an informant until after the would-be terrorists were arrested. Although no one at the Masjid knew for certain, the members were told to stay away from the informant. Had they (Newburgh 4) been members, they would have known that the informant was a suspect.

He published Bridging the Divide Between Immigrant and African-American Muslims by Utilizing the Concept of Tawheed as the Catalyst (2011).
