= Masjid King Khalid =

Mosque in Shaw University, Raleigh, North Carolina, USA

Islamic Association of Raleigh

Religion
- Affiliation: Islam

Location
- Location: 130 Martin Luther King Jr. Blvd Raleigh, NC 27601
- State: North Carolina
- Country: United States
- Interactive map of Islamic Association of Raleigh
- Coordinates: 35.768894°N 78.637412°W

Architecture
- Type: Mosque
- Established: 1983

Website
- masjidkingkhalid.org

The Masjid King Khalid (or the Mosque of the Late King Khalid bin Abdul-Aziz Al-Saud) is a mosque located in downtown Raleigh, North Carolina in the Shaw University International Studies Center.

== History ==
In 1983, the International Studies Center (formerly International and Islamic Studies Center) was built on Shaw University Campus, a private Baptist University. Its construction was funded by a $1 million grant from King Khalid of Saudi Arabia, and established the mosque (then called the Jamaa'ah At Taqwa Mosque) as a part of this building on the second floor. The gift was arranged by the late Urabi Mustafa, a Palestinian professor who founded the International Studies Center.

In 2002, Shaw University had plans to close the mosque, resulting in protests.

In March 2020, Shaw University closed access to the mosque stating the reason was a response to the COVID-19 pandemic. The mosque remained closed, despite the Thomas J. Boyd Chapel being open, which led to several months of protesting and discussions to reopen took place starting January 2023. This led to a decision in August 2023 to temporarily reopen the mosque to the public under a "Memorandum of Understanding" until August 2026.

== Shooting ==
On 23 April 2024, 74-year old Kamal Rasool Abdal-Rafi was arrested by the Raleigh Police Department after firing a gun at another man regarding a dispute regarding walking a dog close to the building. Shots took place in the building which houses the King Khalid Mosque on the second floor. No injuries were reported, and classes were cancelled for the day.

== See also ==
- List of mosques in the United States
