= List of mosques in the United States =

This is a listing of notable mosques in the United States (Arabic: Masjid, Spanish: Mezquita), including Islamic places of worship that do not qualify as traditional mosques, sorted in alphabetical order by state.

== History of mosques in the United States ==
Number of mosques per million residents in each U.S. state and the District of Columbia as of 2020

A mosque, called "masjid" in Arabic, is defined as any place where Muslims pray facing Mecca, not necessarily a building. By that meaning, there were mosques in the United States by 1731 or earlier. Job ben Solomon (1701–1773), an African-American Muslim kidnapped into slavery, was documented by his slave narrative memoir to have prayed in the forest of Kent Island, Maryland, where he was brought during 1731–33.

Some sources assert that what is likely the first American mosque building was a mosque in Biddeford, Maine that was founded in 1915 by Albanian Muslims. A Muslim cemetery still existed there in 1996.

However, the first purpose-built mosque building was most likely the Highland Park Mosque in Detroit, Michigan, which opened in 1921. The mosque was located near the famous Highland Park Ford Plant, which employed "hundreds of Arab American men". This mosque, which included Sunni, Shia and Ahmadi Muslims, was funded by Muhammad Karoub, a real estate developer.

The earliest mosque of the Ahmadiyya Muslims Community is the Al-Sadiq Mosque, a two story building purchased by Mufti Muhammad Sadiq in 1922 in the Bronzeville neighborhood of Chicago, the original building was torn down and a purpose built mosque was constructed at the site in the 1990s. However, the first "purpose-built" mosque, the Mother Mosque of America, was built in 1934 in Cedar Rapids, Iowa.

In 1994, the Islamic Center of Yuba City, in California, was destroyed by a fire set in a hate-crime, the first mosque destroyed by a hate crime in U.S. history. It had just been completed at the cost of $1.8 million plus sweat equity of the Muslims of its rural community, including descendants of Pakistan who immigrated to the area c. 1902. Its story, including its rebuilding, is told in David Washburn's 2012 documentary An American Mosque.

=== Growth in the 21st century ===
Estimated proportion of Muslim Americans in each U.S. state, the District of Columbia, and Puerto Rico as of the 2020 U.S. Religion Census

It has been estimated that there were somewhat more than 100 mosques in the U.S. in 1970, but immigration of more than a million Muslims since then led to hundreds more being built. By 2000, there were 1,209 U.S. mosques, which rose to 2,106 in 2010, an increase of 74%. Also, the number of mosques in America has grown to 2,769 in 2020.

A 2011 study, The American Mosque 2011, sponsored by the Hartford Institute for Religion Research, the Association of Statisticians of American Religious Bodies, as well as the nation's largest Islamic civic and religious groups, including the Islamic Society of North America and the Council on American-Islamic Relations, found that the U.S. states with the most mosques were New York with 257, California with 246, and Texas with 166.

Since 2014, there has been a building boom for mosques.

== Notable individual mosques ==
Name	Image	Location	State	Year	Group	Notes
Homewood Masjid		Homewood	Alabama	1996		Established in a former segregated high school for African American students. A dedicated mosque, community center, and private PK-12 Islamic school.
Islamic Community Center of Anchorage Alaska		Anchorage	Alaska	2010	Sunni	First masjid and Islamic school in Alaska.
Islamic Community Center of Phoenix		Phoenix	Arizona	1982	Sunni	
Islamic Center of Tucson		Tucson	Arizona	1991	Sunni	
Tucson Yousef Mosque		Tucson	Arizona		Ahmadiyya	
Islamic Center of Little Rock		Little Rock	Arkansas	1996		First purpose built mosque in Little Rock. A new larger mosque, community center, and Islamic school are currently under construction 6.2 mi (10.0 km) northwest of the original mosque.
Baitul Hameed		Chino	California	1989	Ahmadiyya	Largest Ahmadiyya mosque in the western United States with a floor space of 19,000 square feet (1,800 m^{2}).
Islamic Center of San Diego		San Diego	California	1989		Largest mosque in San Diego County, California.
Islamic Center of San Francisco		San Francisco	California	1959		Oldest mosque in the San Francisco Bay Area and the second oldest mosque in California.
King Fahad Mosque		Culver City	California	1998	Sunni	
Islamic Center of Orange County		Garden Grove	California	1976	Sunni	Asserted to be one of the largest Muslim centers in the Western Hemisphere, with almost 7,000 worshipers.
Islamic Center of Irvine		Irvine	California	2004	Sunni	
Islamic Center of Southern California		Los Angeles	California	1970s	Non-denominational	The congregation was founded in 1952. The current mosque dates to the late 1970s. One of the largest mosques in the United States.
Islamic Cultural Center of Northern California		Oakland	California	1995	Non-denominational	Occupies a former Masonic temple. Founded by Shia Iranians but is open to Muslims of any denomination.
Masjid Annur Islamic Center		Sacramento	California	1982	Sunni	Largest mosque in Greater Sacramento. The organization moved into a larger property in 1994.
SALAM Islamic Center		Sacramento	California	2010		Established in a residential building and a pair of trailers in 1987. A dedicated mosque, community center, and Islamic school were constructed on the site between 2001 and 2010.
Muslim Mosque Association		Sacramento	California	1947		Oldest mosque in the western United States. Established in a residential building in 1947. Features a minaret.
Muslim community of Folsom (MCF)		Folsom	California	2011		Relatively new community of Muslims living in Folsom. Moved to the new location in April 2026, occupying a former office building.
Masjid Ar-Ribat al-Islami		San Diego	California		Sunni	
Islamic Center of Yuba City		Yuba City	California	1994		Completed in 1994 at cost of $1.8 million. It was then burnt by arson, in the first hate-crime destroying a mosque in the United States. The case received little attention at the time, but is subject of 2015 documentary An American Mosque produced by David Washburn.
Women’s Mosque of America		Los Angeles	California	2015	Non-denominational	First women-led Muslim house of worship. Offers monthly khutbas (sermons) to women and children (including boys 12 and under) of any Islamic denomination.
Islamic Center of Greater Hartford		Hartford and Berlin	Connecticut			Its president, Dr. M. Reza Mansoor is a Hartford Hospital cardiologist and "a long-time Trustee of the Hartford Seminary, the country's oldest center for the study of Islam and Christian-Muslim relations". Berlin, CT, new mosque is also part of IAGH. Mansoor was also founding president of the Muslim Coalition of Connecticut.
Masjid An-Noor, Bridgeport, a.k.a. Bridgeport Islamic Society-Masjid An-Noor		Bridgeport	Connecticut			Its building purchased in 1991 was formerly a bank. As the largest mosque in Bridgeport area, it was subject of questions in 2010 regarding any possible association of Faisal Shahzad, the May 1, 2010 Times Square bomber who lived in Bridgeport). Demonstrators from as far away as Texas confronted the mosque in protests in August 2010.
Bridgeport Islamic Community Center		Bridgeport	Connecticut	2017		The mosque occupies a former congregational church. Includes a community center and educational facilities.
Madina Masjid		Windsor	Connecticut	1993		
Assalam Center		Boca Raton	Florida			
Masjid Al-Ansar in Miami		Liberty City	Florida	1965 Founded; Incorporated 1975	Sunni	First Historical Mosque / Masjid In All of South Florida
Atlanta Masjid of Al-Islam		Atlanta	Georgia			Established when Elijah Muhammad purchased a property on Bankhead Hwy. Later moved to its present location.
Al-Farooq Masjid		Atlanta	Georgia	1980		The Al-Farooq Masjid was established in 1980 as The Atlanta Mosque, a nonprofit, non-political, religious organization. Later due to a name conflict with another organization, its name was changed to Al-Farooq Masjid of Atlanta.
Masjid Al-Muminun		Atlanta	Georgia			
Islamic Community Center of Augusta		Augusta	Georgia	2012	Sunni	
Masjid Al-Quba		Buford	Georgia	2010	Sunni	Established first Masjid in vicinity of Mall of Georgia area.
An-Noor Mosque		Mangilao	Guam	2000		First mosque established in Guam.
Honolulu Mosque		Honolulu, Oahu	Hawaii			Established by the Muslim Association of Hawaii.
Mosque Foundation		Bridgeview	Illinois	1980		
Islamic Community Center of Des Plaines		Des Plaines	Illinois	1998		
Mosque Maryam		Chicago	Illinois	1972	Nation of Islam	Also known as Muslim Temple No. 2. Originally a Greek Orthodox church, purchased in 1972 by the Nation of Islam. Headquarters of the Nation of Islam and of Louis Farrakhan.
Baitul Jamay		Glen Ellyn	Illinois			
Al-Sadiq Mosque		Bronzeville neighborhood, Chicago	Illinois	1922	Ahmadiyya	Asserted to be the oldest extant mosque in the United States.
Islamic Foundation		Villa Park	Illinois	1974		
Islamic Foundation North		Libertyville	Illinois	2004		
Masjid Darussalam		Lombard	Illinois	2013	Sunni	
Muslim Community Center		Chicago	Illinois	1969		
Muslim Association of Greater Rockford		Rockford	Illinois	1984		
Masjid Al-Huda		Schaumburg	Illinois	1992		
Masjid Noor ul-Islam, Burmese Muslim Education and Community Center		Fort Wayne	Indiana	2015		The first masjid built by the Burmese Muslim community outside their nation. BMECC website
Darul Arqum Islamic Centre		Ames	Iowa			Darul Arqum Islamic Centre website
Mother Mosque of America		Cedar Rapids	Iowa	1934		
Masjid Omar Bin Khattab		Harvey	Louisiana			
An Nur Foundation		White Marsh	Maryland	1995		
Baitur Rahman		Silver Spring	Maryland	1994	Ahmadiyya	
Baitus Samad	Baitus Samad	Baltimore	Maryland	2017	Ahmadiyya	
Diyanet Center of America	DCA mosque at dusk	Lanham	Maryland	1993	Sunni	Mosque complex built with support from the Turkish government.
Imam Mahdi Islamic Education Center of Baltimore		Parkville	Maryland	2003		
Islamic Society of Western Maryland		Hagerstown	Maryland	1994		
Islamic Society of Baltimore		Catonsville	Maryland	1969		Visited by former US president Barack Obama in 2016.
Dar Al-Taqwa Mosque		Ellicott City	Maryland			
Allston Congregational Church		Boston	Massachusetts	2000	Sunni	A mosque meets in former Congregational church.
Islamic Center of Boston (Wayland) (ICB Wayland)		Wayland	Massachusetts	1979		
Islamic Society of Boston		Cambridge	Massachusetts	1981		
Islamic Society of Greater Lowell		Chelmsford	Massachusetts	1993		
Quincy Mosque		Quincy	Massachusetts	1963		
Sharon Mosque		Sharon	Massachusetts	1993		Established by Lebanese American immigrants.
Worcester Islamic Center		Worcester	Massachusetts	2005		
Al-Islah Mosque		Hamtramck	Michigan	2000	Sunni	Established by Bangladeshi American immigrants.
Dearborn Mosque		Dearborn	Michigan	1937	Sunni	
First Albanian Bektashi Tekke in America		Taylor, Michigan	Michigan	1954	Shia (Bektashi Sufi)	
Islamic Center and Mosque of Grand Rapids		Grand Rapids	Michigan	1986	Sufism	
Islamic Center of America		Dearborn	Michigan	2005	Shia	Largest mosque in the United States.
Muslim Temple No. 1		Detroit	Michigan	1931	Nation of Islam	First mosque of the Nation of Islam.
Islamic Center of Mississippi-Starkville		Starkville	Mississippi			
Daar-ul-Islam		Ballwin	Missouri	1995	Sunni	One of two mosques of the Islamic Foundation of Greater St. Louis.
Islamic Center of Central Missouri		Columbia	Missouri	1983		First Islamic center established in Missouri.
Masjid Bilal		St. Louis	Missouri	1965 (Founded); 1974 (Incorporated)	Sunni	One of two mosques of the Islamic Foundation of Greater St. Louis.
St. Louis Islamic Center		St. Louis	Missouri	2010		A Bosnian mosque.
American Muslim Institute		Omaha	Nebraska	2017	Non-denominational	
Islamic Center of Omaha		Omaha	Nebraska		Non-denominational	
Masjid As-Sabur (As-Sabur Mosque)		Las Vegas	Nevada	1975	Sunni	
Masjid Ibrahim		Las Vegas	Nevada	2015		First mosque in North America whose construction was funded entirely by one woman (Sharaf Haseebullah)
Islamic Center of Passaic County		Paterson	New Jersey	1990		One of the largest Muslim communities in New Jersey, in South Paterson which is the largest Muslim community in the United States.
The Muslim Center of Greater Princeton		Princeton, New Jersey	New Jersey	1990s		
Islamic Society of Central New Jersey		South Brunswick, New Jersey	New Jersey	1970		Includes a K-12 school, Mosque, and facilities for weddings and funerals
Muslim Center of Middlesex County		Piscataway	New Jersey	1997		
Dar al-Islam		near Abiquiú	New Mexico	1979		
Islamic Awareness Center		Binghamton	New York	2001		Also known as Masjid Al-Tahweed.
Islamic Association of Long Island		Selden	New York	1974		Also known as the Selden Masjid.
Islamic Society of Central New York		Syracuse	New York	1981	Sunni	A mosque and community center.
Masjid Al-Mamoor		Jamaica	New York	1976		Also known as the Jamaica Muslim Center, includes a Mosque, a school, a place for religious gathering, and eating facilities, and is one of the largest multi-purpose Muslim establishments in the U.S. Located in a Bangladeshi-American neighborhood.
Masjid Hamza		Valley Stream	New York	1990s		
Mid-Hudson Islamic Association		Wappingers Falls	New York	1990		Also known as Masjid Al-Noor (Arabic: مسجد النور)
Masjid Malcolm Shabazz		New York City	New York	1946 (Original); 1960s (Current)	Sunni	Formerly known as Mosque No. 7 where Malcolm X preached in a storefront until he split from Elijah Muhammad and left the Nation of Islam in 1964. Destroyed in a bombing in 1965, after Malcolm X's assassination. Successor to the Sunni Muslim mosque that was named Muslim Mosque, Inc., which was started by Malcolm X after Malcolm X split from Elijah Muhammad in 1964. The mosque is located at 102 West 116th Street.
Hazrati Abu Bakr Siddique		New York City	New York	1986		
Masjid al-Ikhlas		Newburgh	New York	1992		
Islamic Cultural Center of New York		New York City	New York	1991		Also known as "96th Street Mosque".
Park51		New York City	New York	2011	Non-denominational	Proposed mosque, also known as the "Ground Zero mosque", a plan that became subject of controversy in 2010. Currently a museum, not a mosque, is planned. But in September 2011, a temporary 4,000-square-foot (370 m^{2}) Islamic center opened in renovated space at the site.
Beit El-Maqdis Islamic Center		New York City	New York			
Noor Islamic Cultural Center		Columbus	Ohio	2006		
Imam Khoei Islamic Center (New York)		New York City	New York (state)	1988		Islamic center; charity institution; One of the largest Shia Islamic centers in America
Masjid King Khalid		Raleigh	North Carolina	1982		Masjid King Khalid was the first and only Masjid in the US that was built from a donation from the Kingdom of Saudi Arabia to a private baptist University.
Islamic Association of Raleigh - IAR Masjid		Raleigh	North Carolina	1999		
Ar-Razzaq Islamic Center		Durham	North Carolina	1958		First Mosque established in North Carolina.
Assyrian Muslim Cemetery mosque		Mountrail County	North Dakota	1929, rebuilt 2004		The original mosque at the site was built in 1929 by immigrants from what is now Lebanon and Syria. A modest replacement mosque was built in 2005, although it was built for historical purposes and is rarely used.
Islamic Society of Greater Dayton		Josie Street, Dayton	Ohio	1985	Sunni	
Islamic Society of Greater Toledo		Toledo	Ohio	1983		
Islamic Association of Cincinnati		Cincinnati	Ohio	1970		Community members donated their funds and skills to design and build a new facility. The new mosque officially opened in 2003.
Toledo Masjid of Al-Islam		Toledo	Ohio	1953		Building built by the Syrian Lebanese immigrants in 1953. First Masjid (Mosque) built from the ground up in the State of Ohio and City of Toledo. Formerly the Islamic Center of Greater Toledo. Purchased in 2010 by Toledo Masjid of Al-Islam. Once called The American Muslim Mission.
Islamic Society of Tulsa		Tulsa	Oklahoma			
Bilal Masjid		Beaverton	Oregon	1987	Sunni	.
Islamic Center of Portland		Portland	Oregon	1979	Sunni	Also known by Masjid As-Saber. Largest Mosque located in Oregon.
Portland Rizwan Mosque		Portland	Oregon	1979	Ahmadiyya	
Islamic Education Center of Pennsylvania		Allentown	Pennsylvania	2005		Also known as Jesus Son of Mary Mosque (Masjid Eisa bin Maryam)
Islamic Center of Pittsburgh		Pittsburgh	Pennsylvania	1989		Largest mosque in Pittsburgh, with 600–750 attendees at Friday prayers
Masjid Al-Jamia of Philadelphia		Philadelphia	Pennsylvania	1988	Sunni	Founded in 1988, originally by Muslim students from the University of Pennsylvania; now independent; located in the building of the former Commodore Theatre, a cinema built in the Moorish (Spanish colonial) architectural style in 1928
Mosque of Shaikh M. R. Bawa Muhaiyaddeen		Philadelphia	Pennsylvania	1984		Established by the Bawa Muhaiyaddeen Fellowship, which honors the Sufi teachings of Bawa Muhaiyaddeen.
Masjid Muquil bin Haadee		Philadelphia	Pennsylvania		Sunni	
Centro Islamico de Puerto Rico		San Juan	Puerto Rico	1981		First mosque established in Puerto Rico. The mosque has a capacity of 200 men and 40 women and is located next to the University of Puerto Rico, Río Piedras Campus.
Masjid Vega Alta		Vega Alta	Puerto Rico	1992		Largest mosque in Puerto Rico, with a capacity of 1,200 men and 120 women.
Masjid Montehiedra		San Juan	Puerto Rico	2007		The mosque has a capacity of 400 men and 50 women. Features an Islamic weekend school.
Al-Islam Mosque		North Smithfield	Rhode Island			
Islamic Center of Murfreesboro		Murfreesboro	Tennessee	2012	Sunni	
Al-Noor		Houston	Texas	1987	Sunni	
Baitus Samee Mosque		Houston	Texas	2002	Ahmadiyya	Visited by Mirza Masroor Ahmad in 2018.
East Plano Islamic Center (EPIC Masjid)		Plano	Texas	2015	Sunni	
Islamic Association of North Texas		Richardson, Texas	Texas	1969	Sunni	
Islamic Center of Greater Austin		Austin	Texas	1977	Sunni	
Islamic Center of Irving		Irving	Texas	1991	Sunni	One of the largest mosques in the United States established in 1991 with 3,000 weekly worshippers.
Islamic Society of Denton		Denton	Texas	1981	Sunni	The Islamic Society of Denton (ISD) was built, primarily, by residents and students attending both the University of North Texas and Texas Woman's University. ISD opened in 15 August 1981, making it the first Masjid built in Texas.
Utah Islamic Center		West Jordan	Utah	2007	Sunni	The largest Islamic Community Center in Utah.
Nur Mosque		Charlotte Amalie	Virgin Islands	1978		First mosque established in the U.S. Virgin Islands.
Dar Al-Hijrah Islamic Center (English: Land of Migration Islamic Center)		Seven Corners area of unincorporated Fairfax County, Virginia	Virginia	1991		
All Dulles Area Muslim Society		Sterling, Virginia	Virginia	1983		
Islamic Center of Washington			Washington, D.C.	1957		
Fazl Mosque		Washington, D.C.	Washington, D.C.	1950	Ahmadiyya	Also known as the American Fazl Mosque. Served as the American headquarters of the Ahmaddiya movement in the United States until 1994.
Islamic Society of Northern Wisconsin		Altoona	Wisconsin	1991		Abbreviated as ISNW and also known as Altoona Masjid.

== See also ==
- Islam in the United States
- Lists of mosques in North America
- Lists of mosques (worldwide)
- List of the oldest mosques in the world
- Religious buildings and structures in the United States
