= Masjid As-Sabur =

Mosque in the United States

Coordinates: 36°10′48″N 115°9′4.5″W

Masjid As-Sabur (As-Sabur Mosque) is the oldest mosque, and the pioneering Muslim organization, in the city of Las Vegas, Nevada.

The history of the mosque dates back to the early 1970s tracing its roots to the Nation of Islam. In 1975 Masjid As-Sabur, then named Masjid Muhammad, made the transition to mainstream Islam under the national leadership of Imam Warith Deen Muhammad. The physical and administrative precincts of Masjid As-Sabur consist of the Mosque, Fajr al-Islam School, a community health clinic, and a number of committees such as Al-Ma'un (Neighborly Needs). The Masjid has established itself as a leading Islamic institution and community outreach center in the state of Nevada.

Among notable attendees of the mosque have been former heavyweight boxing champions Muhammad Ali and Mike Tyson, as well as Laila Ali (daughter of the boxer, Muhammad Ali).

== Imams ==
- Fateen Seifullah (1999–present)
- Luqman Abdus-Salam (1996–1999)
- Mujahid Ramadan (1984–1996)
- Muhammad Abdullah (1975–1984)

== Highlights of Certain Activities ==
- Masjid As-Sabur performs Islamic marriages, organizes educational programs and five daily ritual prayer services. The Masjid regularly holds Friday Jumu'ah prayer services at 1:00 PM.
- Through the efforts of its Social Committee, Al-Ma'un, the Masjid has been recognized nationwide as a humanitarian organization for aiding the victims of the Hurricane Katrina disaster in New Orleans.
- Thanks to the partnership of the University of Nevada-Las Vegas, the Masjid As-Sabur has also established a community Health Clinic.
- With the cooperation of Islamic Relief, the Masjid carried out Humanitarian Day services in 2005 and 2006 which provided food to the homeless.
- Al-Ma'un has conducted a community feeding program for several years and recently launched a neighborhood awareness center to provide free health care to needy community members.
- Along with its other services and activities Masjid As-Sabur is known for its innovative learning program at the burgeoning Fajr al-Islam school.
- In order to improve the lives of the people throughout the United States, Masjid As-Sabur has also established partnerships and initiatives with a wide number of Islamic, academic, and humanitarian organizations in the State such as the University of Nevada-Las Vegas.

== See also ==
- List of mosques in the United States
