= Mosque of Mar del Plata =

Mosque in Buenos Aires, Argentina

- Mezquita Sunita de Mar del Plata
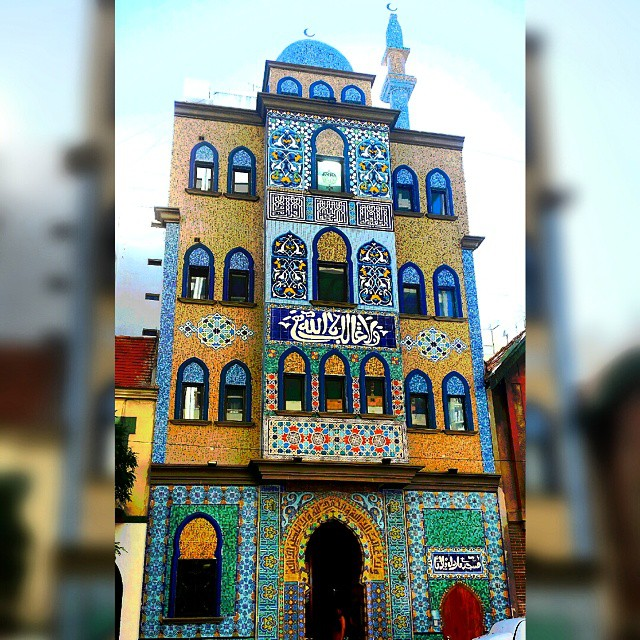

Religion
- Affiliation: Sunni Islam
- Region: Buenos Aires Province
- Ecclesiastical or organizational status: Mosque
- Status: Active

Location
- Location: Mar del Plata, Buenos Aires Province, Argentina

Architecture
- Architect: Germán Paulo
- Completed: 2014

Specifications
- Dome: 1
- Minaret: 1

Mosque of Mar del Plata (Spanish: Mezquita Sunita de Mar del Plata) is a Sunni Islamic mosque located in the downtown area of Mar del Plata, Argentina. It is recognized as the first Sunni mosque established in the city.

== History ==
The mosque was completed in 2014 and emerged from fundraising efforts supported by Muslim communities in Argentina and South Africa.

Local media describe it as the first Sunni mosque built in Mar del Plata, constructed "entirely in Bolívar, near Córdoba, in the heart of the city," and designed as a place dedicated to prayer and Quranic study.

The mosque's inauguration marked a significant addition to the city's religious diversity. It was noted publicly in 2014 by La Capital during its coverage of Mar del Plata's religious institutions.

== Architecture ==
The structure was designed by Argentine architect Germán Paulo and combines modern construction techniques with Islamic architectural symbolism.

The façade is decorated with thousands of handmade colored Venetian tiles forming geometric and arabesque motifs that distinguish it from surrounding buildings. The building includes:

- A single minaret
- A dome crowning the upper floor
- A Moorish-style portal and handcrafted woodwork
- A prayer hall carpeted with motifs resembling individual prayer rugs
- A mihrab precisely oriented toward Mecca
- Ablution facilities for ritual washing
- A designated room for Islamic funeral rituals

== See also ==
- Palacio Arabe
- Islam in Argentina
- List of mosques in Argentina
