= Tucson Mosque =

Islamic center in Pima County, Arizona

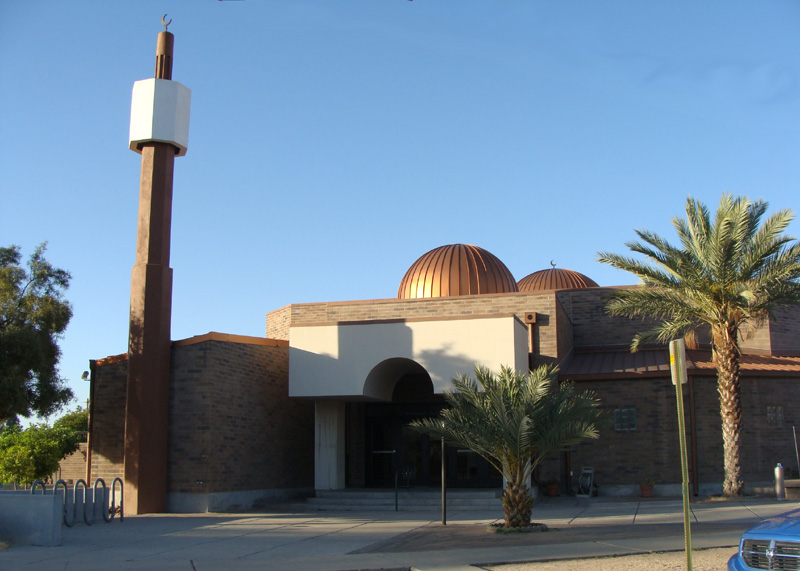

- Location in Arizona

Religion
- Affiliation: Islam
- Ecclesiastical or organizational status: Mosque
- Status: Active

Location
- Location: 901 E 1st St, Tucson, Arizona 85719
- Country: United States
- Interactive map of Tucson Mosque
- Coordinates: 32°14′05″N 110°57′27″W

Architecture
- Type: Mosque architecture
- Established: 1960s
- Completed: 1991

Specifications
- Dome: 1
- Minaret: 1

Website
- ictucson.org

The Tucson Mosque, officially known as the Islamic Center of Tucson, abbreviated as ICT, is a mosque and Islamic community center in Tucson, Arizona. Situated near the University of Arizona, the society serves as both a prayer space and a community center. It caters to all Muslims of southern Arizona and the larger community as a whole. It was completed in 1991 and has a single minaret and dome. It holds the 5 daily prayers as well as Jumu'ah on Fridays.

== History ==
The history of the ICT community traces its roots back to university students that attended the University of Arizona in the 1960s. Since then, it has grown to encompass thousands of community members from converts to multi-generational families to young upstarts and more. The center serves as a place of worship, a place of gathering, a hub for community events, interfaith dialogue, and a cultural resource.

== See also ==
- Islam in the United States
- List of mosques in the United States
