= Islamic Foundation =

Mosque in Illinois, United States

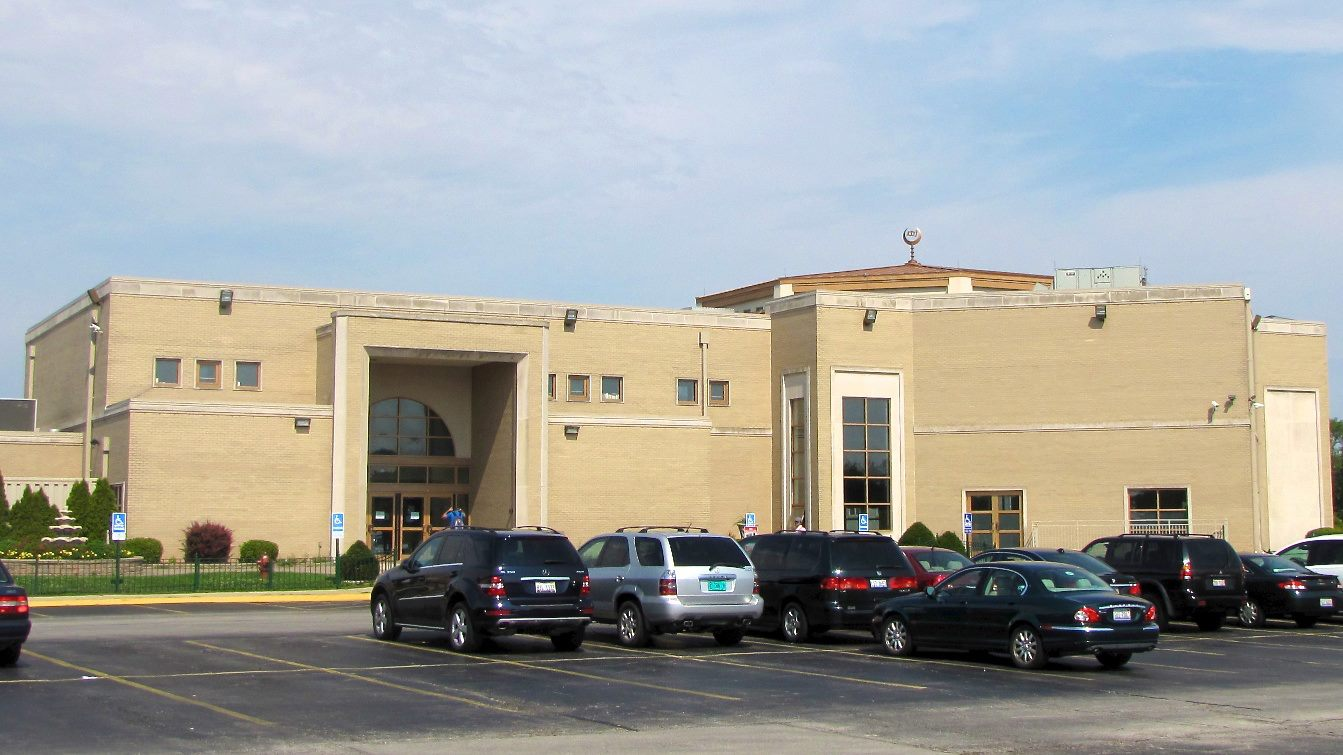

- Location in Illinois

Religion
- Affiliation: Islam
- Ecclesiastical or organizational status: non-profit religious organization

Location
- Location: S Addison Ave, Villa Park, Illinois 60181
- Interactive map of Islamic Foundation
- Coordinates: 41.867913°N 87.985876°W

Architecture
- Type: Mosque
- Completed: original: 1974 expansion: 1998

Specifications
- Dome: 1
- Minaret: 0

Website
- www.islamicfoundation.org

Islamic Foundation is a mosque located in Villa Park, Illinois. It was built in 1974 and was one of the largest mosques in the United States upon its completion. The mosque is connected to Islamic Foundation School, with which it is affiliated.

== History ==
The organization that runs the mosque was founded in 1974, when it was registered with the State of Illinois as a non-profit organization. Through the organization, Islamic Foundation School would be established in 1988. By 1995, the local community had raised enough money to begin the construction of a new full mosque as part of the school. The mosque was completed in 1998 at a cost of $3.6 million.

== See also ==
- Islam in the United States
- Islamic Architecture
- List of mosques in the United States
