= Islamic Association of Cincinnati =

Islamic organization based in Cincinnati, Ohio

- Location within Ohio

Religion
- Affiliation: Islam
- Region: Cincinnati metropolitan area

Location
- Location: 8092 Plantation Dr
- Municipality: West Chester
- State: Ohio
- Country: United States
- Interactive map of Islamic Association of Cincinnati
- Coordinates: 39.348°N 84.383°W

Architecture
- Architect: Ramzi Mahallawi
- Style: Syrian & Moorish Fusion

Website
- icgc.us cliftonmosque.org

The Islamic Association of Cincinnati (IAC) is an Islamic organization serving the Cincinnati metropolitan area in Ohio. Founded in 1970, it operates the Islamic Center of Greater Cincinnati and the Clifton Mosque, providing religious and educational services to the local Muslim community.

== History ==
Muslims around Cincinnati first started trying to centrally organize in the early 1960s. They would meet for Friday prayer at the University of Cincinnati YMCA. In 1968 a local family purchased a home at 2515 Fairview Avenue converting it for use as a Mosque. The IAC was then officially established in 1970. Throughout the 1970s and 1980s immigration to the area increased and with it saw the rise of Muslims as well. The IAC soon outgrew the mosque and established a new one in 1982 at 3668 Clifton Avenue where the Clifton Mosque still stands to this day. In the 1990s growth continued and in 1988 the IAC purchased 18 acres of land in West Chester, Ohio where they would build the Islamic Center of Greater Cincinnati (ICGC). The project was spearheaded by local Syrian immigrant and businessman Ahmad Samawi. The ICGC was opened on 9 November 1995 at a cost of 5 million USDand remains the principle mosque for the IAC to this day. In August 2001, the 42,500-square foot Islamic private school El-Sewedy International Academy of Cincinnati school opened on the grounds of the Center.

== Architecture ==
The Islamic Center of Greater Cincinnati is a 14,000 square foot building designed by Egyptian architect Ramzi Mahallawi and built in a mix of 8th century Syrian and 12th century Moorish styles.
