= Islamic Center of Greater Toledo =

Society and Mosque in Toledo, Ohio

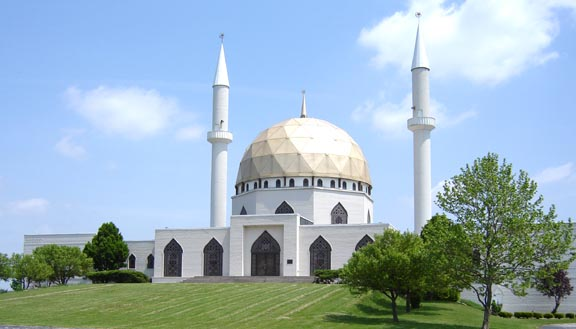
- The Islamic Center of Greater Toledo in 2007

- Location within Ohio

Religion
- Affiliation: Islam
- Region: Toledo metropolitan area
- Festival: International Festival

Location
- Location: 25877 Scheider Rd
- Municipality: Perrysburg
- State: Ohio
- Country: United States
- Interactive map of Islamic Center of Greater Toledo
- Coordinates: 41.528°N 83.618°W

Architecture
- Architect: Talat Itil
- Style: classic Islamic architecture

Website
- https://icgt.org/

The Islamic Center of Greater Toledo is an organization in the Toledo metropolitan area.

== History ==
Established in 1938 the Syrian American Moslem Society served as a predecessor to the current organization.

The society built their first mosque in Toledo, Ohio with construction starting in 1952 and ending in 1954. with this Mosque being the first in Ohio, and the third in the United States of America.

Toledo hosted the second International Moslem Convention of the Islamic Society of North America due to an invitation by the Islamic Society of Toledo.

The land for the current mosque in Perrysburg, Ohio was purchased in 1978. Astronomers from the University of Toledo were consulted to ensure the building was properly oriented to Mecca. Groundbreaking occurred in 1980, with construction lasting from September 1982 to 1983. On October 23, 1983, the official opening of the current Islamic center was held. At the time of opening it was called the largest traditional style Mosque in North America by The New York Times.

In 2001 the center appointed their first female president, who within the United States of America was also the first female president for Islamic center. Following the September 11 attacks the Mosque was shot at, leading to the local community forming a human protective wall around the Mosque, as well as local churches offering escorts to help make Muslims feel safe when out and about.

The aging polystyrene and concrete dome was replaced with newer gold plated aluminum geodesic dome in 2004.

In 2012 the mosque was attacked at night by an arsonist, with the fire being extinguished by the fire sprinkler system of the building.

Early in the COVID-19 pandemic, the center was lit blue to show support for health professionals.

== Architecture ==
The Mosque has featured a gold plated aluminum geodesic dome which measures is 65 feet (20 m), with a height of 30 feet (9.1 m). The dome is located between twin 135 feet (41 m) tall minarets. The mosque is noted for its use of stained glass.

== Services ==
The campus houses a private school, the Islamic School of Greater Toledo. The center also operates a food bank.

The center hosts an annual International Festival.
