= Lists of mosques in South America =

List of mosques in South America

This is a list of lists of mosques in South America, including mosques, Islamic centers, individual buildings, and congregations and administrative organizations, sorted by country in South America. (Note: Mosques in Central America can be found in the Lists of mosques in North America.)

== Argentina ==
Name	Images	Location	Year	Tradition	Notes
Centro Islámico Arabe de Mendoza		Mendoza	1926		
Asociación Cultural y Culto Pan Islámica		San Miguel de Tucumán	1929		
Asociación Unión Islámica Rosario		Rosario	1932		
At-Tauhid Mosque (Spanish: Mezquita At-Tauhid)		Floresta, Buenos Aires	1983	Shia	
Al Ahmad Mosque (Spanish: Mezquita Al Ahmad)		Buenos Aires	1985	Sunni	
Mezquita Islámica de Córdoba		Córdoba	1986		
King Fahd Islamic Cultural Center (Spanish: Centro Cultural Islam King Fahd)[es]		Buenos Aires	2000	Sunni	
Mezquita Sufi de la Patagonia		El Bolsón	2001	Sufi	
Mezquita de Mar del Plata		Mar del Plata	2014		
The Arab Palace					

== Bolivia ==
Name	Images	Location	Year	Remarks
As-Salam Mosque		La Paz		
Bolivian Islamic Center		Calle San Joaquin, Santa Cruz,		
Yebel An Nur Mosque				

== Brazil ==
Name	Image	City	Year (CE)	Remarks
Centro Islâmico do Amazonas		Manaus		
Islamic Cultural Center of Bahia		Salvador		
Centro Cultural Árabe-Muçulmano		Salvador		
Centro Islâmico do Ceará		Fortaleza		
Musala As-Salaf As-Saalih		Fortaleza		Friday prayers & Saturday Islamic Studies class only
Brasilia Islamic Centre Mosque (Centro Islâmico do Brasil)		Brasilia		
Mosque of Cuiabá		Cuiabá	1978	Founded in April 1972; open to tourists.
Mesquita de Belo Horizonte		Belo Horizonte		
Mosque of Curitiba (Mesquita Imam Ali ibn Abi Talib)		Curitiba	1972	Rua Kellers,383 – São Francisco
Mesquita Omar Ibn Al-Khatab (Mesquita Foz Do Iguaçu)		Foz do Iguaçu	1983	City near Iguaçu Falls.
Centro Islâmico Beneficente do Paraná		Curitiba		R. Hildebrando de Araújo, 729 - Jardim Botânico
Iman Ali Mosque		Ponta Grossa		R. do Rosário, 138 - Centro
Islamic Center of Recife		Recife		
Sociedade Beneficente Muçulmana		Rio de Janeiro		
Islamic Center of Natal		Natal		
Chui Mosque (Mesquita Chui)		Chui		Groundbreaking commenced in 2007. As of 2021, the mosque was open, yet incomplete.
Centro Islâmico de Porto Alegre		Porto Alegre		
Centro Islâmico de Florianópolis		Florianópolis		
Mesquita Brasil		São Paulo	1929	Oldest mosque in Brazil.
Mesquita (Musallah) Muhammad		São Paulo	2019	Av. Carlos de Campos 77
The Islamic Center of Brazil		São Paulo		
Masjid Abu Bakr Assiddik		São Paulo		
Mesquita Salah Ad-Din Al Ayubi		São Paulo		
Centro de Divulgacion do Islam da America Latina		São Paulo		
Masjid Carapicuiba (Mesquita Al-Firdaus)		São Paulo		
Masjid Hanzala		São Paulo		
Sociedade Beneficente Muçulmana		São Paulo		
Masjid Hamza (Mesquita Hz. Hamza)		São Paulo		
Liga Beneficente da Juventude Islâmica do Brasil		São Paulo		
Masjid Salah ed-Din al-Ayubi		São Paulo		
Sociedade Islâmica Brasileira		São Paulo		
Centro Islâmico de Campinas		Campinas		
Cemitério Islâmico De Guarulhos		Guarulhos		

== Chile ==
Name	Images	Location	Year	Remarks
As-Salam Mosque		Santiago	1989	
Mohammed VI Mosque		Coquimbo	2007	
Bilal Mosque		Iquique	1997	
Mezquita La Huayca		La Huayca		

== Colombia ==
Name	Images	Location	Year	Remarks
Mosque of Omar Ibn Al-Khattab		Maicao	1997	
Othman Ben Affan Mosque		Barranquilla	2005	
Abou Bakr Al-Siddiq Mosque		Bogotá	2012	
Mezquita de As-Salam Medellin		Medellin		
Mezquita de Muhammad		Cartagena		
Islamic Center Al-Qurtubi		Bogotá		
Ahlul Bayt Mosque		Bogotá		
Mezquita Abu Bakr		Cartagena		

== Paraguay ==
Name	Image	Location	Established	Tradition	Notes
Arab-Islamic Center of Paraguay					
Islamic Beneficial Cultural Center of Asunción					
Mezquita del Este		Ciudad del Este	2015		
Mezquita Del La Profeta Muhammed		Ciudad del Este	1999	SH	
Ibrahim Mosque		Ciudad del Este		S	
S = Sunni Islam; SH = Shia_Islam; A = Ahmadiyya; ND = Non-denominational

== Peru ==
Name	Images	Location	Year	Remarks
Bab al-Islam Mosque		Tacna	2000	
Mosque of Lima		Lima	1986	

== Suriname ==
Name	Images	Location	Year	Remarks
Mosque Keizerstraat		Paramaribo	1984	
		Wanica District	1906	First known mosque established in South America.
Nabawi Suriname Mosque		Paramaribo	1933	
Ahmadiyya Muslim Nasir Mosque		Paramaribo	1971	

== Uruguay ==
Name	Image	Location	Year	Remarks
Egyptian Center of Islamic Culture		Montevideo		
Islamic Center Uruguay				
Musallah Al Haazimi				

== Venezuela ==
Name	Images	Location	Year	Remarks
		Caracas	1968	First purpose-built mosque in Venezuela.
Mosque of Sheikh Ibrahim Al-Ibrahim		Caracas	1993	Second largest mosque in South America at 5,000 m^{2} (54,000 ft^{2}). Possesses the tallest minaret in the Americas at 113 m (371 ft) tall.
Punto Fijo Mosque		Punto Fijo, Falcón	2008	
Al-Rauda Mosque		Maracaibo, Zulia		
Islamic Association of the Palestine Mosque		El Limón, Aragua		
Honorable Association of the Jerusalem Mosque		Margarita, Nueva Esparta		
Honorable Association of the Omar ben al-Khattab Mosque		San Felipe		
Mezquita en el Tigre		Anzoátegui		

== See also ==
- Islam in American Continent
- Lists of mosques (worldwide)
- Lists of mosques in North America
- List of the oldest mosques in the world
