= Islam in the Dallas–Fort Worth metroplex =

American Muslims in Texas area

The Dallas–Fort Worth metroplex has one of the largest Muslim populations in the United States. Dallas-Fort Worth is home to sixty-two Sunni mosques and five Shia mosques. According to Abdel Rahman Murphy, a Chicago-born, Irving-based Islamic teacher and Muslim community leader, other U.S.-based Muslims now refer to Dallas as the "Medina of America". Not only is Dallas Masjid Al Islam the oldest Muslim community in the DFW area, it established the first mosque in the city of Dallas and established the first Muslim school in the DFW area. As of 2021, many major Muslim organizations and charities have headquarters or operations in DFW, mostly located in Richardson, Texas such as: ICNA Dallas, Muslim American Society, Muslim Legal Fund of America, Helping Hands for Relief & Development, Sabrina Memorial Foundation, Islamic Relief USA, CAIR-Texas, and MA’RUF. There are also several institutions of research and higher education such as: Qalam Institute (Carrollton), ISRA Foundation (Plano), Bayyina Academy (Euless), and The Islamic Seminary of America (Richardson).

Halal restaurants in Dallas Fort-Worth: There are a plethora of options across the DFW area for halal food restaurants. Afrah in Richardson, Plano Texas King, Dimassi’s, various locations, Board Bites in Plano, Jimmy’s Burger and Grill in Plano, Crescent Moon in Plano, Hadramout in Plano, Olive Burger in Plano, Thai Noodle Wave, various locations. These include Middle Eastern, South Asian, and East Asian, and American cuisines.

== History ==
Islam first came to Dallas through the Nation of Islam, whose members were sent by Elijah Muhammad during the 1950s, founding Temple #48 in Downtown Dallas. When Elijah Muhammad was succeeded by his son Wallace Deen Muhammad in 1975, the Dallas Temple #48 was reorganized as The Dallas Masjid Al-Islam. Dallas Masjid al Islam was the first and oldest Muslim community in Dallas area. It started the first Muslim school in Dallas and the first Mosque in the city. Meanwhile, international Muslims established the Islamic Association of North Texas in 1969. In 1977, the African American Muslims and the International Immigrant Muslims had the first combined Eid al-Fitr on Baghdad St. in a backyard in Grand Prairie, TX. In 1980, IANT was joined by Imam Yusuf Ziya Kavakçı. Throughout the next few decades, more Mosques were built. IANT established the longest running free health clinics of the Muslim community, followed by the East Plano Islamic Center and Valley Ranch Islamic Center later on. Eventually, Nouman Ali Khan moved to Dallas, followed by Omar Suleiman. This led to an increase of Muslim immigration to Dallas from other parts of America. There is also a growing number of Hispanic Muslims in Dallas.

== List of mosques ==
| Name of Mosque | Location |
|---|---|
| Islamic society of Arlington Texas (ISAT) | 1700 S Center St, Arlington, TX 76010 |
| ISRA Foundation | 930 W Parker Rd Suite 530, Plano, TX 75075 |
| Islamic Center of Quad Cities | 3620 State Hwy 121 STE 200, Plano, TX 75025 |
| Bayyinah Euless Musalla | 1701 W Euless Blvd, Euless, TX 76040 |
| East Plano Islamic Center | 1360 Star Court, Plano, TX 75074 |
| Grand Prairie Masjid | 802 Greenview Dr. Suite B, Grand Prairie, TX 75050 |
| Islamic Association of Allen | 909 Allen Central Dr, Allen, TX 75013 |
| Islamic Association of Carrollton | 1901 Kelly Blvd, Carrollton, TX 75006 |
| Islamic Association of Collin County | 6401 Independence Pkwy, Plano, TX 75023 |
| Islamic Center of Quad Cities | 3620 TX-121 #200, Plano, TX 75025 |
| Islamic Association of DeSoto | 616 Rayburn Dr, DeSoto, TX 75115 |
| DeSoto House of Peace - Mosque & Community Center | 531 W Belt Line Rd, DeSoto, TX 75115 |
| Islamic Association of Fort Worth | 6005 Chapman Road, Watauga, TX 76148 |
| Islamic Association of Lewisville & Flower Mound | 3430 Peters Colony Road in Flower Mound, TX 75022 |
| Islamic Association of Mesquite | 2419 Franklin Drive, Mesquite, TX 75150 |
| Islamic Association of Mid-Cities | 500 Cheek-Sparger Rd, Colleyville, TX 76034 |
| Islamic Association of North Texas | 840 Abrams Road, Richardson, TX |
| Islamic Association of Tarrant County | 4901 Diaz Ave, Fort Worth, TX 76107 |
| Islamic Association of The Colony | 5201 S Colony Blvd #535, The Colony, TX 75056 |
| Islamic Center of Coppell and Lewisville | 600 E Sandy Lake Rd, Coppell, TX 75019 |
| Islamic Center of Frisco | 11137 Frisco St, Frisco, TX 75033 |
| Islamic Center of Irving | 2555 Esters Rd, Irving, TX 75062 |
| Islamic Center of Southlake | 1280 N Carroll Ave, Southlake, TX 76092 |
| Islamic Association of Texas (Imam Abu Hanifa Masjid) | 132 N Glenville Dr, Richardson, TX 75081 |
| Islamic Society of Denton | 1105 Greenlee St, Denton, TX 76201 |
| Makkah Masjid | 3301 W Buckingham Rd, Garland, TX 75042 |
| Masjid Yaseen - Garland Branch | 1601 W. Campbell Road, Garland, TX 75044 |
| MAS Islamic Center of Dallas | 1515 Blake Dr, Richardson, TX 75081 |
| Mansfield Islamic Center | 6401 New York Ave # 135, Arlington, TX 76018 |
| Mckinney Islamic Association | 2940 Eldorado Pkwy, McKinney, TX 75070 |
| Rahmania Center | 329 E Polk St, Richardson, TX 75081 |
| Valley Ranch Islamic Center | 9940 Valley Ranch Pkwy W, Irving, TX 75063 |
| Islamic Center of MOMIN | 2945 Frankford Rd, Dallas, TX 75287 |
| IILM Shia Center | 2101 W Plano Pkwy, Plano, TX 75075 |
| City of Knowledge | 5000 Main St suite 228b, The Colony, TX 75056 |
| Institute of Quran and Ahlul Bayt (IQA) | 1112 Milam Way, Carrollton, TX 75006 |
| Imam Ali Islamic Center | 2330 Dalworth St, Grand Prairie, TX 75050 |
| Dallas Masjid of Al-Islam | 2604 S Harwood St, Dallas, TX 75215 |
| Madinah Masjid of Carrollton | 2180 Old Denton Rd, Carrollton, TX 75006 |
| Zia ul Quran Masjid | 2425 Carter Dr, Arlington, TX 76014 |
| Barkaat-ul-Quran | 555 W Airport Fwy #178, Irving, TX 75062 |
| Faizan-e-Madinah Wylie | 641 W Brown St, Wylie, TX 75098 |
| Masjid Al-Hedayah Academy | 8601 Randol Mill Rd, Fort Worth, TX 76120 |

== List of notable Islamic scholars and speakers ==
| Omar Suleiman | Irving |
| Yasir Qadhi | Plano |
| Nouman Ali Khan | Euless |

== Controversies ==
=== Holy Land Foundation (HLF) ===
The Holy Land Foundation (HLF) was the largest Islamic charity in the United States. Headquartered in Richardson, Texas, and run by Palestinian-Americans, it was originally known as Occupied Land Fund. In 2004, a federal grand jury in Dallas, Texas charged HLF and five former officers and employees with providing material support to Hamas and related offenses. The prosecution's theory was that HLF distributed charity through local zakat (charity) committees located in the West Bank that paid stipends to the families of Palestinian and Hamas which is resistance against the illegal occupation; that those zakat committees; provided support by distributing charity through committees. HLF helped Hamas build a grassroots support amongst the Palestinian people; these charity front organizations served a dual purpose of strengthening the families of those that are indigenous to the area and provide the otherwise obsolete support due to Israel's restrictions and bans, as well as controlling all their basic needs.

The government did not allege that HLF paid directly for suicide bombings, but instead that the foundation supported terrorism by sending more than $12 million to charitable groups, known as zakat or charity committees, which provide social goods and services. The prosecution said the committees were controlled by Hamas, and contributed to terrorism by helping Hamas spread its ideology, recruit supporters, and provide a front for laundering money and soliciting donations.

In 2009, the founders of the organization were given sentences of between 15 and 65 years in prison for "funnelling $12 million to Hamas." The trial has been criticised by some NGOs, including Human Rights Watch.
