= Housing segregation in the United States =

Denying races access to housing

In the United States, housing segregation is the practice of denying African Americans and other minority groups equal access to housing through the process of misinformation, denial of realty and financing services, and racial steering. Housing policy in the United States has influenced housing segregation trends throughout history. Key legislation includes the National Housing Act of 1934, the G.I. Bill, and the Fair Housing Act. Factors such as socioeconomic status, spatial assimilation, and immigration contribute to perpetuating housing segregation. The effects of housing segregation include relocation, unequal living standards, and poverty. However, there have been initiatives to combat housing segregation, such as the Section 8 housing program.

Racial residential segregation doubled from 1880 to 1940. Southern urban areas were the most segregated. Segregation was highly correlated with lynchings of African-Americans. Segregation lowered homeownership rates for both blacks and whites and boosted crime rates. Areas with housing segregation had worse health outcomes for both whites and blacks. Residential segregation accounts for a substantial share of the black-white gap in birth weight. Segregation reduced upward economic mobility.

White communities are more likely to have exclusionary zoning regulations (and whites are more likely to support those regulations). Strict land use regulations are an important driver of housing segregation along racial lines in the United States.

== Home ownership ==
Home ownership is a crucial means by which families can accumulate wealth. Over a period of time, homeowners accumulate home equity in their homes. In turn, this equity can contribute substantially to the wealth of homeowners. In summary, homeownership allows for the accumulation of home equity, a means of storing wealth, and provides families with insurance against poverty. Ibarra and Rodriguez state that home equity is 61% of the net worth of Hispanic homeowners, 38.5% of the net worth of White homeowners, and 63% of the net worth of African-American homeowners. Conley remarks that differences in rates of home ownership and housing value accrual may lead to lower net worth in the parental generation, which disadvantages the next. There are large disparities in homeownership rates by race. In 2017, the homeownership rate was 72.5% for non-Hispanic Whites, 46.1% for Hispanics, and 42.0% for Blacks.

The value of property has stifled during the history of the United States. Initially, when African Americans were still enslaved, they were forbidden from owning land and those that could were white Americans. As times passed, so did the access to property, allowing African Americans to purchase property within their financial needs. A prime example of how banks and organizations manipulate home ownership, is by offering predatory loans. These loans target lower income individuals, who are normally turned away from the Banks, and given lump sums on a ridiculous interest fee. These fees only provide two outcomes for individuals, either they default on their payments and lose their property or live out their lives in debt. This ranges to everyday items, such as automobiles and homes which are restricted to the individuals that need it the most.

== Home equity ==
There is a discrepancy in relation to race in terms of housing value. On average, the economic value of Black-owned units is 35% less than similar White-owned units. Thus, on average, Black-owned units sell for 35% less than similar White-owned units. Krivo and Kaufman state that while median home value of White Americans is at least $20,000 more than that of African Americans and Hispanics, these differences are not a result of group differences in length of residences because Asians have the most equity on their homes but have lived in them for the shortest average period. African American and Hispanic mortgage holders are 1.5 to 2.5 times more likely to pay 9% or more on interest. Krivo and Kaufman calculate that the African-American/White gap in mortgage interest rates is 0.39%, which translates to a difference of $5,749 on the median home loan payment of a 30-year mortgage of a $53,882 home. The Hispanic/White gap (0.17%) translates to Hispanics paying $3,441 more on a 30-year mortgage on the median valued Hispanic home loan of $80,000. The authors conclude that the extra money could have been reinvested into wealth accumulation.

Krivo and Kaufman also postulate that the types of mortgage loans minorities obtain contributes to the differences in home equity. FHA and VA loans make up one-third or more of primary loans for African Americans and Hispanics, while only 18% for White Americans and 16% for Asians. These loans require lower down payments and cost more than conventional mortgages, which contributes to a slower accumulation of equity. Asians and Hispanics have lower net equity on houses partly because they are youngest on average, but age has only a small effect on the Black-White gap in home equity. Previously owning a home can allow the homeowner to use money from selling the previous home to invest and increase the equity of later housing. Only 30% of African Americans in comparison to 60% of White Americas had previously owned a home. African-Americans, Asians, and Hispanics gain lower home equity returns in comparison to White Americans with increases in income and education.

== Residential segregation ==
Residential segregation can be defined as, "physical separation of the residential locations between two groups. In the United States, large discrepancies in poverty and affluence have become geographically and therefore racially concentrated. Much residential segregation resulted from the discriminatory lending practice of redlining, which delineated certain primarily minority neighborhoods as risky for investment or lending. This, in turn, created neighborhoods with concentrated, radical disinvestment. Most notably, this geographic concentration of affluence vs. poverty can be seen in the comparison between suburban and urban neighborhoods. The suburbs, which boast large tax bases and large investment, have traditionally been inhabited by primarily White populations, while the majority of urban inner city populations have traditionally been composed of racial minorities. Results from the last few censuses suggest that more inner-ring suburbs around cities also are becoming home to racial minorities as their populations grow and put pressure on the small neighborhoods that they are confined to. As of 2017, most residents of the United States live in "radicalized and economically segregated neighborhoods".

It is proposed that many white residents believe that people of color will threaten public goods and housing values and will therefore work to keep white communities homogeneous with more stringent land use regulations. If land use regulation is able to be used to solve collective action problems inherent to the production of public goods, it would be expected that communities with more stringent regulations would be more likely to maintain demographic exclusivity. From research, it is found that communities that were whiter in 1970 have maintained that demographic profile using land use restriction. Evidence demonstrates that white voters are more likely to support restricting development and more stringent land use to keep cities racially homogenous, maintaining "whiter" cities. This reveals how land use regulations produce further residential segregation in America.

=== Residential segregation in Detroit ===
Residential segregation was especially demonstrated during the post-WWI period in metro Detroit, as hundreds of thousands of people migrated to Detroit during the Great Migration due to its need for cheap labor in war industries and shipyards. Detroit's geographical location along waterways allowed it to become an industrial powerhouse with booming shipping and automobile industries. During this time, many blacks migrated from the Jim Crow South to look for new opportunities and work in Detroit, but were unfortunately met with deep-rooted racist ideologies and overall inequality even in this northern city. The institutional barriers in place within housing during the postwar period further marginalized African-Americans in Detroit and strengthened pre-existing ideas of racism and white supremacy. Because many white Detroiters viewed blacks as outsiders that ultimately would devalue their investments in housing and drastically alter their current lifestyles, they were reluctant to allow them to move into their neighborhoods. The Federal Housing Authority's redlining practices reinforced these calls for residential segregation as their policies refused the improvement of black neighborhoods, simply by denying mortgage loans or loans to purchase homes to combat crowding in these black neighborhoods. Blacks were shut out of the private real estate market, with many unable to purchase homes and bankers using federal appraisal policies that unfairly ruled black neighborhoods to be dangerous, risky investments, and were thus able to outright refuse loans to African-Americans.

Blacks ended up living in extremely run-down, crowded areas of the city like Black Bottom and Paradise Valley that were radically disinvested and therefore became blighted. These decrypt houses were very poorly maintained and thus had many maintenance issues including problems with running water, fires, and rat infestations – making them unsuitable places to live. Conversely, due to their white privilege and economic security, whites were able to flee the city to live in highly invested and wealthier suburbs on the outskirts of metro Detroit. Their neighborhoods were typically clean and had high housing values, a major source of pride and economic and social prosperity for white residents.

Due to housing policies implemented on both local and federal levels, black Detroiters were left with inadequate living conditions in racially segregated communities, as their white counterparts refused the integration of white and black neighborhoods. Detroit's history of racial segregation regarding residency has continued to have an exponential impact on the city, continuing until today. The structural obstacles that blacks faced upon migration to Detroit demonstrates the prevalence and strength of racism and white supremacy, with whites largely believing that they were superior and thus did not want their homes "devalued" and "corrupted" by blacks. The political climate of the postwar period and the residential segregation that blacks faced has played a large role in Detroit's contemporary urban crisis.

== History of housing discrimination ==
=== Legislation ===
==== The National Housing Act of 1934 ====
In 1934 the practice of redlining neighborhoods came into existence through the National Housing Act of 1934. This practice, also known as mortgage discrimination, began when the federal government and the newly formed Federal Housing Administration allowed the Home Owners' Loan Corporation to create "residential security maps", outlining the level of security for real-estate investments in 239 cities around the United States. On these maps, high-risk areas were outlined in red, high risk areas being considered highly populated areas of African Americans or other minority groups. Many minority neighborhoods were redlined in these maps, meaning that banks would deny all mortgage capital to people living within them. This contributed to the decay of many of these neighborhoods because the lack of loans for buying or making repairs on the homes made it difficult for these neighborhoods to attract and keep families. Many urban historians point to redlining as one of the main factors for urban disinvestment and the decline of central cities in the middle decades of the 20th century.

==== The Housing Act of 1937 ====
This piece of legislation occurred during the New Deal era and provided the basis for future public housing programs. This act allowed for the creation of around 160,000 units of public housing. Most of these units were made to alleviate the housing difficulties of the poor and working class suffering from the Great Depression. Additionally, this public housing program allowed for the Federal Housing Authority (FHA) to provide various monetary funds to local housing authorities to aid with the building and development of these units.

The first federal public housing projects were legally segregated by race. In some cases, racially diverse neighborhoods were demolished to make way for segregated government housing. Over time, middle-class white residents moved out of public housing, either taking advantage of federally subsidized mortgages in the suburbs, or being actively evicted due to lower income thresholds. Vacancies were filled with lower-income residents, predominantly minorities excluded from other government programs, who faced ongoing racial discrimination and constituted the majority of the poor population at the time.

==== The GI Bill (1944) ====
At the end of World War II, the GI Bill furthered segregation practices by keeping African Americans out of European American neighborhoods, showing another side to African American housing discrimination. When millions of GIs returned home from overseas, they took advantage of the "Servicemen's Readjustment Act," or the GI Bill. This important document was signed in 1944 by Franklin D. Roosevelt, and gave veterans education and training opportunities, guaranteed loans for home, farm, or business, job finding assistance, and unemployment pay of $20 a week for up to 52 weeks if a veteran could not find a job. This law allowed millions of U.S. soldiers to purchase their first homes with inexpensive mortgages, which meant the huge growth of suburbs and the birth of the ideal of a suburban lifestyle.

African Americans were met with discrimination when trying to purchase a home in the overwhelmingly European American neighborhoods. The realtors would not show these houses to African Americans, and when they did, they would try and talk them out of buying the home. This discrimination was based on the fact that realtors believed they would be losing future business by dealing or listing with African Americans, and that it would be unethical to sell a house in a European American neighborhood to African Americans because it would drive the property values of the surrounding houses down.

Both redlining and discrimination through the GI Bill relegated most African Americans to a concentrated area within the city, so the declining property values and the higher crime rates could be kept in a contained area. The relegation of African Americans to the neighborhoods that were receiving no support due to redlining practices was a self-fulfilling prophecy that created the high crime slums that the city was afraid of.

==== The Fair Housing Act (1968) ====
The overt discriminatory practices of refusal of sale and loans continued unabated until at least 1968, when the Fair Housing Act was passed. After this act was passed, outright refusal to sell property to African Americans became rare, given that that behavior could lead to prosecution under the Fair Housing Law. The Office of Fair Housing and Equal Opportunity is charged with administering and enforcing fair housing laws. Any person who believes that they have faced housing discrimination based on their race can file a fair housing complaint.

The most comprehensive federal fair housing act of its time, this piece of legislation mandated fair housing as a national policy and restricted discriminatory practices. Specifically, discrimination on the basis of race, color, religion, sex, or national origin was prohibited in the rental, sale, financing, and brokerage of housing or housing services. However, this act did not give the Department of Housing and Urban Development (HUD) a lot of enforcing power. HUD was only allowed to mediate housing discrimination disputes between parties. It did not have the power to file lawsuits or take definitive legal action.

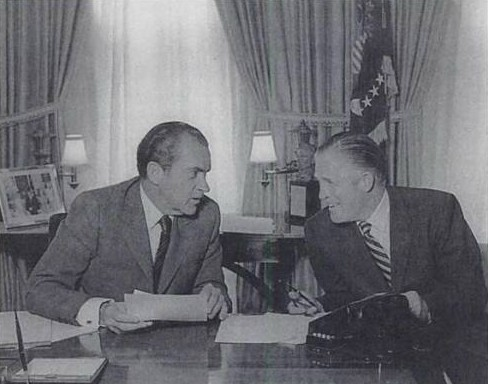
President Nixon and HUD secretary George Romney talk

==== Nixon's Fair Housing Policy (1971) ====
During his presidential term, Nixon's federal housing policy undermined the Fair Housing Act. His policy acknowledged that federal law requires nondiscriminatory practices in federal housing matters but did not provide presidential support. Nixon declared that government could not force suburban desegregation or economic/racial integration. In doing so, he secured many suburban votes but further exacerbated the issue of housing inequality by not supporting subsidized housing programs to help desegregation.

==== The Equal Credit Opportunity Act of 1974 ====
The Equal Credit Opportunity Act provided protection against discrimination from creditors. It stated that creditors could not discriminate against applicants based on race, sex, marital status, religion, ethnicity or age. Designed to supplement the Fair Housing Act in specific forms of housing discrimination, this piece of legislation offered more protection against discrimination in lending practices.

==== The Home Mortgage Disclosure Act of 1975 ====
Like the Equal Credit Opportunity Act of 1974, this piece of legislation was also designed to supplement the Fair Housing Act in specific areas of housing discrimination. This act protected applicants from discrimination through lending institutions by requiring that any financial institution providing federally related mortgage loan disclose data annually. This included reports of the amount and location of loans related to federal housing (by census tract or ZIP code). The purpose of this was to prevent lending discrimination in certain localities.

==== The Community Reinvestment Act of 1977 ====
The Community Reinvestment Act of 1977 required banks to apply the same anti-discriminatory guidelines to their lending criteria in all circumstances. These acts did not completely stop discriminatory practices, however. The discrimination moved into more subtle techniques, including racial steering and misinformation given to African American prospective buyers. Although these laws exist in theory, they have not accomplished their goal of eradicating discrimination based on race in the housing market. Audits of the housing market in Chicago, Detroit, Los Angeles, and many other major metropolitan areas have shown discrimination toward African Americans continuing into the 80s, long after the anti-discrimination laws were passed.

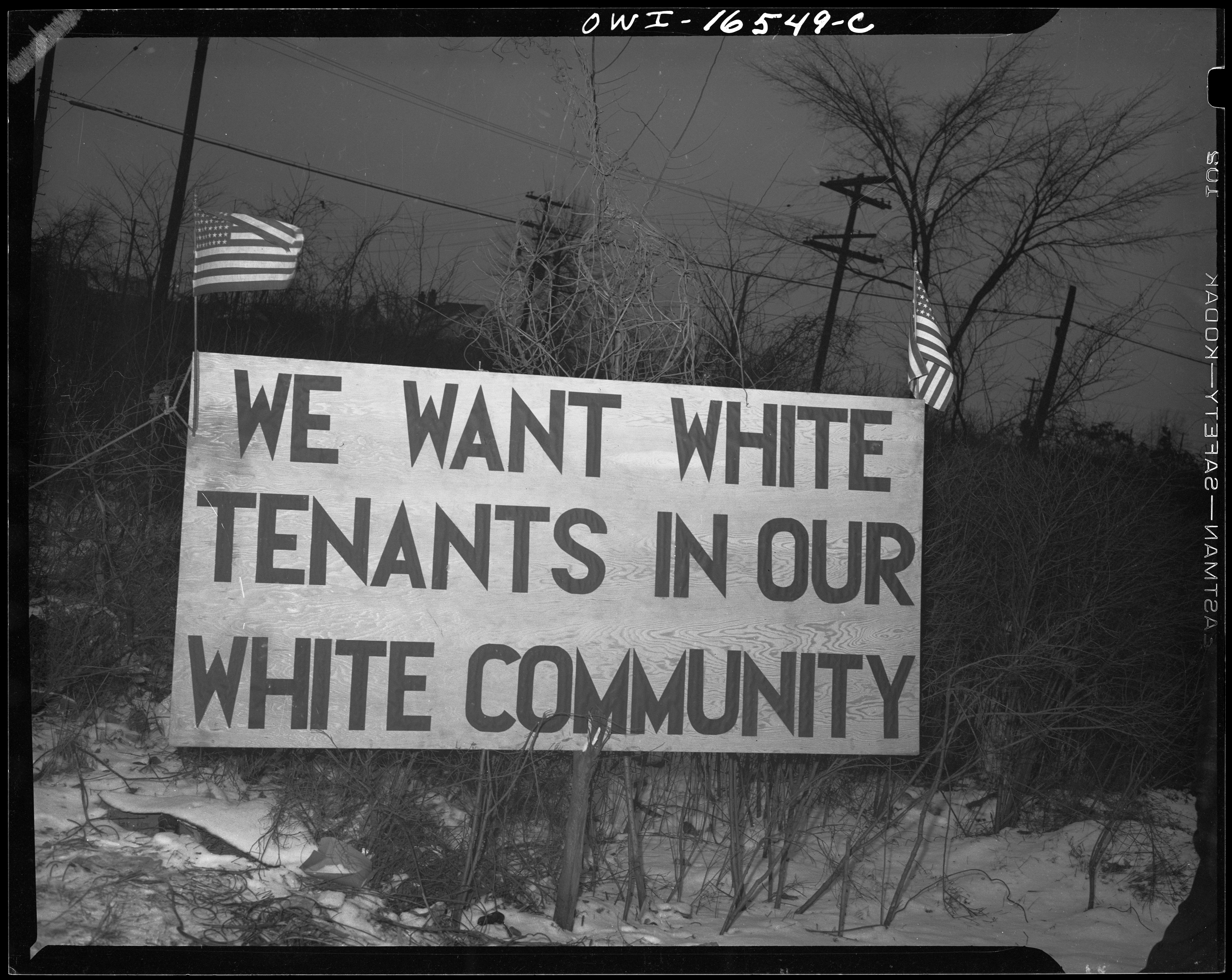
Sign with American flag "We want white tenants in our white community," directly opposite the Sojourner Truth homes, a new U.S. federal housing project in Detroit, Michigan. A riot was caused by white neighbors' attempts to prevent African American tenants from moving in. Photograph by Arthur Siegel.

=== Trends by minority group ===
Residential segregation is typically measured by evenness and exposure. Evenness is defined as the relative dispersion of a certain racial group in a metropolitan area whereas exposure is defined as how much a member of a certain racial group is exposed to a member of another racial group. In general, the number of integrated neighborhoods have continued to increase since the passing of the Fair Housing Act in 1968. In addition, the number of exclusively white neighborhoods have been decreasing. Although there has been an increase of a minority population presence in suburbs, residential segregation continues to persist. On average, it is more likely for minority groups to be exposed to mixed neighborhoods than white populations. Residential segregation is not limited to the private housing market. Discriminatory practices also take place within the federal public housing system.

==== African American ====
Overall, in the period from 1980 to 2000, residential segregation between the black and white population has decreased at a greater rate than other minority groups. However, the African American population, currently the second largest minority group in the United States, still experiences the greatest residential segregation compared to other minority groups. The older industrial cities of the Midwest and Northeast, experience the highest levels of black-white residential segregation, while the newer metropolitan areas of the South are experiences lesser levels of black-white residential segregation. The presence of a black population in the suburbs continues to increase with 40% of African Americans currently living in the suburbs.

==== Latino ====
Due to Immigration to the United States over the past decades, the Latino population has grown exponentially, making Latinos the largest minority group in the United States. After African Americans, Latinos experience the second highest level of residential segregation. From 1980 to 2000, the level of neighborhood dissimilarity and isolation increased between the Latino population and the white population. Although around 50% of Latinos live in the suburban area, it is projected that with increasing immigration, the divide between Latino and white populations will continue to persist in residential areas.

==== Asian ====
Asians in the United States are a diverse group with a complex historical background. Chinese Americans first came to the United States in the mid-1800s during the California Gold Rush, and Japanese Americans emigrated to the United States in the late 1800s as indentured servants. These populations faced systemic discrimination forcing them to live close together, particularly segregating in national origin-specific groups in major cities. Asian immigration to the US then increased in the 1960s after reform and passage of the Immigration and Nationality Act of 1965. Due to immigration to the United States over the past decades, the Asian population has grown considerably, making Asians the third largest minority group in the United States. Similar to the Latino and Black minority groups, the Asian minority group experiences high levels of isolation and dissimilarity to their white counterparts. From 1980 to 2000, these levels have only increased. Currently 55% of Asians live in the suburban area, but their levels of isolation from their White counterparts have increased over time despite residential mobility. Several factors can contribute to residential isolation including recent immigration status, level of English language proficiency, and level of acculturation to American society. Socioeconomic status can also contribute to residential segregation, and Chinatowns in the United States continue to represent a large concentration of Asian poverty.

==== Senior ====
The Fair Housing Act of 1968 and the Housing for Older Persons Act of 1995 allow residential communities to restrict residency to the senior. These communities are set up to accommodate older individuals who dislike having young residents as neighbors.

== Causes ==
=== Neighborhood disinvestment ===
Neighborhood disinvestment is a systematic withdrawal of capital and neglect of public services by the city. Public services may include schools; building, street, and park maintenance; garbage collection and transportation. Absentee landlordism and mortgage redlining also characterize disinvestment. As redlining prevents households from owning, they have no choice but to rent from landlords that neglect property and charge high rent. These factors allow the devalorization cycle to occur in a neighborhood, eventually leading to the reclamation and transformation of the neighborhood, uprooting the poor residents who have no equity to use for relocation.

A deeper look into disinvestment in the community can be termed devalorization. This is when neighborhood decline is analyzed by emphasizing the profit taking of realtors, bankers, and speculators which systematically reduces the worth or value of housing. The devalorization of a neighborhood begins to occur when the city decides to begin disinvesting in it, and the disproportionate influx of minorities shift the neighborhood from mostly live-in owners to absentee landlords. These landlords buy up the houses during white flight from the neighborhood and rent them to the minorities moving in for a high price. In Albina, this process was shown through intensive white flight from the neighborhood, and large redevelopment projects that destroyed the heart of the African American community for the remodeling of a veteran's hospital. This project relocated many African Americans into an even smaller area, creating an overcrowded, volatile environment. Most of the community that survived did not own their homes, and the absentee landlords neglected to make repairs on their properties. The relocation of so many African Americans from southern Albina because of the hospital project caused more white flight on the northern side of Albina, creating more opportunities for landlords use the tactic of blockbusting, or using the fear of racial turnover and property value decline to convince homeowners to sell at below-market prices, allowing the landlords to then inflate the cost of the property and extort the new African American home buyers.

The relegation of African Americans to certain contained neighborhoods continues today. The cycle of neighborhood disinvestment followed by gentrification and dislocation of the minority has made it difficult for African Americans to establish themselves, build equity, and try to break out into suburban neighborhoods. If they have the means to relocate, the neighborhoods they relocate to are most likely populated by European American people who support open housing laws in theory, but become uncomfortable and relocate if they are faced with a rising Black population in their own neighborhood. This white flight creates an overwhelmingly African-American neighborhood, and then disinvestment begins anew. All of these subtle discriminatory practices leave the metropolitan African American population with few options, forcing them to remain in disinvested neighborhoods with rising crime, gang activity, and dilapidated housing.

=== Real-estate discrimination ===
There is an existence of a dual housing market that results in unequal housing opportunities for different populations of people. The basis of the dual housing market model is that similar housing opportunities are available to different racial groups at different prices. There are many explanations for the existence of a dual housing market. One theory explains the dual housing market through racial steering. This occurs when real estate brokers steer their clients to specific geographic locations of available housing based on race. Although racial discrimination in housing market processes is outlawed by several court decisions and legislation, there is evidence that it still occurs. For example, an HUD Housing Market Practice survey found that African Americans felt discriminated against in the renting and/or buying process of housing. Institutional factors, such as realtor agencies withholding housing information or financial institutions denying mortgages, further perpetuate the effects of the dual housing market model.

Another explanation of the existence of a dual housing market is the availability of housing units, either for sale or for rent, for minority groups. Oftentimes, price discriminations results from price fluctuations of property based on the existing demographic of residence in a neighborhood. Racial preference affects the available geographic spaces open to certain minority groups. For example, African Americans are disproportionately found in a small distribution of suburban communities.

=== Socioeconomic status ===
One theory of the cause of residential segregation is the difference in income between minority groups and their white counterparts. The basis of this theory stems from purchasing power: the higher the income, the more likely minority groups are to move to better neighborhoods which in turn results in more integrated neighborhoods. In other words, there seems to be an inverse relationship between a minority group's socioeconomic status and the minority group's level of residential segregation. Many argue that residential segregation occurs because minority groups, particularly immigrants, do not have the wealth or income to purchase homes in more affluent and predominantly white neighborhoods. Although there is a definite relationship between socioeconomic status and residential segregation, the effect of this relationship is different among minority groups.

In terms of location, poverty-stricken communities tend to reside in the inner cities while affluent communities tend to reside in the suburbs. In addition, better neighborhoods contain better educational services and easier access to various occupations. This spatial and economic segregation further perpetuates residential segregation. Across all minority groups, there is a residential gap based on income. Residential segregation between the rich and the poor, occurring at different rates, takes place across the board.

African Americans and Latinos, compared to their white counterpart, experience a greater difference in income, education, and occupation levels. On the other hand, Asians experience a lesser difference in terms of income, education, and occupation levels when compared to their white counterpart. These factors, education and occupation, influence income and purchasing power of an individual. For African Americans, Asians, and Latinos, higher income resulted in less segregation from their white counterpart whereas lower income resulted in greater segregation from their white counterpart. However, that an increase in socioeconomic status resulted in a greater decrease in segregation for Latinos and Asians and a lesser decrease in segregation for African Americans suggests that socioeconomic status alone cannot explain residential segregation.

=== Spatial assimilation and immigration ===
Recent reforms and policies on Immigration to the United States have caused an influx of immigrants from Latin America and Asia. The spatial assimilation theory states that immigrants are more likely to experience residential segregation because of a variety of factors such as social networks, family, income, and cultural preference. Upon moving to a new country, immigrants are more likely to relocate to an area where they have feel comfortable and accepted. In addition, their income may only allow them to occupy spaces that are more ethnically diverse. The three generation model is a theory that attempts to explain assimilation across generations. It states that over time, as the children of immigrants become more acculturated, they begin to disperse geographically and assimilate themselves in suburban neighborhoods. Therefore, there is a correlation between residential segregation and the intergenerational process of assimilation.

The acculturation of immigrant children also relates to the socioeconomic status of the parent or parents. As the children become more acculturated to the customs of the host country, they become more comfortable with the cultural norms and improve their speaking abilities. A higher socioeconomic status allows them to disperse from the ethnically concentrated community and move into neighborhoods with better services and quality housing. This process across several generations eventually results in the continued desegregation of more affluent, predominantly white, suburban neighborhoods.

Among all minority groups, foreign-born immigrants experience greater segregation from whites than native-born groups. However, assimilation varies among minority groups. Overall, Latino-white segregation is higher than Asian-white segregation. Black-white segregation is the highest when comparing all minority groups. New immigrants tend to experience higher levels of segregation than immigrants that have lived in the host country for a while.

== Effects ==
=== Relocation ===
Once their old neighborhood has been gentrified, many of the residents are forced to relocate, if they have not already done so. When hunting for a new residence, African Americans will more than likely encounter discrimination on some level. Audits performed by the US Department of Housing and Urban Development and a later Housing Development Study suggest that if realtors have a chance to discriminate, they usually do. These studies analyzed the number of cases where whites were given more information about available units or financing options or shown extra units in proportion to African Americans. The results showed that whites were systematically favored for both rental and sales units throughout metropolitan areas in the United States. Racial steering was also taken into account during these audits, and it was shown through the results that African Americans were shown homes in areas that had more minorities, lower home values, or lower median incomes that the homes that were shown to European Americans, even if their economic position was the same. It was shown that about one in every three encounters, African Americans were systematically steered to these non-European American neighborhoods.

This segregation is not self-imposed. That is, African Americans do not prefer to live in neighborhoods that are overwhelmingly Black. Survey evidence from a Detroit Area Survey from 1976 shows that African Americans strongly favor the desegregation of the United States, with the overall ideal neighborhood being 50% black and 50% white. Whites, on the other hand, favor neighborhood composition that is dominated by whites. In the same survey, about one-quarter of the whites surveyed said they would feel uncomfortable if their neighborhood exceeded 8% Black. Once the neighborhood reached 21% Black, almost half of the whites surveyed said they would feel uncomfortable.

=== Behavioral effects ===
One of the important social effects on the individual that results from residential segregation is the influence on behavior. Segregated communities tend to slow the rate of assimilation, especially in the ability to speak English, which is considered a primary aspect of assimilating in the United States. The ability to speak English has been shown to result in the increased rate of desegregation in communities. Another behavioral influence of residential segregation is the effect on social networks created. Friendships and marriages tend to occur at a higher probability among people living in close proximities. In other words, people who are spatially separate are less likely to form lasting relationships. A negative behavioral influence of residential segregation is the perpetuation of violence. Specifically with gang activity, the higher the level of segregation, the greater the density of altercations between rival gangs.

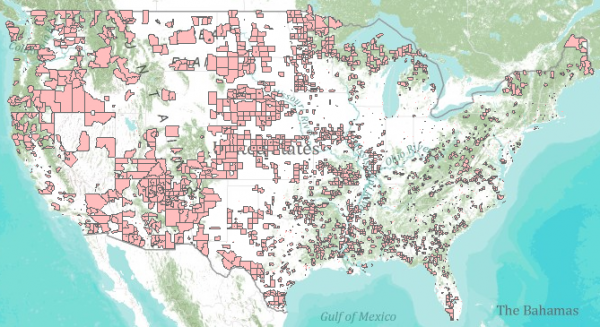
USDA Food Desert Locator Map

=== Health ===
Many studies have shown that racial or ethnic minority neighborhoods are disproportionally affected by health issues related to the environment, such as a lack of healthy food options, a lack of available pharmacies, and an increased number of advertisements for alcohol and tobacco. In addition, there has been a trend over the past few years of a concentration of ethnic minorities in low-income urban neighborhoods. One of the factors associated with this rise in urban, low-income neighborhoods is residential segregation. Many of these urban, low-income neighborhoods experience unequal accessibility to services compared to their suburban counterparts, which often results in an unhealthy food environment.

One of the main reasons for the increasing presence of unhealthy food environments in these neighborhoods is the emergence of food deserts. Several theories regarding the rise of food deserts in low-income neighborhoods are circulating in the literature. One of the prevailing theories states that food deserts resulted from the development of larger supermarkets in affluent areas and the closure of small, independent groceries stores that could not compete economically. Another theory states that supermarket development shifted spatially with the rise of income segregation. As more the more affluent middle-class moved to the suburbs, many inner city grocery stores closed from lack of business. Another prevailing theory is the idea of supermarket redlining, the unwillingness of supermarkets to open stores in the inner city due to various economic reasons.

This overall development of unhealthy food environments in low-income urban neighborhoods affects the development of health in the community members. The lack of healthy food options forces these residents to purchase and consume energy dense food options such as meals from fast-food restaurants. These residents are also forced to purchase highly processed foods because of the lack of fresh food options. In addition, food at independently owned grocery stores are often 10–60% more expensive than food offered at large chain supermarkets.

Another area of health equity issues that disproportionately effects minority neighborhoods are safety related concerns. One safety topic in particular that is increasing in concern is the trend of fire events disproportionately impacting minority communities throughout the United States. The most recent tragedy was the fire event in the Bronx, New York City at the Twin Parks affordable housing building that killed approximately 19 people, all of whom were immigrant families from Gambia and other West African countries. The cause of these deaths can be directly attributed to the building management's failure of meeting the needs of providing a safe shelter for their occupants. The primary factor was failing to provide heat throughout the building which forced tenants to use space heaters or other methods of heating their apartments, which were unsafe. As one can expect, a fire broke out, but the secondary factor that made this fire more tragic is the building's lack of fire protection systems in place which allowed smoke to travel throughout the building resulting in smoke inhalation as the cause for all the deaths.

This trend is becoming all too familiar throughout the United States as these events have been reported across major cities in lower income neighborhoods. In New York City specifically, the NYC Comptroller came out with a 2023 report finding 1000+ buildings have a chronic history of not providing heat over the last 5 years and the city failing to enforce any action on 25% of those buildings. What this illustrates is that there are many more potential fire events that can be triggered by tenants who are just trying to keep warm. Furthermore, many of these affordable housing buildings again lack working fire prevention devices like smoke detectors, and other fire protection systems such as sprinkler systems, which will ultimately lead to more deaths if systems in place were unenforced.

=== Education ===
Housing segregation has an effect on the quality of education received by community members. Specifically, the spatial separation of specific populations due to housing segregation leads to geographic concentrations of quality education. For example, public schools in suburban areas are usually more equipped with resources, have a higher percentage quality teachers, and produce a larger amount of successful students. The negative effects of housing segregation on quality of education is demonstrated by the lack of integration and diversity in schools. The Equality of Educational Opportunity study in 1966 found that racial composition of schools impacted student success more than the resources available to schools. This cycle of unequal educational opportunities is perpetuated by the real estate market. Areas with quality school systems usually contain higher housing prices and higher property taxes. In addition, these areas are typically racially and economically homogenous.

One of the primary reasons of unequal educational opportunities is the low accessibility to the suburbs by minority groups due to lack of income. The suburban areas, containing higher quality education, are less accessible to low-income minority groups. Another reason of unequal education opportunities is the rise in options of schooling for parents. In addition to public schools, parents with enough purchasing power can opt to send their children to private schools, magnet schools and even home school. Other options include charter schools. These various educational options contribute to the relationship between school quality and school enrollment demographics. Quality of education also affects the outcomes of community members. In other words, the kind of education children receive plays a major role in economic opportunities in their future. Students surrounded by other educated members of the community often experience more success with school. Furthermore, community environment and housing quality affect the drop-out rate of students.

=== Poverty ===
Housing segregation affects the development of concentrated areas of poverty, especially among racial minorities groups. Housing segregation interacts with existing poverty rates among minority groups, especially African Americans and Latinos, to perpetuate the cycle of poor people moving into concentrated areas of poverty. These concentrated areas of poverty often experience a lack of public services and infrastructure. Studies have shown that these residential areas often have less employment opportunities, unequal schooling environments, and increased health risks. These factors combine to perpetuate poverty and prevent social and spatial mobility. The lack of employment opportunities come in many different forms such as decreased accessibility to jobs because of transportation or unavailability of jobs due to location. The result of unequal economic opportunities is the increase in income segregation. This further perpetuates poverty because low-income residents experience higher rent burden which forces them to accept low quality housing. This cycle of poverty also extends between generations. This means that children living in low-income neighborhoods are more likely to experience poverty and the same living standards as their parents' generation.

In addition to income segregation, the effects of housing segregation on the development of concentrated areas of poverty are also associated with class and racial segregation. Class segregation plays a role in the concentration of poverty areas in that affluent classes of society have a desire to spatially separate themselves from the less fortune, poverty-stricken class. As a result, they move towards more affluent neighborhoods leaving the poor concentrated in a certain area. Racial segregation also plays a role in the concentration of poverty areas. In fact, the degree of housing segregation due to racial differences is greater than the degree of housing segregation due to class differences. The three factors of income, class, and racial segregation can explain the increasing concentration of poverty in certain areas. All three of these factors can be associated with the causes and effects of housing segregation.

== Initiatives against housing segregation ==
Seal of the United States Department of Housing and Urban Development (HUD). The seal is a representative of high rise buildings simulating an eagle and giving emphasis to the "urban" in HUD's name. The eagle (shown abstractly) is a symbol of federal authority. The use of green symbolizes open space, land, growth and prosperity. The blue in the Seal alludes to the quality of life and environment in America's cities.

=== Community building strategies ===
The relationship of community members is often affected by their physical surroundings. Diverse neighborhoods containing various racial and ethnic groups experience many barriers to community collectivism, such as culture, economic background, and fundamental values. However, having a strong community building strategy can help break down barriers of segregation. Leaders of community strong pro-diversity organizations stress the need for a sense of community among members. Creating a diverse and stable neighborhood requires focusing on economic development, community safety, and education.

Focusing on economic development means creating a market in the existing neighborhood. This not only creates jobs for community members but also inhibits disinvestment, a common cause of housing segregation, in neighborhoods. Community safety strongly influences the perception of the stability of a neighborhood. Active participation of community members in the safety of their neighborhood increases community efficacy because there is a perception of controlled crime which, in turn, gives people a sense of control over their quality of life. Education is also related to the positive, or negative, perception of a neighborhood. Schools not only foster safe environments for cross-cultural cooperation but also influence community attitudes towards race, ethnicity, and diversity.

=== U.S. Department of Housing and Urban Development ===
Traditionally, public housing programs perpetuate housing segregation by forcing minority populations in low-income neighborhoods containing lower quality housing options. Public housing has also been engineered to keep minorities out to keep the integrity of the so called "White suburb" and placed minority groups in other areas. However, the Section 8 housing program combats this problem by providing households with housing certificates/vouchers that can be used to rent units anywhere in the private market at a moderate price. In other words, low-income families have the chance to move into affordable and higher quality housing. This option of choice and mobility offers a solution to the social and economic isolation of minority populations. In addition, families using these housing vouchers are more likely than public housing residents to live in racially and economically integrated neighborhoods.

The U.S. Department of Housing and Urban Development federal housing assistance program is the nation's largest housing assistance program. Recipients of the voucher/certificate contribute 30% of their income to paying the rent and the government subsidizes the difference. The program is not only less costly because it relies on the existing housing market, but also more likely to offer affordable and quality housing to participants. This program contrasts previous housing programs which often clumped federally funded families into low-income urban neighborhoods. This program is extremely effective, with the majority of participants living in areas that are less than 20% poor.

Despite this effectiveness, there is still a racial disparity among participant success. Overall, participants across all races are more likely to live in low-poverty, racially heterogenous neighborhoods compared to their counterparts in public housing. However, African American and Latino recipients are much more likely to live in high poverty areas compared to white recipients.

== See also ==
- Housing discrimination in the United States
- Racial inequality in the United States § Housing segregation
- Income inequality in the United States
- Racism
- Zoning in the United States
- Return to the Land
- EPIC City, Texas
- Kiryas Joel, New York
- New Square, New York − an all-Hasidic village
- Kaser, New York − an all-Hasidic village
