= African Americans in Milwaukee =

The African American community in Milwaukee has a long history, dating back to the city's early days. However, the most significant period for this community was during the Great Migration, when many black southerners moved to northern, industrial, urban centers throughout the twentieth century.

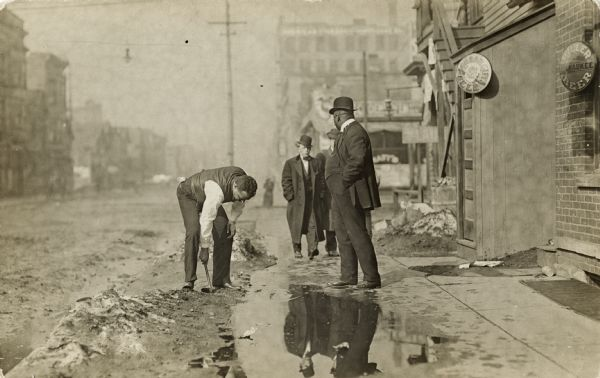
Two African American men outside tavern. C. 1905

In Milwaukee, the black population remained relatively small until World War II. For instance, in 1915, there were only 1,500 black residents in the city. Like other black communities across the country, African Americans in Milwaukee faced the challenges of the Jim Crow Era. Due to strict residential segregation, they were confined to an area known as "Milwaukee's Little Africa." This district, like similar ones in other cities, housed both middle and upper class African Americans, as well as poor blacks and other racial and ethnic groups.

Despite facing housing discrimination and job discrimination, the black community in Milwaukee responded by relying on self-help strategies and building local institutions. These efforts were a testament to the resilience and determination of a community living in a city that was shaped by its industrial landscape. Following World War II, economic opportunities in industrial work increased, leading to a rapid growth of Milwaukee's black community. By the early twenty-first century, African Americans made up around 40–45% of the city's population.
