= East Plano Islamic Center =

Mosque in Plano, Texas, USA

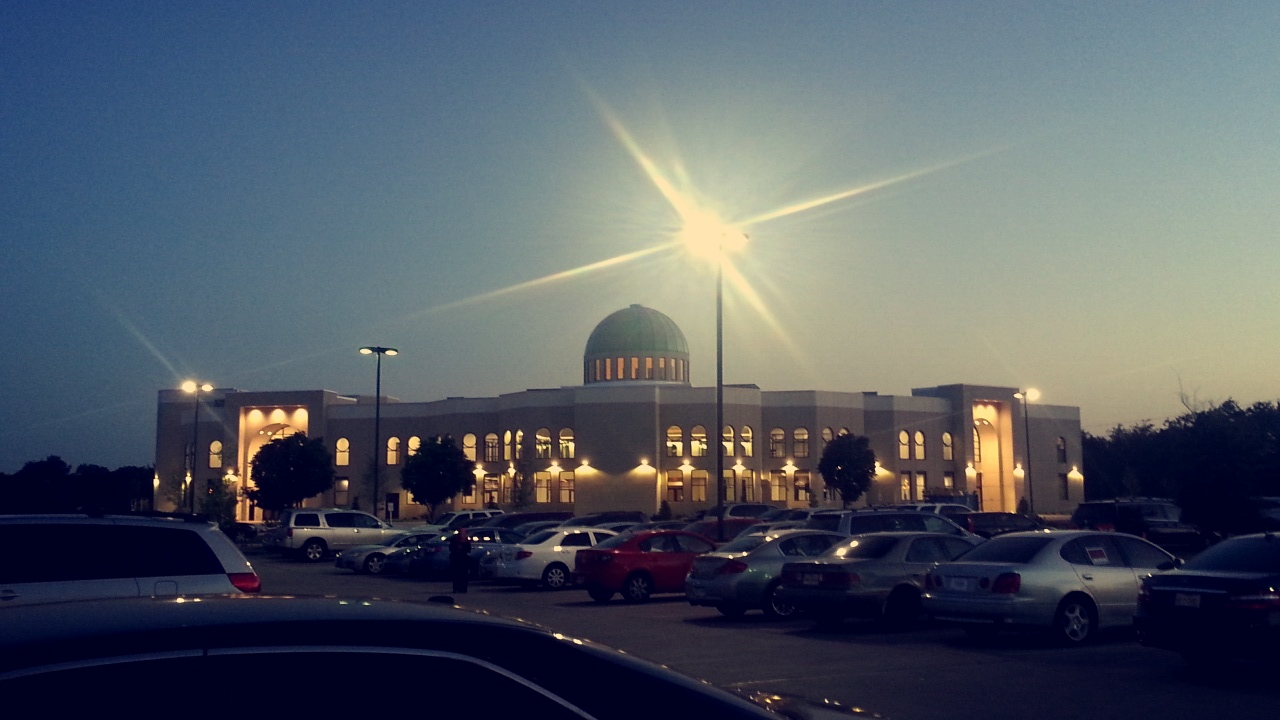

- Location in Texas

Religion
- Affiliation: Islam
- Branch/tradition: Sunni
- Ecclesiastical or organizational status: Non-profit religious organization
- Leadership: Imam Nadim Bashir, Ustadh Mohamad Baajour, Sheikh Dr. Yasir Qadhi, Sheikh Sajjad Gul, and Brother Abdul Rahman Idris

Location
- Location: 4700 14th ST, Plano, Texas 75074
- Interactive map of East Plano Islamic Center
- Coordinates: 33.0110206°N 96.64592379999999°W

Architecture
- Type: Mosque
- Established: 2003

Specifications
- Capacity: 3,200
- Interior area: 33,000 square feet
- Dome: 1
- Minaret: 0

Website
- Official Website

The East Plano Islamic Center (EPIC) is a mosque located in Plano, Texas. The current building of the masjid opened in July 2015. The current Imam is Nadim Bashir, and the current resident scholar is Yasir Qadhi. The mosque is one of many mosques in the Dallas-Fort Worth area.

== History ==
EPIC started with small gatherings in several garages in 2003 and became a non-profit later that year. The founders would meet up in the Islamic Association of North Texas and would plan its future. After a location in a trailer followed by a location in a strip mall, EPIC moved to a building of about 10,000 square feet in 2008. It moved into a much larger, newer facility in 2015. The mosque had its first funeral service in June 2016, for a high school student who grew up going to EPIC.

=== COVID-19 ===
During the COVID-19 pandemic, EPIC masjid was cautious about reopening in full due its large population of doctors and specialists who saw the pandemic effects first hand. EPIC masjid was the last to open all prayer areas from March 13, 2020, to April 9, 2021, although the main Musalla was closed during that time. It had even more restrictions in Ramadan 2021. It had the least restrictions of any masjid during Eid-ul-Adha of 2020 with prayers in the gym area with limited capacity. One year later, for Ramadan 2022, all COVID restrictions were gone, including mask mandates. During 2021 Ramadan, the masjid was able to raise close to a million dollars (~$814,500) during its fundraising night.

=== EPIC City ===
In 2024, EPIC announced EPIC City, a planned Islamic community-centered residential development project in Texas, situated approximately 40 minutes from Dallas near the town of Josephine. The initiative spans 402 acres across unincorporated portions of Collin and Hunt counties. The proposed community is designed to feature over 1,000 residential units, along with a mosque, a K–12 faith-based school, a community college, and commercial shopping facilities.

== See also ==
- List of mosques in the Americas
- Lists of mosques
- List of mosques in the United States
- Islam in the Dallas–Fort Worth metroplex
