= Yusuf Ziya Kavakçı =

20th-century Islamic scholar and influential figure in the history of Islam in Dallas

Personal life
- Born: 22 June 1938 (age 88) Hendek, Sakarya, Turkey
- Region: Turkey
- Main interest: Fiqh (Islamic jurisprudence)
- Education: PhD; University of Istanbul
- Occupation: professor

Religious life
- Religion: Islam
- Denomination: Sunni
- Jurisprudence: Hanafi

Muslim leader
- Influenced by: Abu Hanifa

Yusuf Ziya Kavakçı (born 22 June 1938) is a Turkish American Islamic cleric and the father of Turkish politician Merve Kavakçı. He was very influential in establishing Islamic institutions of learning in North Texas.

== Life ==
=== Early life ===
Imam Yusuf was born in 1938 in Sakarya, Hendek to a family that emigrated from Georgia. He grew up not speaking much of Turkish, and speaking Georgian, although he learned to speak Turkish when he was 8 to 9. At a young age, he was trained in the Islamic sciences, having memorized the Quran at an early age, studied the fields of tajweed, Quran, Arabic, Tafsir, hadith, fiqh and other Islamic sciences and graduated from the Hasırcılar Quran Course. After successful exams, he worked as an Imam, Muezzin and Mufti in Istanbul. Kavakçı graduated from the Faculty of Law of the University of Istanbul and the Istanbul Yüksek İslam Enstitüsü and received his doctorate in 1967. The professorship followed in 1980. He was Dean of the Theological Faculty of Atatürk University in Erzurum. He was also taught by Muhammad Hamidullah.

=== In the United States ===
Kavakci left Turkey because his daughter was not allowed to study there while wearing a headscarf. He moved to the United States. He worked as a visiting professor at universities such as Philadelphia and Cambridge. In 1988, he moved to Texas, becoming the Resident Scholar and Imam of the Islamic Association of North Texas, and the founder and instructor of the private school IANT Quranic Academy in Richardson, Texas and founding dean of the Suffa Islamic Seminary in Dallas.

He was one of the 138 signatories of the open letter A Common Word Between Us and You, to "leaders of Christian churches everywhere" (October 13, 2007). He was listed among the 100 most Influential Muslims in 2009.

=== Return to Turkey ===
Kavakçı eventually moved back to Turkey, and is currently a retired faculty member and lectures in theology departments of the Theology Faculties of Istanbul and Marmara University. In addition to numerous Turkish books, he has also published English books on Islamic law.
