= EPIC City, Texas =

Planned Islamic community-centered residential development project in Texas

- Planned community
- Location in Texas Location in the United States
- Coordinates: 33°5′22.3″N 96°18′16.6″W
- Country: US
- State: Texas
- County: Collin and Hunt
- Website: Official website

EPIC City is a master-planned Islamic community-centered residential development project in Texas, situated approximately 40 minutes from Dallas near the town of Josephine. The initiative spans 402 acres across unincorporated portions of Collin and Hunt counties, and was initiated by the East Plano Islamic Center (EPIC).

Since its announcement in 2024, the project has generated both significant interest from potential residents and controversy from political figures and social media commentators.

== Overview ==
EPIC City is a development project initiated by the East Plano Islamic Center (EPIC) to be managed through its specially created entity, Community Capital Partners. Imran Chaudhary, who was previously the mosque's president of its board of directors, holds the position of executive officer and director of the Community Capital Partners business. The proposed community is designed to feature over 1,000 residential units, along with a mosque, a K–12 faith-based school, a community college, and commercial shopping facilities. According to organizational representatives, the East Plano Islamic Center will receive all profits generated by the development. The leadership team of Community Capital Partners consists of volunteers who reportedly will not receive compensation for their work on the project.

The development plan also expanded to include two additional projects called EPIC Ranches One and Two. EPIC Ranch One is planned to be a roughly 110 acre project approximately half a mile from the main EPIC City development, containing 70 residential lots ranging from one to five acres. EPIC Ranch Two is planned to be a roughly 90-acre site located within a mile from the main EPIC City development, containing 60 half-acre residential lots and 27 upscale townhome lots.

EPIC resident scholar Yasir Qadhi described the community as a "Muslim neighborhood" that would remain "well integrated" within the broader community. Project representatives emphasized that the development aims to create a "diverse and inclusive" community where people of various backgrounds can coexist harmoniously. To reserve lots in the main EPIC City development, investors must purchase an $80,000 share in Community Capital Partners, which will later be credited toward a home lot purchase. For EPIC Ranches properties, investors must provide $30,000 in earnest money to secure a lot.

== History ==
The EPIC City project was publicly launched in 2024, resulting in more than 500 lots being reserved within days of the project's reveal.

As of February 2025, the EPIC City project remained in the planning and development phase, with finalized proposals still pending. On February 14, 2025, the EPIC Ranches One and Two were announced as an extension of the original proposal.

While some property owners from neighboring areas indicated plans to relocate due to the anticipated changes to the area's rural character, others have noted potential benefits from increased property values. According to local reports, several property values in the area have potentially doubled since the announcement of EPIC City.

== Controversy ==
The announcement of the project sparked controversy and multiple political responses. On February 24, 2025, Texas Governor Greg Abbott publicly expressed opposition to the development, sharing concerns on social media platform X (formerly Twitter). Abbott specifically stated: "To be clear, Sharia law is not allowed in Texas. Nor are Sharia cities. Nor are 'no go zones' which this project seems to imply." The governor's comments were in response to characterizations of the project as a "402-Acre Sharia City" by conservative commentator Amy Mek, though no public statements from the project organizers had overtly referenced implementing Sharia law or creating governance structures separate from existing U.S. laws.

Shortly after Governor Abbot's February claims on X, Texas Representative Jeff Leach requested an investigation into “EPIC City”. In March 2025, the Texas Funeral Service Commission sent a cease-and-desist to EPIC, halting its funeral and burial services. The cease-and-desist order has since been dropped after EPIC sued the commission for sending the order under false pretenses.

In response to the controversy, Community Capital Partners issued a statement affirming their commitment to comply with the Fair Housing Act, which prohibits discrimination in housing based on protected characteristics, including religion. The developers stated they would not impose "blanket bans on any group of people" but would conduct "thorough individualized assessments of prospective buyers" to ensure alignment with community goals of "safety and security."

Project representative Yasir Qadhi emphasized that EPIC City was not intended to be isolated from the wider community, stating: "We are not forming a cult. We're not forming big barriers between the rest of society. We're going to be giving back to this state and this country, and we're going to be showing what it means to be a Muslim neighborhood." The developers modified language on their website after questions from media, removing text that had indicated sales would be limited to "persons we believe will contribute to the overall makeup of our community."

Local residents expressed concerns primarily related to infrastructure and environmental impacts rather than religious or cultural aspects of the development. Key concerns included increased traffic on narrow rural roads, environmental impacts on local ecosystems and wildlife, prominent construction-related noises and disruption, and additional strain on local resources and services. That said, Texas has a reputation of "easy permitting" and cutting through environmental concerns quickly for most development projects, so these concerns are not considered the main reason for the government pushback the project has faced.

In April 2025, Gov. Abbott launched multiple state investigations of EPIC, temporarily halting any construction from going forward. Many in the Islamic community believe these investigations are unfair, politically motivated and based on negative stereotypes of Muslims.

On June 20, 2025, Governor Abbott signed Texas House Bill 4211 (HB 4211) with the intent of placing restrictions on developments like EPIC City that would prevent them from becoming "discriminatory compounds" that practice local laws which are contradictory to laws found in the American legal system. Governor Abbott specifically stated, "[This law] requires disputes to be resolved by Texas law and Texas courts, not Sharia law." In response, EPIC City's legal attorney, Dan Cogdell, stated, "We were never going to invoke Sharia law... We were never going to have Muslim-only ownership."

The United States Department of Justice ("DOJ") has also stepped in to examine the project, at the invitation of Texas politicians. The DOJ ended its investigation a month later, saying the developers had pledged to abide by federal fair-housing laws.

On December 5, 2025, Texas Attorney General Ken Paxton filed suit against EPIC City claiming securities fraud. Also in December EPIC City has been met with pushback from individuals associated with the far-right such as the conservative online personality Jake Lang. Lang organized an "anti-Islam" protest outside of the EPIC mosque, where he held the severed head of a pig and marched alongside other demonstrators holding a banner which read "Americans against Islamification."

As of March 2026, EPIC has faced a lawsuit against its utility district, Plat Application Approval Denial, calls for a public hearing, and even calls for Collin County to reject the project entirely.

== History and timeline ==
February 2024: EPIC (East Plano Islamic Center) made an announcement about the construction of a new housing development in Josephine, TX. They advertised that the development would include an Islamic school, sports facilities, a commercial area, and apartments and homes to provide living space to residents.

October 2024: EPIC released a video going into detail about the future development's plans and modeling. This video went viral and caused controversy online within right-wing groups, leading to an increase in conversation and commentary. Of the most notable of these commentators was Amy Mek who leads the Rise Align Ignite Reclaim Foundation who posted extensively about the project. Mekelberg's Islamophobic comments would eventually catch the attention of Governor Greg Abbott.

February 24, 2025: Governor Abbott commented on X about the project, spurring further comments from other politicians in Texas.

March 24, 2025: Governor Abbott announced that multiple Texas state agencies would be launching investigations into the legality of EPIC's compound. Abbott also stated that he had tasked Texas Attorney General Ken Paxton with doing his own digging into the matter.

March 25, 2025: Attorney General Paxton announces that he would be going forward with a civil investigation into the contractor in charge of EPIC City, Community Capital Partners, which itself is an affiliate of EPIC.

March 26, 2025: The Texas Funeral Commission sent a cease-and-desist letter to EPIC, halting their funeral services division. Abbott claimed that this was the first of many legal hurdles to come into EPIC's way and that the "proposed community will never see the light of day". In the same day, Abbott then opened up another investigation, this time on the premise of possible fraud. He claimed that EPIC was misleading its project's investors and that "Defrauding Texans will not be tolerated". He ended up concluding that day's statements by stating "All entities in Texas must follow state law, not Sharia law".

March 31, 2025: The Collin County Commissioners Court held a public hearing about EPIC City and invited DFW residents to express their opinions.

April 3, 2025: EPIC in an official statement announced that the addresses of mosque leaders had been leaked following the online folly and that threats had been made to their mosque, their congregation, and the Muslim community at large. They said that they hired a lawyer in response to all this.

April 23, 2025: Senator Cornyn announces an investigation by the Department of Justice into the project.

May 11, 2025: Abbott reiterates his commitment to stalling the EPIC City Project but reduces the number of state agencies involved in the endeavor by half.

July 2, 2025: Epic files a lawsuit against the Texas Funeral Services Commission to perform funerals amongst its congregation.

September 16, 2025: The Texas Workforce Commission completed the settlement of a Fair Housing Act complaint against Community Capital Partners (CCP) citing the resolution of issues worded in the complaint and CCP's admission of no wrongdoing. CCP was then required to complete a program on fair housing training alongside the revision of marketing to better reflect non-discriminatory practices.

January 5, 2026: EPIC announced that they would be renaming the project to "The Meadows" and would be going forward with the development. The stated in a press release that they would allow for multiple places of worship "reflecting the community's open and inclusive design" and that they would be in "full compliance with all local, state, and federal laws".

February 15, 2026: The Department of Fair Housing and Urban Development's Office of Fair Housing and Equal Opportunity (FHEO) launches an investigation into CCP and EPIC Real Properties. Secretary Scott Turner of the Department of the Fair Housing and Urban Development (HUD) claimed that the investigation was to make sure that there wasn't any religious or national origin discrimination against applicants who wanted to live in the development and that the community would be "open to all Texans". HUD cited complaints from the Texas Workforce Commission that marketing material taken about The Meadow seemed to promote development of a Muslim exclusive community.

February 16, 2026: Attorney General Ken Paxton sued Double R Municipal Utility District No. 2A of Hunt and Collin Counties claiming that they committed actions to support EPIC's "illegal" development and evade oversight by the State of Texas.

== See also ==
- Islam in the Dallas–Fort Worth metroplex
- Holy Islamville, South Carolina – an all-Muslim intentional community
- Islamberg, New York – an all-Muslim intentional community
- New Square, New York − an all-Hasidic village
- Kaser, New York − an all-Hasidic village
- Kiryas Tosh, Quebec − an all-Hasidic community in Quebec, Canada
- Return to the Land
