= Merve Kavakcı =

Turkish academic, former politician

Merve Safa Kavakcı
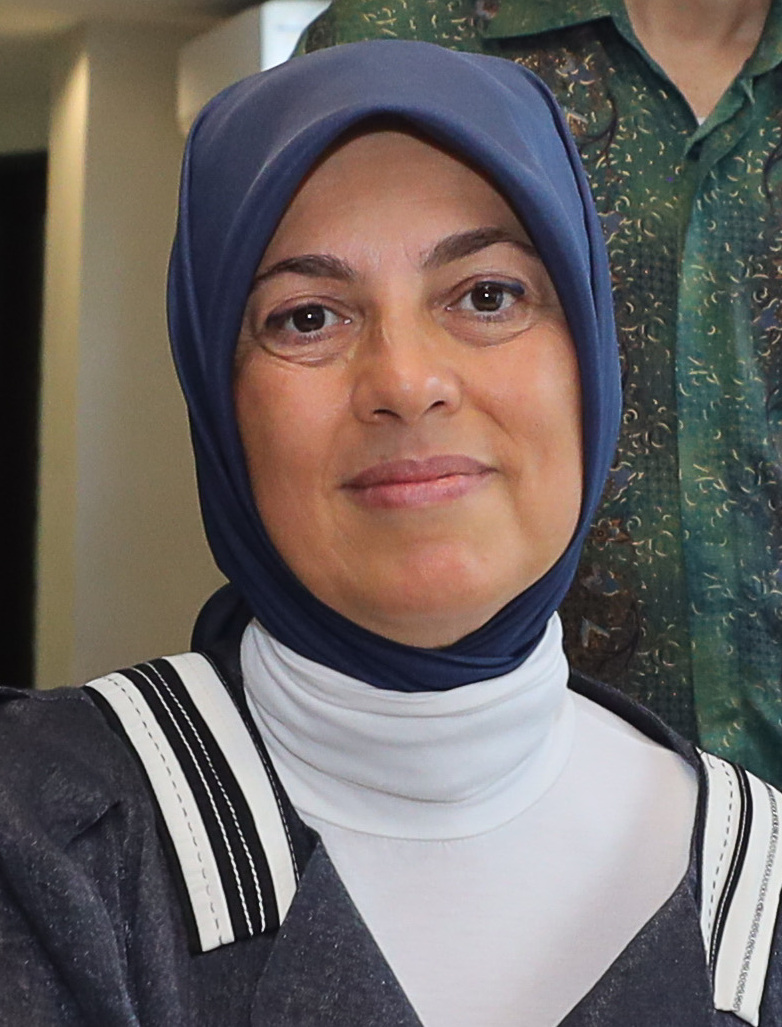
- Kavakcı in 2022
- Born: 19 August 1968 (age 58); Ankara, Turkey
- Education: M.Sc. from Harvard University; PhD from Howard University
- Occupations: Professor, ambassador
- Employer(s): Üsküdar University; George Washington University; Howard University; Ministry of Foreign Affairs (Turkey)
- Political party: Virtue Party (1998–2001)
- Father: Yusuf Ziya Kavakçı

Merve Safa Kavakcı (born 19 August 1968) is a Turkish politician who was elected to parliament as a Virtue Party deputy for Istanbul on 18 April 1999 but was never able to take office. She was ambassador to Malaysia from 4 December 2017 until 25 June 2022.

== Life and career ==
Kavakcı was born in Ankara on 19 August 1968, to Imam Yusuf Ziya Kavakçı. She is of Georgian descent through her father. Like her father, Kavakcı is a hafiza, someone who has memorised the entire Quran. She received her master's degree from Harvard University and her PhD from Howard University. Kavakcı is currently a professor at George Washington University and Howard University in Washington D.C.

On 2 May 1999, members of the Democratic Left Party (Turkish: Demokratik Sol Parti, DSP) prevented Kavakcı from taking her oath of office at the swearing-in ceremony because they objected to her wearing a headscarf. She had not disclosed her American citizenship which was discovered after the elections, and she lost her seat in the parliament in March 2001. The Virtue Party was closed down by the Constitutional Court in June 2001.

In 2007, Kavakcı won a legal case when the European Court of Human Rights found that her expulsion from parliament was a violation of her human rights. Since then, she has been an outspoken critic of Turkey's secular political system, traveling the globe in support of Muslim women's rights, especially the right to wear the hijab. In addition to lecturing at universities throughout Europe and the United States, Kavakcı addressed the 2004 Parliament of the World's Religions in Barcelona. She also addressed the House of Lords in London, England, and has lectured and spoken at myriad American and European Universities including Harvard, Yale, Berlin, Hamburg, Hanover, Duisburg and Cambridge.

Kavakcı has been listed as one of the World's 500 Most Influential Muslims. She was also recognised as a "Woman of Excellence" by the NAACP and GWU in 2004. She was awarded the Public Service Award in recognition of her efforts towards the advancement of human rights and Muslim Women's empowerment by the International Association for Women and Children in 2000. She was given a Service to Humanity Award by Haus Der Kulturellen Aktivität und Toleranz in Vienna, Austria, and was granted a Mother of the Year Award by Capital Platform of Ankara and the National Youth Organisation in 1999. She is a columnist for the conservative Turkish daily newspaper Vakit. She also sits on the editorial board of the Mediterranean Quarterly. Additionally, she is the author of six books and numerous articles.

She has two children, Fatima Abushanab and Mariam Kavakcı.

In 2012, a book entitled The Day Turkey Stood Still: Merve Kavakci's Walk Into the Parliament by Richard Peres was published.
