= Nouman Ali Khan =

American Islamic speaker (born 1978)

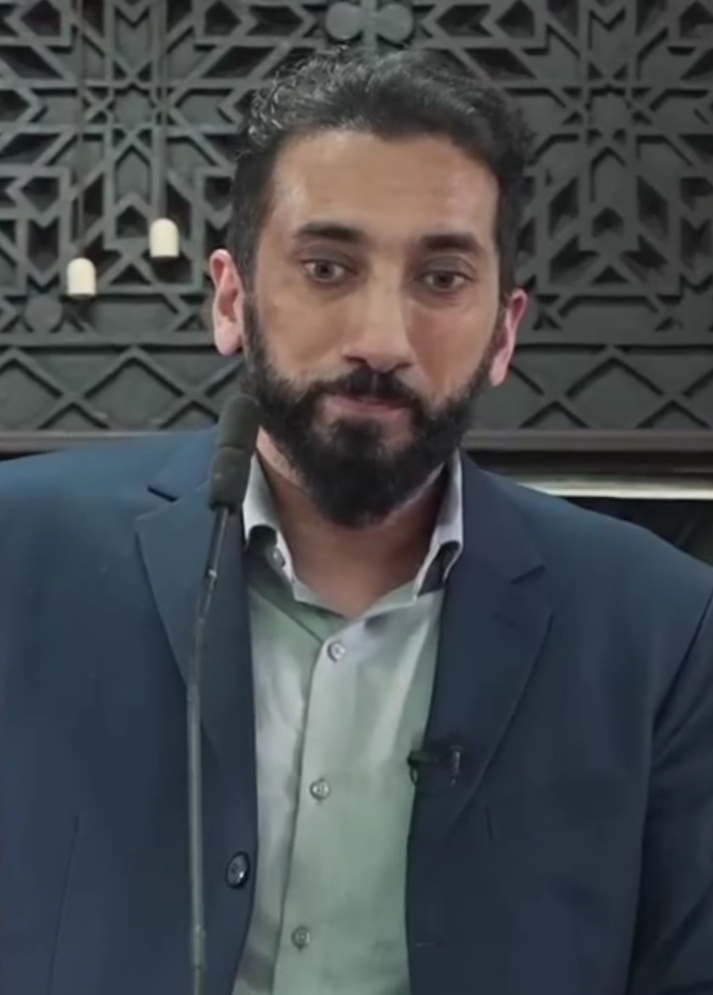
- Khan in 2023

Personal life
- Born: 1978 (age 47–48) East Berlin, East Germany
- Era: Contemporary
- Known for: Arabic; Quranic studies
- Occupation: Speaker, teacher

Religious life
- Religion: Islam
- Founder of: Bayyinah Institute

YouTube information
- Channel: Bayyinah Institute
- Years active: 2009–present
- Genre: Islamic
- Subscribers: 2.8 million
- Views: 326.7 million
- Last updated: 29 May 2026

Nouman Ali Khan (Urdu: نعمان علي خان; born 1978) is an American Islamic speaker and the founder of the Bayyinah Institute for Arabic and Qur'anic Studies, an Arabic institute based in Irving, Texas. Born in East Germany to a Pakistani family, he grew up in Saudi Arabia and New York and later taught Arabic at Nassau Community College before founding Bayyinah in 2006. He is known for lectures on the Quran and classical Arabic, which have attracted a wide online following, and has spoken extensively on the challenges facing Muslim communities in the United States.

In 2017, multiple women accused Khan of using his religious prominence to pursue inappropriate relationships, findings affirmed by two independent panels of Muslim clerics and academics. He has also faced criticism for discouraging the reporting of sexual abuse at a mosque where he served as board president.

== Personal life ==
Khan was born in 1978, in East Germany to a Pakistani Punjabi family and spent his preschool years in the former East Berlin. He later lived in Saudi Arabia, where he attended the Pakistan Embassy School from second through eighth grade, before moving to New York as a teenager. There he struggled with his faith, briefly identified as an atheist, and eventually became religious.

His return to Islam began when a fellow college student who offered him a ride stopped to pray; Khan joined him out of embarrassment and gratitude, and later began attending Taraweeh prayers during Ramadan. Nightly Quranic translation lectures delivered by visiting Pakistani scholar Dr. Abdus Samee proved a turning point, leading Khan to pursue classical Arabic in order to study the Quran in its original language.

He was previously married to Sofia Sharieff.

== Career ==
Before entering religious education, Khan worked in information technology, which he left to pursue Quranic studies full-time. He taught Arabic at Nassau Community College until 2006, after which he began working full-time on Bayyinah, a school for Arabic and Quranic studies. He has taught over 10,000 students via seminars and programs at Bayyinah. Khan chose the name "Bayyinah", an Arabic adjective meaning "that which is clear in itself", to reflect his goal of making the Quran directly comprehensible to Muslims. The Bayyinah Institute for Arabic and Qur'anic Studies is based in Irving, Texas, and operates without reliance on fundraising, with Khan describing it as financially self-sustaining through program fees.

Khan has spoken publicly about the challenges facing American Muslim communities, including the shortage of American-born imams. Having visited roughly 150 mosques across the country, he noted that most lacked a full-time imam and described Bayyinah's role in training future religious leaders to address that gap. He has also highlighted the generational challenge facing American mosques, noting that foreign-born imams may connect with older congregants but struggle to reach younger American-born Muslims.

He has described how American Muslim communities adapt Islamic social guidelines to an American context, including chaperoned co-ed field trips, girls-only dances during prom season, and gender-divided seminar spaces, while arguing that such practices are "unfairly assumed to mean that we're not social people and that we're not going to be successful in society." Khan has also argued that American Muslims, geographically separated from the broader Muslim world, must develop their own traditions and practices.

== Misconduct allegations and resignation from board ==
In early 2017, a panel of four Muslim clerics began investigating reports about Khan's conduct with women. Their written summary, obtained by BuzzFeed News, found that Khan had used his religious celebrity to groom female admirers into "secret sham marriages", relationships with no legal standing that in some cases "culminated in sex". According to the panel, Khan lied to the women about his marital status, sent sexually suggestive messages, and when confronted, attempted to buy their silence through financial payments or threatened them. Khan had agreed to cease public speaking and undergo counseling, but the panel found he broke the agreement, resumed speaking and contacting women, and had his attorney threaten lawsuits against the mediators.

The matter became public in September 2017 when Omer M. Mozaffar, a Muslim chaplain who had separately been mediating between Khan and his accusers, posted that Khan had "confessed inappropriate interactions with various women." A second panel of six Muslim clerics and academics conducted a separate inquiry and affirmed that Khan had "engaged in conduct unbecoming of any believer, much less someone who teaches about the Holy Qur'an," adding that they "unequivocally recognize and support survivors of abuse who are often silenced in our communities." Khan acknowledged contact with women but called the conversations "between consenting adults," saying he was seeking to remarry after his divorce. His attorney called the allegations "unfounded and clearly driven by a damaging motive."

The controversy prompted broader discussion within American Muslim communities about accountability for religious leaders. Ingrid Mattson, an Islamic studies professor and former president of the Islamic Society of North America who participated in one of the inquiries, noted that most Muslim institutions have "so little oversight of the religious leadership" and lack accessible mechanisms for reporting violations.

In 2018, a report by Facing Abuse in Community Environments found that Khan, while board president of the Islamic Center of Irving, had discouraged a woman from reporting sexual abuse by imam Zia Ul-Haq Sheikh, advising her to seek mental health services and warning that disclosure would harm Sheikh's reputation. Khan stepped down from the board shortly after Sheikh's resignation.

== Publications ==
Publications by Nouman Ali Khan
Title	Description	Date	Language
Divine Speech: Exploring Quran As Literature	Bayyinah Publishing	2016	English
Revive Your Heart: Putting Life in Perspective	Kube Publishing ISBN 978-0986275043	2017	English
Bondhon	Guardian Publication; 1st edition, ASIN: B07KV37PVR	2010	Bengali
Arabic With Husna	Multiple volumes ISBN 978-0986275043		English
Dirilt Kalbini	Timaş Yayınları ISBN 978-6050825992	2017	Turkish
Revive Your Heart	Guardian Publication	2019	Bengali
