= IANT Quranic Academy =

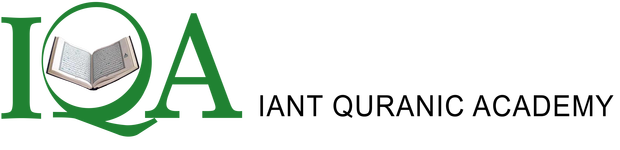

Location
- 840 Abrams Rd; Richardson, Texas 75081; United States
- 32.9395676°N 96.7307244°W

Information
- Type: Private
- Motto: IQA's mission is to develop the next generation of American Muslim scholars
- Established: 2002
- Founder: Islamic Association of North Texas
- Principal: Dr Hanan Almasri
- Faculty: 30
- Grades: K–12
- Gender: co-ed
- Enrollment: 250
- Website: Official Website

IANT Quranic Academy (IQA) is an Islamic private school in Richardson, Texas serving grades pre Kindergarten-12. It is a part of the Islamic Association of North Texas. The school was founded in 2002 with a Full Quran memorization, Hifz, Alim Studies (Islamic Scholar), and Academic program (pre K - 12 grade) in response to the needs of thousands of American Muslims residing in the city and neighboring cities such as Dallas, Garland, and Plano. It is one of the veteran Islamic schools in North Texas with 20 years of experience. 148 students graduated from IQA and 146 students became huffadh (memorized the Quran), and hundreds earned pre-alim diplomas.

== History ==
Dr. Yusuf Ziya Kavakci was the founder, teacher, and first principal of IANT Quranic Academy (IQA), the founding Dean, and instructor of Suffa Islamic Seminary, and the founder and president of the Islamic Tribunal. Since then, the school has grown to what it is today.

IQA offers financial aid for over 30 students every year since inception and planning to add scholarship program for Richardson and surrounding city residents.

The school was first accredited by cognia in 2007,5 years after it was established . This was a major achievement in the growth of the school.

The school also offers college preparatory courses in conjunction with Dallas County Community Colleges allowing students to earn college credit and even an associate degree by the time they graduate from high school.

== IQA today ==
IANT Quranic Academy is currently an accredited school by Cognia. IANT Quranic academy is a school participating in the TCSAAL (Texas Charter School Athletic Association League). The IQA High School Girls Volleyball team managed to go 4-0 in all of their games.
