= Islamic Center of Irving =

Mosque in the United States

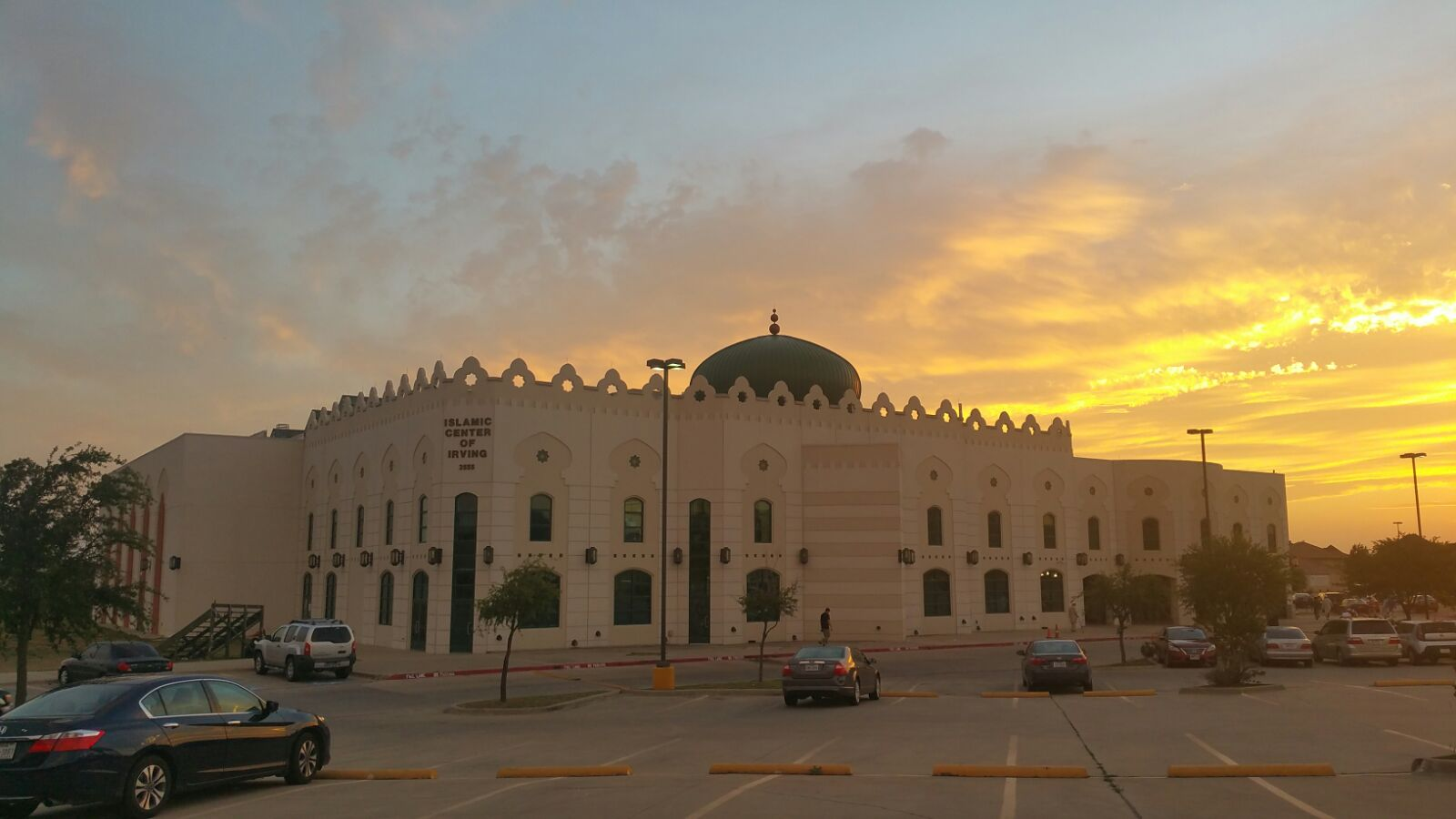

- Location in Texas Dallas

Religion
- Affiliation: Islam
- Branch/tradition: Sunni
- Ecclesiastical or organisational status: non-profit religious organization

Location
- Location: 2555 Esters Rd, Irving, TX 75062
- Coordinates: 32.8432°N 97.0106°W

Architecture
- Type: Mosque
- Established: 1991

Specifications
- Capacity: 2,500
- Dome: 1
- Minaret: 0

Website
- www.irvingmasjid.org

The Islamic Center of Irving (ICI) is a mosque and Islamic community center established and registered as a non-profit 501(c) organization in 1991 in Irving, Texas, USA.

== Purpose ==
Irving is located in the heart of the Dallas-Fort Worth Metroplex. It is estimated that there are 100,000 Muslims in DFW Metroplex. The center's goal is to serve the Muslim population by providing a Mosque, which is a place to pray, and Islamic School of Irving. It also provides Islamic activities to strengthen the Islamic community ties socially and religiously.

Its mission statement is to provide a central Islamic Center for all people in the Irving and DFW Area, utilizing all avenues for Dawah, while providing an Islamic Environment and Comprehensive Islamic Education to the next generation.

== History ==
The idea of establishing an Islamic center originated in the early 1980s when a group of Muslims started praying the five daily and the Jumu'ah (Friday) prayers together in one of their own houses. Soon they had to move to a bigger place, from one apartment to another until they could rent an apartment and use it as a Mosque where they performed all their prayers. The number of people praying continued to increase which required them to find a bigger place. In 1990, the group rented a house that could accommodate about 75 people to use as the Mosque.

Not too long afterwards, the number of people praying exceeded 75, and some had to pray outside the house. A school for the children was held each weekend but had to close eight months later because the place was unsuitable for studying.

For many years the group had to move from one place to another, renting halls for the Friday prayers as the number of people praying reached between 200 and 300 men and there was no place for women. Muslims in the group were prevented from praying in some of the halls.

== Current building ==
The building on 2555 N Esters Road is fully functional and it has a regular 5 times prayer in the masjid and a youth group to play basketball on their 2 full basketball courts. It can accommodate about 3000 worshipers for the weekly Jumu'ah prayer in 2 sessions. It also supports the Islamic School of Irving, Sunday and Summer school, marriage Services, funeral services, Quranic and Arabic Teachings, and even Sunday tours for the public to learn more about Islam.

== Controversies ==
=== 2017: Zia ul-Haq Sheikh sexual misconduct case ===
In 2018, a woman sued former Islamic Center of Irving (ICI) imam Zia ul-Haq Sheikh, alleging that he had groomed and sexually exploited her after beginning to counsel her at age 13. Sheikh denied the allegations. In 2019, a Dallas County judge ordered him to pay approximately $2.55 million in damages and legal fees. According to an investigation by Facing Abuse in Community Environments (FACE), the woman had previously disclosed the alleged abuse to Nouman Ali Khan, then president of ICI's board, who discouraged her from publicizing it because of the potential harm to Sheikh's reputation. Khan disputed FACE's characterization of his involvement.

=== 2018: Child-safety and reporting controversy ===
ICI faced criticism over its response to reports of inappropriate physical contact between an elderly congregant and two minors. Imam Nicholas ("Nick") Pelletier reported the matter to police and publicly criticized ICI's handling of suspected child abuse, as ICI allowed the perpetrator to leave the United States. ICI disputed his characterization of the incidents and subsequently placed him on administrative leave. Irving Police Chief Jeff Spivey later addressed the congregation about reporting suspected child abuse, and ICI announced changes to its reporting procedures and training.

=== 2019: Syed Humzah Hashmi child sexual assault case ===
In 2019, ICI security guard Syed Humzah Hashmi was arrested after a boy who attended the Islamic School of Irving reported being sexually assaulted by him. Hashmi was subsequently convicted of aggravated sexual assault of a child and child-pornography offenses and received a 20-year sentence for the sexual-assault conviction.

=== 2024–2026: Islamic School of Irving lawsuit ===
In August 2026, a civil lawsuit alleged that a janitor had been raped on the Islamic School of Irving campus in September 2024 by a 14-year-old former student and that school personnel failed to contact police after the assault was reported. The lawsuit seeks more than $1 million and names ICI among the defendants. The allegations remain pending and have not resulted in a finding of liability.

== See also ==
- List of mosques in the Americas
- Lists of mosques
- List of mosques in the United States
