= Residential segregation =

Residential segregation is a concept in urban sociology which refers to the voluntary or forced spatial separation of different socio-cultural, ethnic, or racial groups within residential areas. It is often associated with immigration, wealth inequality, or prejudice. The term is most often used in relation to residential segregation in the United States.

== See also ==
- Ethnic enclave
