= Islamic Association of North Texas =

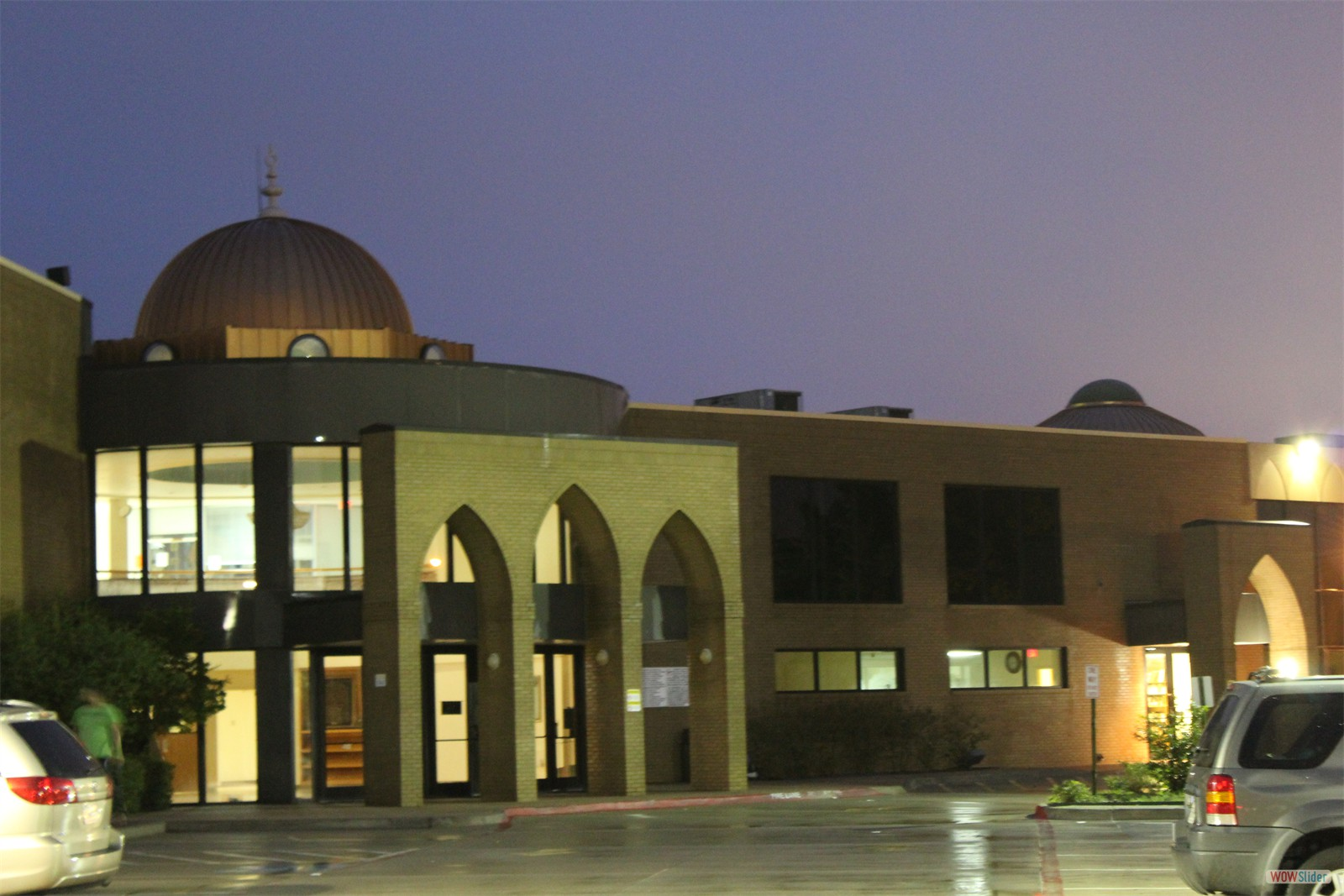

- Location in Texas

Religion
- Affiliation: Islam
- Branch/tradition: Sunni
- Ecclesiastical or organizational status: non-profit religious organization
- Leadership: Dr. Asif Hirani (Resident Scholar)

Location
- Location: 840 Abrams Rd., Richardson 75081
- Interactive map of Islamic Association of North Texas
- Coordinates: 32.9395676°N 96.7307244°W

Architecture
- Type: Mosque
- Established: 1969

Specifications
- Capacity: 2,000+
- Dome: 2
- Minaret: 1

Website
- iant.com

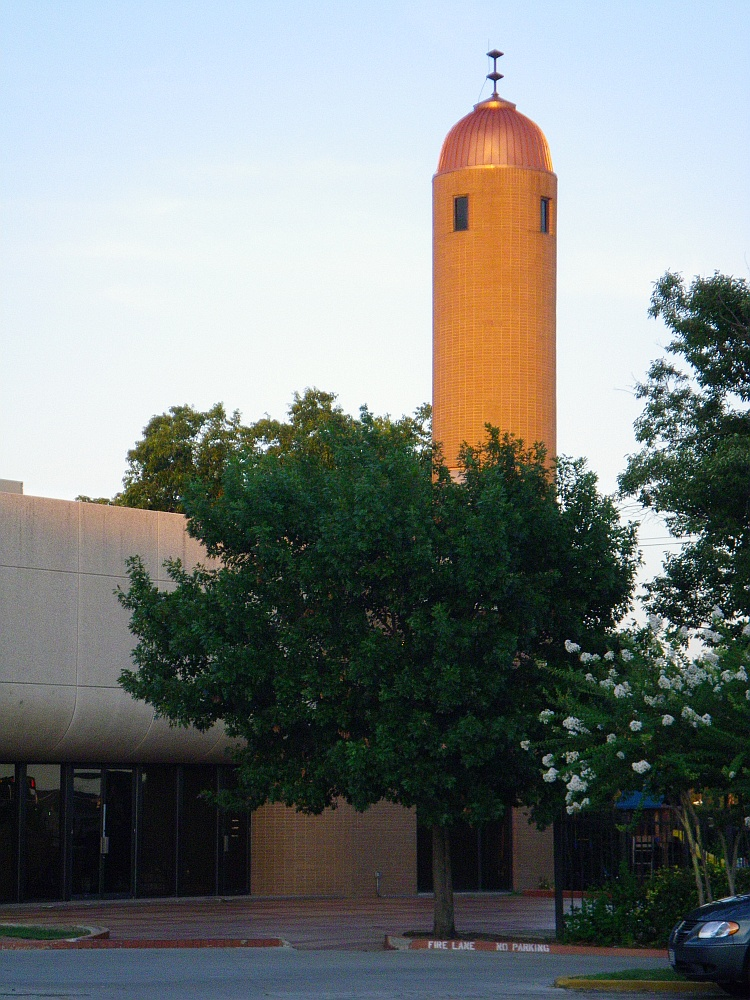
The minaret at the IANT

The Islamic Association of North Texas (IANT) is a non-profit organization of Muslims dedicated to worship, education, and community service in Richardson, Texas. IANT provides many services to the North Texas community in the Dallas-Fort Worth Metroplex. In addition to religious services such as the five daily prayers, weekly Friday sermons, Taraweeh prayers, community Iftars, Eid prayers, marriage ceremonies, counseling services, and Dawah work, IANT also provides several other educational and community services.

IANT is also the mother-organization of the IANT Quranic Academy (IQA), Suffa Islamic Seminary (SIS), IANT Youth, and IANT Sports.

== History ==
IANT was established in 1969 and was incorporated in the state of Texas as a non-profit, tax exempt, and religious organization. The initial founding group consisted of six Muslim families and some students, which rotated between each other's homes as Masjids. As the Muslim community in the Dallas area grew, it was decided to purchase three frame houses on Bagdad Road in Grand Prairie, Texas, which became the headquarters of IANT. However, the region proved inadequate because most newly arriving families preferred the Richardson/Garland area which was in a closer proximity to the city of Dallas and provided better school districts and the need for larger premises became a necessity.

In 1979, IANT purchased a large frame house with a barn on Abrams Road in Richardson. On October 30, 1982, a big ceremony took place and the fundraising for the new Mosque began. In 1983, the Restland Cemetery, which is in close proximity to IANT, was secured for Muslim burial needs. Eventually, in 1985, the city of Richardson granted a final occupancy permit. During that month and Inauguration Ceremony was held.

As the community grew larger, a surprise visitor stopped by the Masjid. The world-famous boxer Muhammad Ali joined for afternoon prayers and the socialized with everyone present. During the ensuing years, the community grew exponentially and forced the administration to embark a big expansion project with a larger prayer hall, better facilities for the ladies, a body preparation facility (which is used for funerals), a multi-purpose hall for conferences and other social activities such as exhibitions and games. A medical clinic with certified doctors was also established.

During this period of changes, the community around the association grew so large, that Dr. Yusuf Ziya Kavakci, a well known Turkish scholar who served as the Imam of the Masjid at that time, initiated the IQA Quranic Academy, with the goal of generating scholars of the future to serve the entire nation. Another project by Dr. Kavakci was the Suffa Islamic Seminary, where students could learn and share their Islamic heritage and culture.

After pursue of the youth of the community, the IANT Youth program was introduced in 2010, followed by the IANT sports program in 2012. These and many different projects and expansions have made the IANT the largest Muslim community in the state of Texas.

== Services Offered ==
Prayers

- Five daily prayers
- Jumua (Friday) prayers
- Taraweeh and Eid prayers
- Janaza (Funeral) prayers

Education/Outreach

- Dawah
- Two Quranic School programs with daily and Sunday Schedules
- Speakers for churches, prisons, schools, universities, and other institutions
- Library facility in the masjid for Islamic research
- Outreach programs for new Muslims and non-Muslims

Other

- Distribution of Zakat and Fitra
- Library facility in the masjid for Islamic research
- Medical Clinic (for Muslims & non-Muslims)
- Family and marriage counseling services
- Multipurpose Hall for recreational and community purposes
- Ghusl (washing of the deceased) facility at the Masjid

== See also ==
- List of mosques in the Americas
- Lists of mosques
- List of mosques in the United States
