= Return to the Land =

White separatist group

Coordinates: 36°16′25.4″N 91°16′49.3″W

- Founded: September 2023
- Headquarters: Northern Arkansas, U.S.
- Leader: Eric Orwoll
- Website: returntotheland.org

Return to the Land (RTTL) is a white-separatist private membership association with members in the United States and Canada. The goal of the association is the establishment of exclusively White intentional communities, the first such community established in northern Arkansas, United States in 2023, with a second location established nearby in the Ozarks in early 2025.

As of December 2025, there were four branches in the Western United States, five in the Eastern United States, and one branch in Canada, each seeking to establish similar communities in their respective regions.

== History ==
The organization, operating under the name Wisdom Woods LLC, owns over 160 acres (65 ha) near Ravenden, Arkansas. Co-founded by Eric Orwoll and Peter Csere in 2023, the community advertises itself as exclusively for White people. The membership application process includes interviews and background checks, whereby candidates are vetted for European heritage. Jews are not considered white by RTTL and thus are barred from admission.

As of 2025 the two active communities are: Arkansas Ozarks Community I and Arkansas Ozarks Community II. Four more are planned: one more in the Ozarks, one in the Deep South, and two in Appalachia. As of July 2025, the first community is home to 40 inhabitants.

== Founders ==
=== Eric Orwoll ===
Eric Orwoll (who also uses the pseudonym Aarvoll) is the founder and spokesperson of Return to the Land. He is active on social media, mainly YouTube and X, discussing religion, politics, philosophy, Platonism, and white identitarianism. He has hosted discussions with other white identitarians, including Nick Fuentes. Additionally, he has discussed how he was inspired by Orania, the Afrikaner separatist project. Orwoll says that he has been a musician for Shen Yun, promoted by The Epoch Times, a far-right media outlet affiliated with Falun Gong.

Orwoll has characterized public opinion on Adolf Hitler as "one-sided", and has predicted a "second coming" of a Hitler-like leader, "who is going to advocate for your interests because that's how a lot of people see Hitler". Orwoll grew up in La Mirada, outside Los Angeles, and studied French horn at the Eastman School of Music in Rochester, New York. On his YouTube channel, he has posted videos about Plato and collective consciousness. He has a strong interest in Greek philosophy. Orwoll voted for Donald Trump in the 2024 United States presidential election, but he says that he did so only because he considered the prospect of a Kamala Harris administration worse.

In describing the goals of the association, Eric Orwoll stated “It’s not a supremacist group. It’s not a hate group. It’s not even a white nationalist group,” he said. “We are white identitarians. We value our identity and want to preserve it. That’s not hate. That is love for your own people.” Both Democratic and Republican leaders in the states RTTL operates have heavily criticized the group.

=== Peter Csere ===
Csere is described as the organization's "de facto number two", responsible for the organization's legal framework. In the group's Telegram chat, Csere posted the phrase "1488", referring to the "Fourteen Words", a white-identitarian slogan, with 88 representing the phrase "Heil Hitler". Csere previously lived in Ecuador, where he co-founded the ecovillages of Fruit Haven and Terra Frutis. In Ecuador, Csere was arrested for stabbing a miner. He has not been formally charged, and claims that he was acting in self defense. On February 28, 2025, Fruit Haven ecovillage published an announcement on its website alleging that Csere had misappropriated funds and stolen cryptocurrency from the community.

==== Breach of Contract Lawsuit Filed Against Csere ====
At the start of 2026, California educator John MacDonald launched a lawsuit in Sharp County Circuit Court against Csere and the RTTL organization. The complaint alleges that over a nearly two-year window, Csere accepted real estate payments from MacDonald without ever filing the necessary documentation to legally finalize the property transfer. MacDonald, who is requesting a jury trial, wants a full refund of his capital alongside legal expenses. Speaking with the Arkansas Times, MacDonald explained that while Csere claimed to be too preoccupied to finalize the legal paperwork, he kept the funds anyway.

The financial arrangement spanned from May 2022 to March 2024, during which MacDonald submitted recurring monthly installments for the land. His total out-of-pocket loss exceeded $15,000 in direct payments and closing fees to Csere - who operated via Global Homestead Solutions LLC- even after accounting for roughly $4,200 spent on travel and building materials. Global Homestead Solutions is one of four corporate entities named in the suit, all tied directly to Csere as the registered agent.

The deal permanently unraveled in November 2025 when Csere sent an email admitting he was unable to fulfill the property's closing mandates. Public allegations later surfaced on the Fruit Haven website suggesting MacDonald wasn't alone, accusing Csere of systematically mishandling land payments from multiple buyers. This prompted MacDonald's January 5 legal filing in Sharp County, where Csere’s Return to the Land operations are based. Although MacDonald extended an offer to settle the dispute out of court after the summons was delivered, Csere declined to negotiate.

== Securities fraud allegations ==
According to the Arkansas Times, a regulatory complaint submitted to the Arkansas Securities Department accuses the organization of financial fraud. The filing, which was officially logged on September 12, asserts that Return to the Land and its executive leadership are conducting the unauthorized, widespread marketing and distribution of unregistered securities to prospective members, breaching state financial statutes.

The document outlined extensive evidence indicating that the directors of Return to the Land - who operate through a network of four distinct limited liability companies - are misrepresenting LLC membership stakes by marketing them as traditional property deeds. This deceptive practice allegedly leaves unsuspecting buyers exposed to severe economic vulnerabilities. According to the filing, these assets qualify as unregistered securities, meaning they are investment instruments acquired by participants to generate revenue for the organization but have bypassed mandatory registration and oversight with the Securities and Exchange Commission (SEC).

=== Allegations of animal cruelty, practicing without a license, and past criminal conduct in Ecuador ===
As reported by Arkansas Times, prior to his operations in Arkansas, Csere faced severe accusations from members of his former vegan community in Ecuador, who alleged he was involved in animal abuse, physical assault, and attempted murder. Nik Frost, representing a group of 40 property owners at the Fruit Haven eco-village working to repair their community's reputation, claimed that Csere misappropriated roughly $30,000 from a shared land fund over seven years, alongside an additional $30,000 in cryptocurrency. Frost further stated that despite lacking professional credentials, Csere routinely practiced without a license, advising residents to ignore certified legal, medical, and financial professionals in favor of his own guidance.

The interpersonal friction escalated into documented confrontations, including a late-2021 property dispute with an elderly resident, Malcolm Hathorne, which was captured on video and uploaded online. Frost also leveled specific allegations of animal cruelty against Csere, accusing him of poisoning his 11-year-old Samoyed, Tofu.

The most severe accusations from the Fruit Haven community stem from a violent clash with the Shuar Nation, an indigenous Amazonian tribe, over a gold-panning dispute on land the tribe claims as ancestral territory. Frost noted that during this period, Csere adopted military-style attire and grew increasingly hostile toward locals. While Csere acknowledged his involvement in a stabbing during the altercation, he maintained he acted purely in self-defense. Following the incident, he left Fruit Haven in 2023. The eco-village maintains a public warning on its website, advising extreme caution regarding Csere due to his documented history of financial misconduct and volatile disputes.

== Reactions ==
The organization has been criticized by Arkansas Attorney General Tim Griffin, although Griffin's office has indicated that it has "not seen anything that would indicate any state or federal laws have been broken". The Anti-Defamation League, an advocacy group for combating antisemitism, has described the organization as illegal under the Arkansas Fair Housing Act and the Fair Housing Act of 1968.

The organization's attempts to expand into Missouri have been met with backlash from Democratic Communications Director Chelsea Rodriguez and Missouri state representatives Jeremy Dean and Betsy Fogle, who jointly stated that the group would not be welcome in their state.

On May 20, 2026, a lawsuit against the developers of Return to the Land was jointly filed by the NAACP Legal Defense Fund, Washington D.C.–based law firm Relman Colfax PLLC, and Legal Aid of Arkansas. The lawsuit, filed on behalf of Michelle Walker, seeks to stop the organization's "discriminatory housing practices" and to "obtain relief for violations of the Fair Housing Act, the Civil Rights Act of 1866, 1981, 1982, and 1985, the Arkansas Fair Housing Act, and the Arkansas Civil Rights Act of 1993."

The press release for the announcement of Walker v. Return to the Land, et al. asserts that RTTL is a "white separatist organization attempting to create an all-white nation within the United States by building smaller settlements that exclude anyone who isn't a white, Christian, heterosexual homebuyer". The document additionally claims that the organization's founders "believe white people are genetically superior to all other races" and "advance the view that Jewish people are engaged in a plot to eliminate the white race."

== See also ==
- Elohim City, Oklahoma
- Kiryas Joel, New York
- Leith, North Dakota
- Orania
- Separatism
- Sundown town
- White ethnostate
- White flight
