= List of American Muslims =

This is an incomplete list of notable Muslims who live or lived in the United States.

== Academia ==
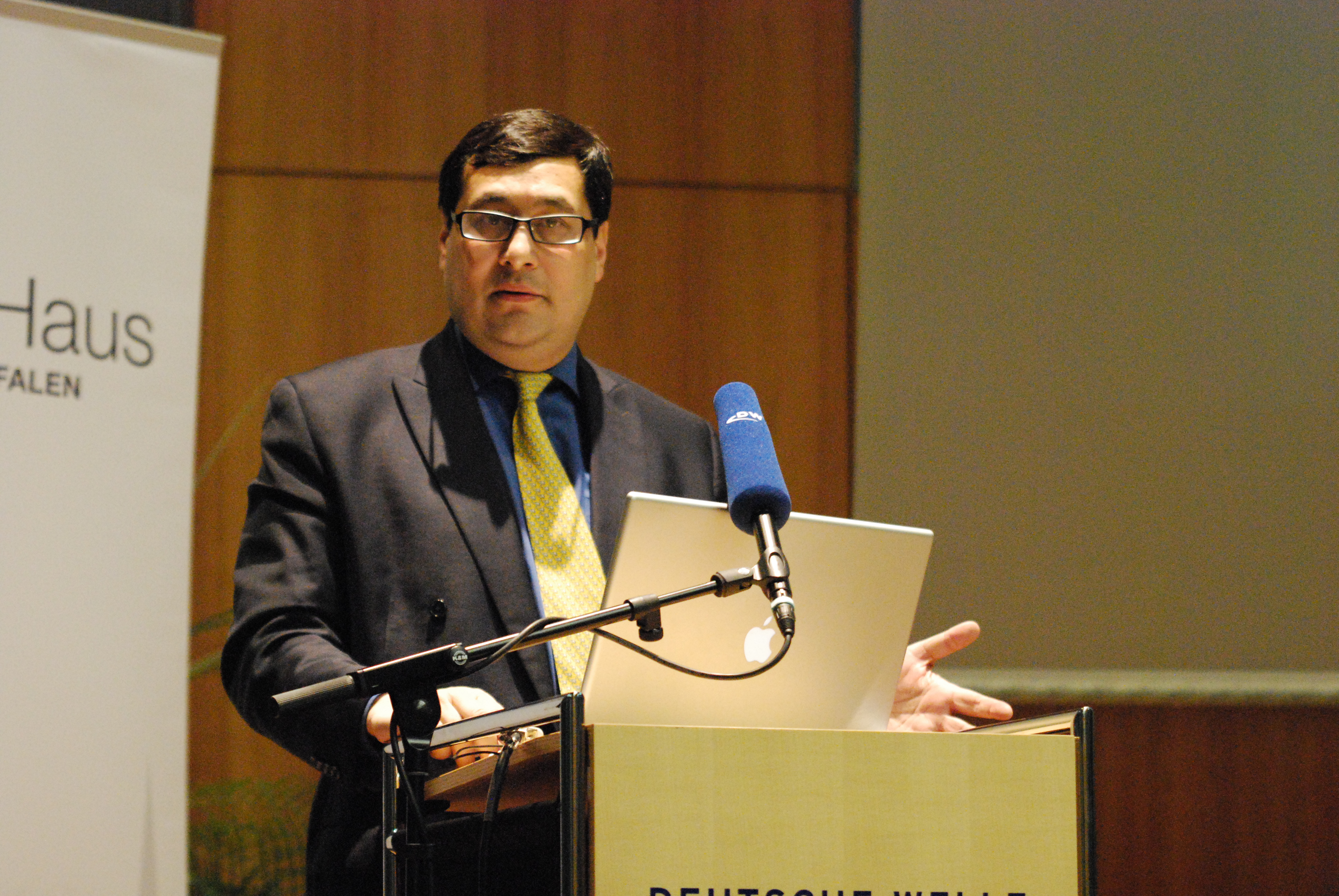
Adil Najam during a talk at Deutsche Welle Building in Bonn, Germany on January 21, 2010

- Asad Abidi – Professor of Electrical Engineering at the University of California, Los Angeles; member of the National Academy of Engineering
- Amjad Masad – Founder and CEO of Replit
- Gul Agha – Professor of Computer Science at the University of Illinois at Urbana-Champaign
- Akbar S. Ahmed – US resident Pakistani anthropologist; the Ibn Khaldun Chair of Islamic Studies at American University; producer of the film Journey Into Europe, on Islam in Europe
- Saleem H. Ali – environmental researcher and Associate Dean for Graduate studies at the University of Vermont's Rubenstein School of Environment and Natural Resources; writer and contributor to publications such as the International Herald Tribune; has dual American and Pakistani citizenship
- Talal Asad – Professor of Anthropology and Religious Studies at CUNY
- Farooq Azam – Distinguished Professor at Scripps Institution of Oceanography, UCSD; researcher in the field of marine microbiology
- Ayesha Jalal – MacArthur Fellow and Richardson Professor of History at Tufts University
- Mohammad Aslam Khan Khalil – Professor of Physics at Portland State University; a highly cited researcher in the field of atmospheric physics
- Sadaf Jaffer – the first female Muslim American mayor, first female South Asian mayor, and first female Pakistani-American mayor in the United States, of Montgomery in Somerset County, New Jersey.
- Hafeez Malik – Professor of Political Science at Villanova University, in Pennsylvania
- Zia Mian – physicist
- Adil Najam – Professor of Geography and International Relations and Director of the Pardee Center at Boston University; founding editor of popular blog Pakistaniat
- S. Hamid Nawab, Professor of Electrical and Computer Engineering and Biomedical Engineering, Boston University; co-author of widely used textbook Signals and Systems (1997), published by Prentice Hall (Pearson); researcher in signal processing and machine perception with application to auditory, speech, and neuromuscular systems
- Anwar Shaikh – Professor of Economics at the graduate faculty of The New School in New York City
- Sara Suleri – Professor of English at Yale University
- Abdul Jamil Tajik – researcher in clinical medicine
- Muhammad Suhail Zubairy – Professor in the Department of Physics and Astronomy; holder of the Munnerlyn-Heep Chair in Quantum Optics at the Texas A&M University

== Activism and government ==
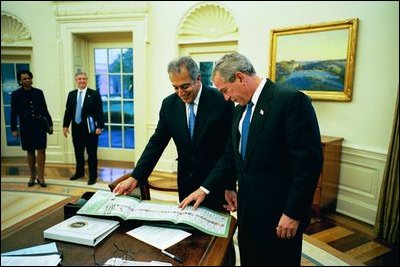
Former UN ambassador Zalmay Khalilzad with President George W. Bush at the White House

- Huma Abedin – Aide to United States Secretary of State Hillary Clinton; served as traveling chief of staff during Clinton's campaign for the Democratic nomination in the 2008 presidential election
- Saqib Ali – Served as delegate to the Maryland House of Delegates, elected in 2006, represented the 39th District
- Tahir Ali – First Pakistani American elected as a National delegate-at-large (R) from Massachusetts, 1992
- Aisha al-Adawiya – American interfaith activist and founder of Women in Islam
- Nihad Awad – National Executive Director of the Council on American-Islamic Relations
- André Carson – Congressman from Indiana
- Shamila N. Chaudhary – US government policy adviser
- Nusrat Jahudhury - Civil rights lawyer and District Court judge for the Eastern District of New York. First Muslim woman to serve as a United States federal judge.
- Robert D. Crane – Former foreign policy advisor; author
- Sada Cumber – First US envoy to the Organisation of the Islamic Conference
- Hamida Dakane – First Black and first Muslim to serve in the North Dakota House of Representatives
- Keith Ellison – First Muslim congressman from Minnesota
- Louis Farrakhan – Leader of the Nation of Islam
- George Bethune English (1787–1828) – American adventurer, diplomat, soldier, and convert to Islam.
- Ghazala Hashmi – Lieutenant Governor of Virginia and first Muslim woman elected to a statewide office in the United States
- Ibrahim Hooper – National Communications Director for the Council on American-Islamic Relations (CAIR)
- Mansoor Ijaz – Hedge fund manager and venture capitalist involved in Pakistan–United States relations and peace efforts surrounding the Kashmir conflict
- Arsalan Iftikhar – Human rights lawyer, global media commentator, and author of the book Scapegoats: How Islamophobia Helps Our Enemies & Threatens Our Freedoms
- Noor Al-Hussein – Anti-nuclear weapons proliferation advocate and former Queen consort of Jordan
- Hakim Jamal – Civil rights activist; Member of the Nation of Islam but converted to traditional Islam after the assassination of his cousin Malcolm X.
- Mustafa T. Kasubhai – First Muslim federal judge in the United States
- Zalmay Khalilzad – Former US Ambassador to the United Nations; former U.S. Ambassador to Iraq and Afghanistan
- Yuri Kochiyama – Japanese American activist who converted to Sunni Islam from Protestantism in 1971
- Edina Lekovic – Communications Director of the Muslim Public Affairs Council
- Zohran Mamdani – First Muslim elected Mayor of New York City
- Ilhan Omar – One of the first two Muslim women elected to Congress.
- Farah Pandith – Special Representative to Muslim Communities for the US Department of State; official advisor to President Obama on Muslim matters
- Zaraishi – First Muslim Article III district court judge in the United States
- Zainab Salbi – Co-founder and president for Women for Women International
- Betty Shabazz (also known as Betty X) – Civil rights activist and educator; widow of Malcolm X
- Ilyasah Shabazz – Social activist and daughter of Malcolm X
- Malcolm Shabazz – Activist and grandson of Malcolm X; Murdered during a labor rights tour in Mexico
- el-Hajj Malik el-Shabazz (also known as Malcolm X) – Human rights activist, civil rights activist, public speaker and Black Muslim minister; Joined the Nation of Islam in 1952, before converting to Sunni Islam in 1964.
- Azadeh Shahshahani – Human rights attorney and past president of the National Lawyers Guild
- Saghir "Saggy" Tahir – New Hampshire State Representative; the only elected Pakistani American in the Republican Party; re-elected in 2006 for a fourth term to represent Ward 2, District 9 in his home town of Manchester
- Shirin R. Tahir-Kheli – White House appointee at various senior posts in the executive branch and the State department during five Republican administrations.
- Rashida Tlaib – One of the first two Muslim women elected to Congress.
- James Yee – Former U.S. Army chaplain with the rank of Captain
- Elias Zerhouni – Director, National Institutes of Health
- Haz Al-Din – American Communist Party chairman
- Bushra Amiwala – Skokie, Illinois board of education member
- Darializa Avila Chevalier – U.S. Representative-elect for New York's 13th congressional district
- Abdul El-Sayed – United States senator-elect from Michigan
- Nabeela Syed – Illinois House of Representatives representative from the 51st district
- Aisha Wahab – Representative from California's 14th Congressional district
- Aber Kawas – State senator-elect from New York's 12th State Senate district

== Armed forces ==
- Kareem Rashad Sultan Khan – United States Army Soldier killed in Iraq
- Humayun Khan – United States Army Soldier killed in Iraq

=== Foreign military service ===
- Ma Dunjing – Chinese Muslim General of the National Revolutionary Army, immigrated to Los Angeles in the United States after retirement in 1950
- Ma Hongkui – Chinese Muslim General of the National Revolutionary Army, immigrated to Los Angeles in the United States after retirement in 1950

== Art ==
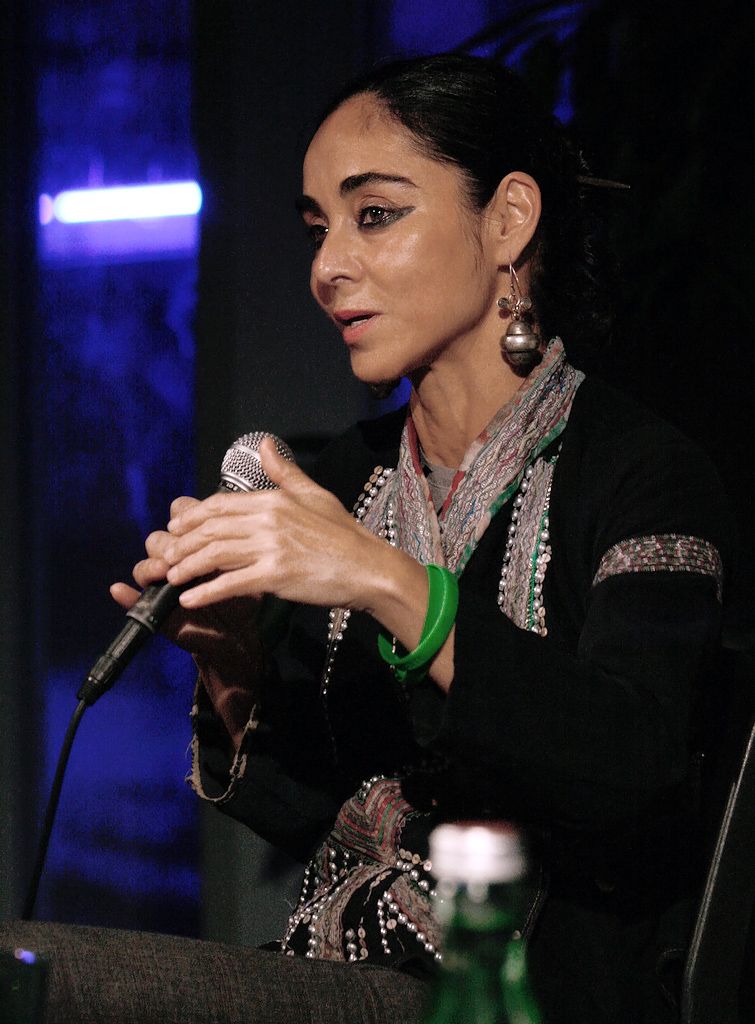
Artist Shirin Neshat at the Viennale 2009

- Kameelah Janan Rasheed – Artist based in New York City
- Deana Haggag – Egyptian-American art museum curator, President and CEO of United States Artists in Chicago
- Shirin Neshat – Iranian-American visual artist and film director. Awarded The Dorothy and Lillian Gish Prize in 2006, and the Silver Lion in 2009
- Shahzia Sikander – Pakistani-American artist and MacArthur Fellow
- Minoosh Zomorodinia – Iranian-born American visual artist and curator

== Business ==
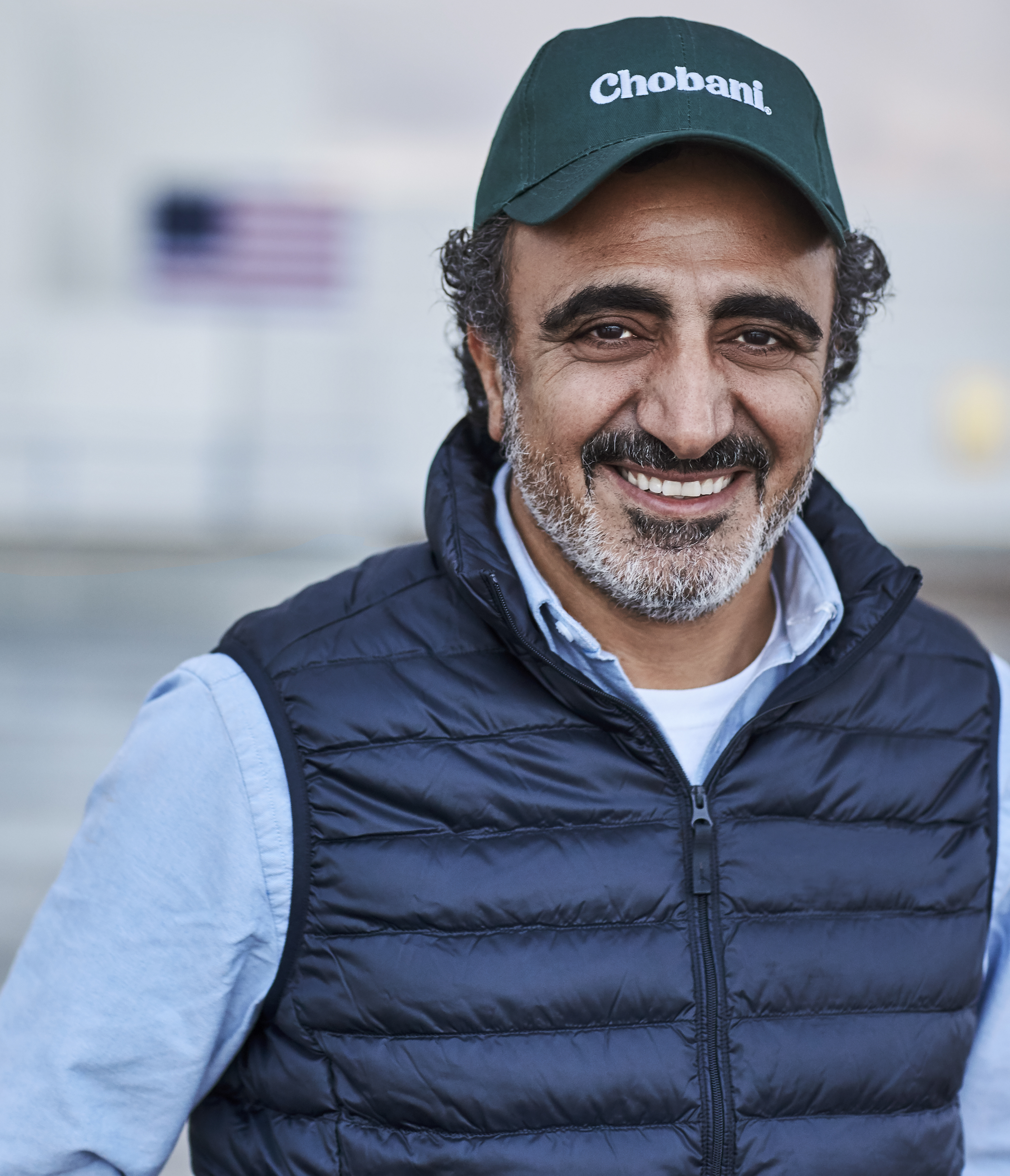
Billionaire Chobani CEO, philanthropist and activist Hamdi Ulukaya

- Javed Ahmed – former chief executive of Tate & Lyle, a FTSE 250 company and one of Britain's oldest brands
- Michael Chowdry (1955–2001) – Forbes 400 businessman; founder of air cargo company Atlas Air, which in 2001 was worth over $1.39 billion
- Mohamed El-Erian – chief economic adviser of Allianz, the parent company of PIMCO, where El-Erian was CEO and manager of over $1 trillion in global assets; president of Queens' College, Cambridge
- Tariq Farid – founder and chief executive of Edible Arrangements
- Nabeel Gareeb – president and chief executive of renewable energy company MEMC (now SunEdison) from 2002 to 2008; ranked 6th highest-earning U.S. CEO in 2008
- Fred Hassan – chairman of investment company Caret Group, director of private equity firm Warburg Pincus, former chief executive of pharmaceutical companies including Schering-Plough from 2003 to 2009, when the company completed its merger with Merck & Co.
- Mansoor Ijaz – founder and chairman of Crescent Investment Management, television commentator
- Jawed Karim – co-founder of YouTube
- Farooq Kathwari – chairman, president and chief executive of Ethan Allen
- Shahid Khan – owner of sports teams the Jacksonville Jaguars and Fulham F.C., and autoparts maker Flex-N-Gate, lead investor in All Elite Wrestling
- Safi Qureshey – co-founder and former CEO of AST Research, philanthropist
- Hamdi Ulukaya – billionaire founder and chief executive of foods maker Chobani; activist and philanthropist, signed the Giving Pledge to donate the majority of his wealth, founded the Tent Foundation, received the UN Global Leadership Award and the Global Citizen Prize

== Comedy ==
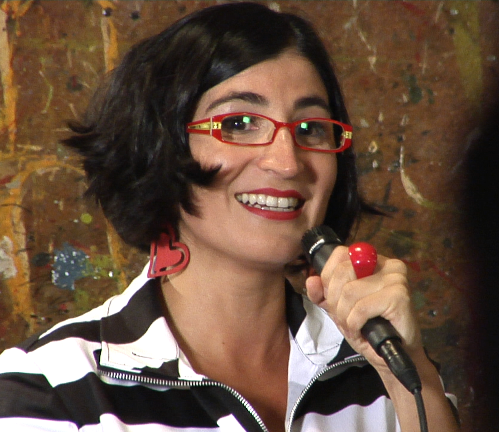
Comedian Negin Farsad

- Ahmed Ahmed – standup comedian, actor
- Mohammed Amer – standup comedian
- Dave Chappelle – standup comedian (converted in 1998)
- Negin Farsad – comedian, actress, writer, filmmaker
- Maz Jobrani – standup comedian, actor
- Aasif Mandvi – comedian, actor
- Hasan Minhaj – comedian, Daily Show correspondent
- Preacher Moss – standup comedian, comedy writer
- Zahra Noorbakhsh – comedian, writer, actor, co-host of #GoodMuslimBadMuslim podcast
- Dean Obeidallah – standup comedian
- Azhar Usman – standup comedian
- Maysoon Zayid – standup comedian, actress

== Crime ==
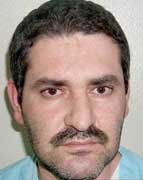
An undated mugshot of Mir Aimal Kansi on death row

- Hasan Akbar – convicted of premeditated murder in a grenade attack on fellow soldiers
- Hesham Mohamed Hadayet – Egyptian-American who killed 2 people at the El Al counter at Los Angeles International Airport
- Wadih el-Hage – al-Qaeda member serving life imprisonment in the US for his part in the 1998 United States embassy bombings
- Mujahid Abdul Halim – Served 45 years in prison for taking part in the assassination of Malcolm X; Long-time member of the Nation of Islam but converted to traditional Islam while in prison.
- Nidal Hasan – former soldier convicted of the 2009 Fort Hood shooting
- Muzzammil Hassan – founder of Bridges TV, a Muslim television network; received sentence of 25 to life for killing his wife
- Mir Aimal Kansi – Pakistani-American convicted and executed for the shootings at the Central Intelligence Agency headquarters
- John Walker Lindh – member of the Taliban
- John Allen Muhammad – executed beltway sniper
- José Padilla – convicted of aiding terrorists and litigant before the United States Supreme Court in Rumsfeld v. Padilla
- Dzhokhar Tsarnaev – Kyrgyzstani-American citizen who was convicted of planting bombs at the Boston Marathon on April 15, 2013, together with his brother Tamerlan Tsarnaev.
- Bryant Neal Vinas – convicted of participating in and supporting al-Qaeda plots in Afghanistan and the U.S.

== Film ==
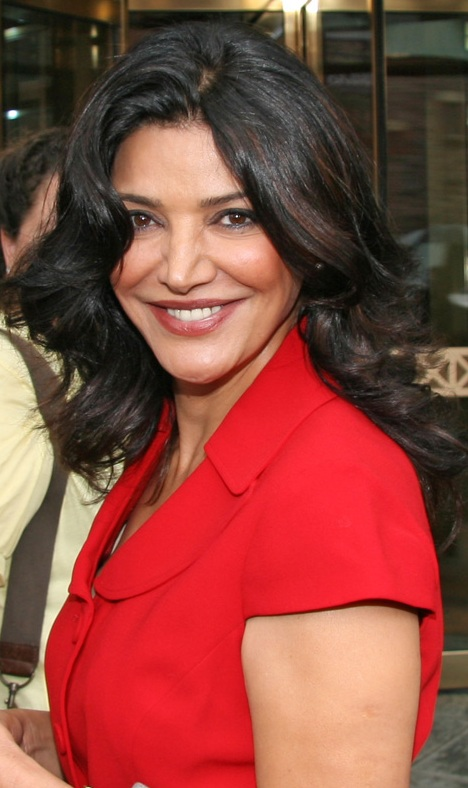
Actress Shohreh Aghdashloo

- Nabil Abou-Harb – filmmaker; writer and director of Arab in America
- Shohreh Aghdashloo – Academy Award-nominated Iranian-born actress
- Moustapha Akkad – film director, producer
- Mahershala Ali – Oscar-winning actor.
- Lewis Arquette – film actor, writer, and producer
- Sayed Badreya – actor, filmmaker
- Giancarlo Esposito – actor
- Jaafar Jackson – actor, singer
- Saïd Taghmaoui – actor
- Faran Tahir – actor

== Modeling ==
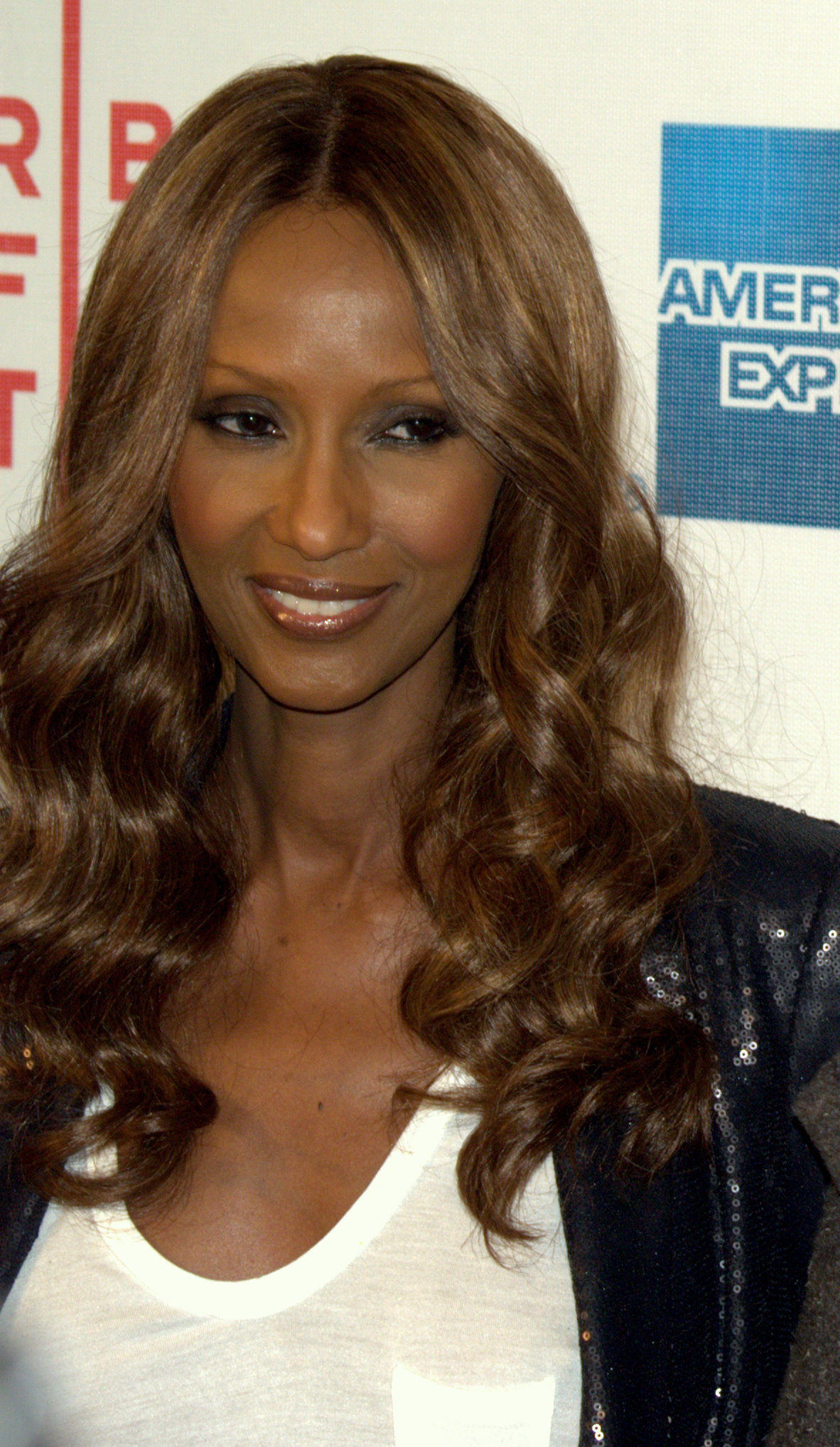
Supermodel Iman

- Halima Aden – Somali-American fashion model
- Iman – supermodel and widow of David Bowie
- Bella Hadid – fashion model and daughter of real-estate developer Mohamed Hadid and former model Yolanda Hadid
- Leana Deeb – Content creator

== Music ==
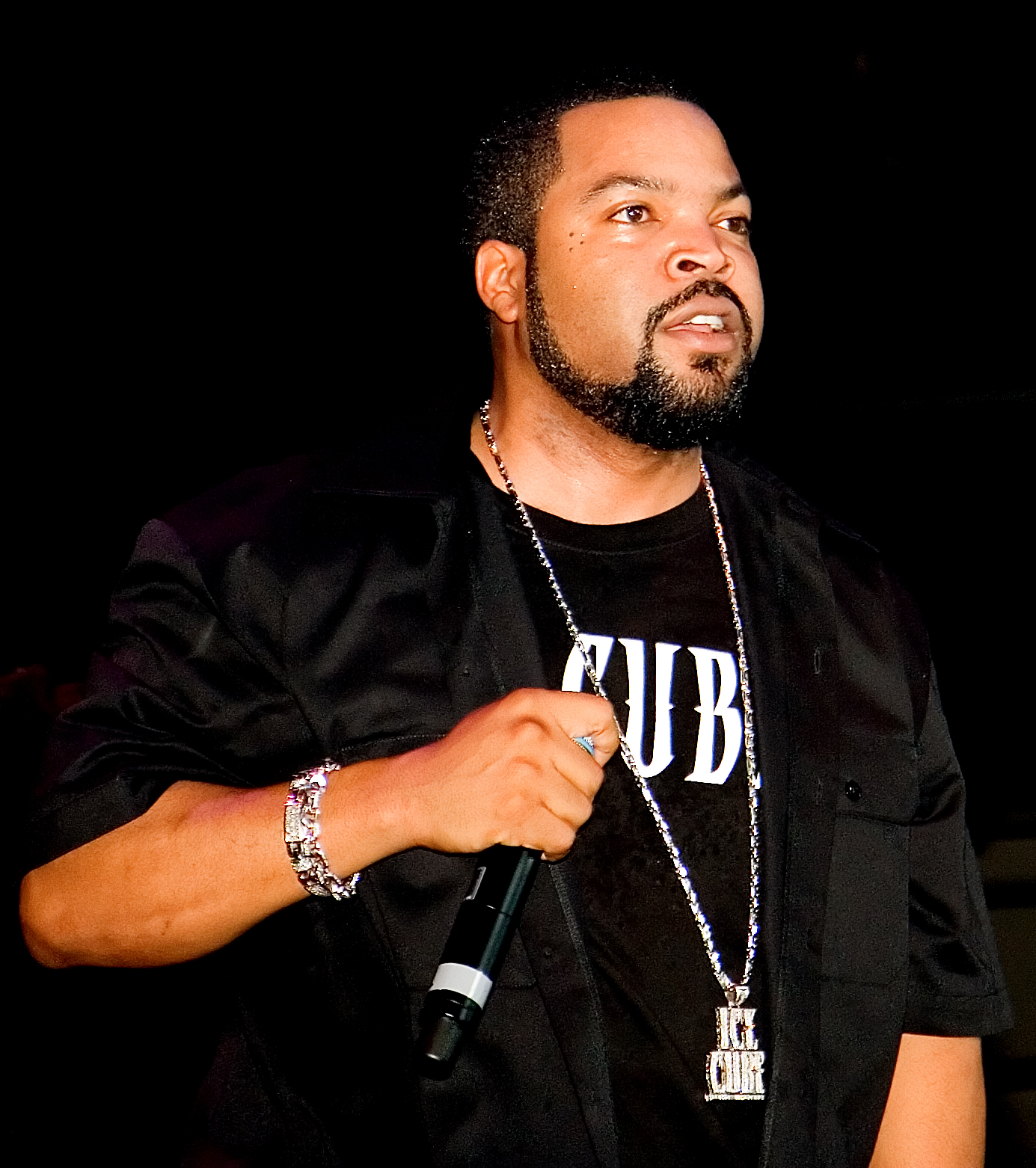
Rapper Ice Cube performing in 2006

- Ahmad Jamal – jazz pianist
- Ahmet Ertegün – Songwriter and founder of Atlantic Records
- Akon – R&B and hip-hop artist
- Ali Shaheed Muhammad – producer, DJ and rapper, formerly of A Tribe Called Quest; Sunni Muslim
- Art Blakey – jazz drummer and bandleader
- Beanie Sigel – rapper
- Brother Ali – rapper; converted to Islam
- Chali 2na – rapper, formerly of the alternative hip-hop group Jurassic 5, and of Ozomatli
- DJ Khaled – rap artist and DJ
- Everlast – rapper from the Irish-American hip-hop group House of Pain; converted to Islam
- Freeway – rapper; Sunni Muslim
- Ghostface Killah – rapper, member of the hip-hip group the Wu-Tang Clan
- Ice Cube – rapper and producer
- Jermaine Jackson – singer, bass guitarist
- Kevin Gates – rapper
- Lupe Fiasco – rapper; Sunni Muslim
- MC Ren – rapper
- Mona Haydar – rapper; Sunni Muslim
- Mos Def – rapper; initially joined the Nation of Islam before converting to Islam
- Napoleon – former member of Tupac Shakur's rap group the Outlawz, now a motivational Muslim speaker
- Native Deen – rap group
- Q-Tip – rapper, formerly of A Tribe Called Quest; Sunni Muslim
- Raekwon – rapper, member of the hip-hip group the Wu-Tang Clan
- Rhymefest – Grammy Award-winning hip-hop artist; co-writer of the single "Jesus Walks"
- Richard Thompson – British folk rock singer, Sufi Muslim since 1974
- Scarface – rapper
- Vinnie Paz – rapper in the hip-hop group Jedi Mind Tricks
- Yusef Lateef – jazz musician and Grammy Award winner

== Religion ==
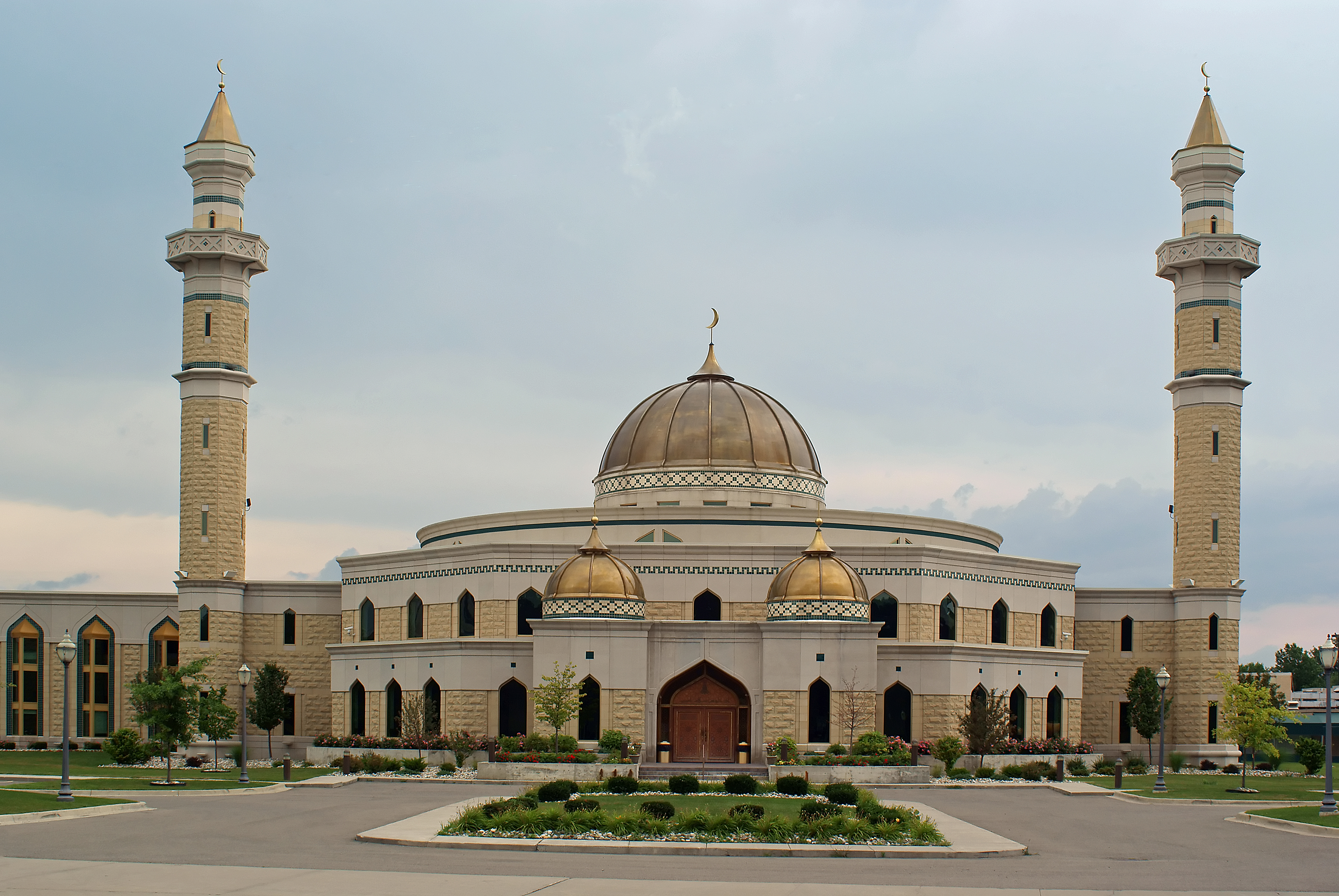
The Islamic Center of America located in Dearborn, Michigan near Detroit is the largest mosque in the United States.

Estimated proportion of Muslim Americans in each U.S. state, the District of Columbia, and Puerto Rico as of the 2020 U.S. Religion Census

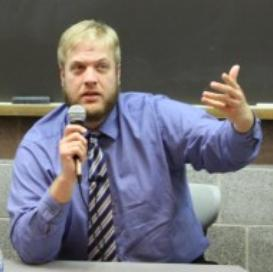
Muslim scholar Suhaib Webb

- Abu Ammar Yasir Qadhi – Muslim Scholar.
- Omar Suleiman – Muslim activist and Imam.
- Dalia Mogahed – Muslim speaker and activist.
- Yasmin Mogahed – Muslim speaker and activist.
- Ismail al-Faruqi – Muslim philosopher and scholar
- Jonathan A C Brown – Muslim lecturer and scholar.
- Amina Wadud – Islamic scholar and activist
- Suhaib Webb – Muslim lecturer and activist; Imam of the Islamic Society of Boston Cultural Center, the largest mosque in the New England area
- Hamza Yusuf – Muslim scholar
- Hassan Hathout – Muslim scholar
- Hassan Al-Qazwini – Muslim scholar
- Hisham Kabbani – Muslim sufi scholar and shaykh
- Yusuf Estes – Muslim preacher
- Souleiman Ghali – Founder of the Islamic Society of San Francisco
- Sherman Jackson – Muslim scholar
- Nouman Ali Khan – Muslim speaker and founder, CEO and lead instructor at Bayyinah, the Institute for Arabic and Qur'anic Studies.
- Sadullah Khan – Muslim scholar
- Ingrid Mattson – Muslim scholar
- Warith Deen Mohammed – former leader of the largest Muslim organization, the American Society of Muslims (son of Nation of Islam leader)
- Daniel Haqiqatjou – Muslim polemicist, debator, and Da'ee
- Louay M. Safi – Muslim scholar
- Zaid Shakir – Muslim scholar
- Siraj Wahhaj – Muslim scholar
- Omar Khalidi – Muslim scholar
- Amir Hussain – Muslim scholar, editor of the Journal of the American Academy of Religion
- Asifa Quraishi – Muslim legal scholar
- Azizah al-Hibri – Muslim legal scholar
- Laleh Bakhtiar – translator of the Quran

== Science ==
- Shereef Elnahal – commissioner, New Jersey Department of Health, transitioning to CEO of University Hospital, Newark in July 2019
- Fazlur Khan – structural engineer (designed the Sears Tower, John Hancock Center)
- Ayub K. Ommaya – neurosurgeon, inventor of the Ommaya reservoir
- Ahmed Zewail – Nobel Prize winner in Chemistry, 1999 for his work on femtochemistry
- Aziz Sancar – Nobel Prize winner in Chemistry, 2015 along with Tomas Lindahl and Paul L. Modrich for their mechanistic studies of DNA repair
- Anousheh Ansari – engineer and first person of Iranian descent in space

== Sports ==
=== Boxing ===
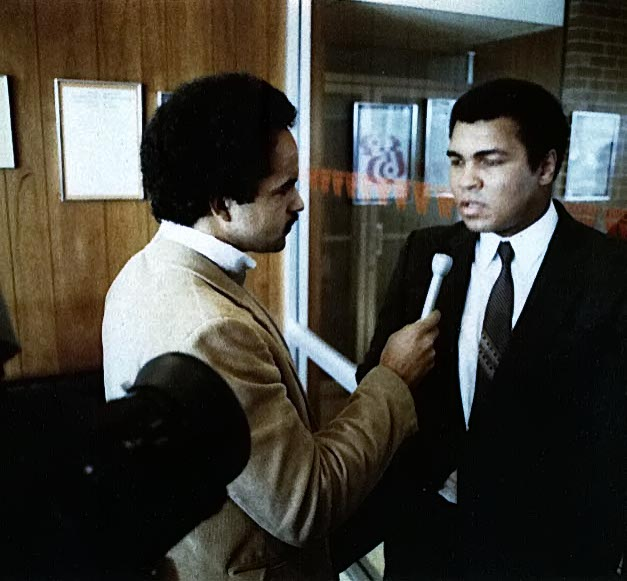
Boxer Muhammad Ali in 1978

- Muhammad Ali – became a member of the Nation of Islam in 1964, converted to Sunni Islam in 1975
- Bernard Hopkins – former Middleweight and Light Heavyweight world champion
- Eddie Mustafa Muhammad – former Light Heavyweight Champion
- Matthew Saad Muhammad – former Light Heavyweight Champion
- Dwight Muhammad Qawi – former Light Heavyweight and Cruiserweight Champion
- Hasim Rahman – former Heavyweight champion
- Mike Tyson – Undisputed Heavyweight Champion in 1987; converted in 1994 (influenced by preacher in prison)
- Gervonta Davis – former Super Featherweight and Light Welterweight champion, Lightweight world champion as of January 2024, converted to Islam in 2023

=== Basketball ===
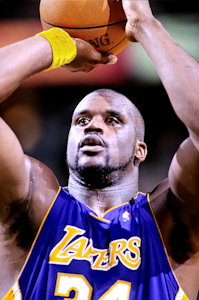
NBA player Shaquille O'Neal

- DeSagana Diop – Senegalese basketball player for the Charlotte Bobcats
- Kareem Abdul-Jabbar – converted to Islam from Catholicism in 1968, initially joining the Nation of Islam before retaking the Shahada and converting to Sunni Islam that very summer
- Enes Kanter – Turkish basketball player for the Portland Trail Blazers
- Mahmoud Abdul-Rauf – former player for Denver Nuggets (converted in 1991, formerly Chris Jackson)
- Shareef Abdur-Rahim – retired player, named NBA All-Star in 2001-02 season
- Hassan Adams – drafted by and played for the New Jersey Nets, later the Cleveland Cavaliers, then KK Vojvodina (in Serbia).
- Larry Johnson – retired player, played for the Charlotte Hornets and New York Knicks
- Nazr Mohammed – player for the Charlotte Bobcats
- Mehmet Okur – Turkish player of the Utah Jazz
- Shaquille O'Neal – former player for the Los Angeles Lakers; rapper and actor
- Hakeem Olajuwon – former player for the Houston Rockets
- Rasheed Wallace – former player for the Detroit Pistons
- Kyrie Irving – player for Brooklyn Nets
- Jaylen Brown – player for Boston Celtics
- Satou Sabally – player for New York Liberty
- Bilqis Abdul-Qaadir – former player for University of Memphis
- Jamad Fiin – former player for Emmanuel College (Massachusetts)
- Shayla Smith – player for Pennsylvania State University
- Taliah Scott – player for Baylor University
- Batouly Camara – former player for University of Connecticut

=== Fencing ===
- Ibtihaj Muhammad – Olympic bronze medalist

=== Mixed martial arts ===
- Muhammed Lawal – former Strikeforce Light Heavyweight World Champion
- Kamaru Usman – current UFC Welterweight Champion

=== NFL ===
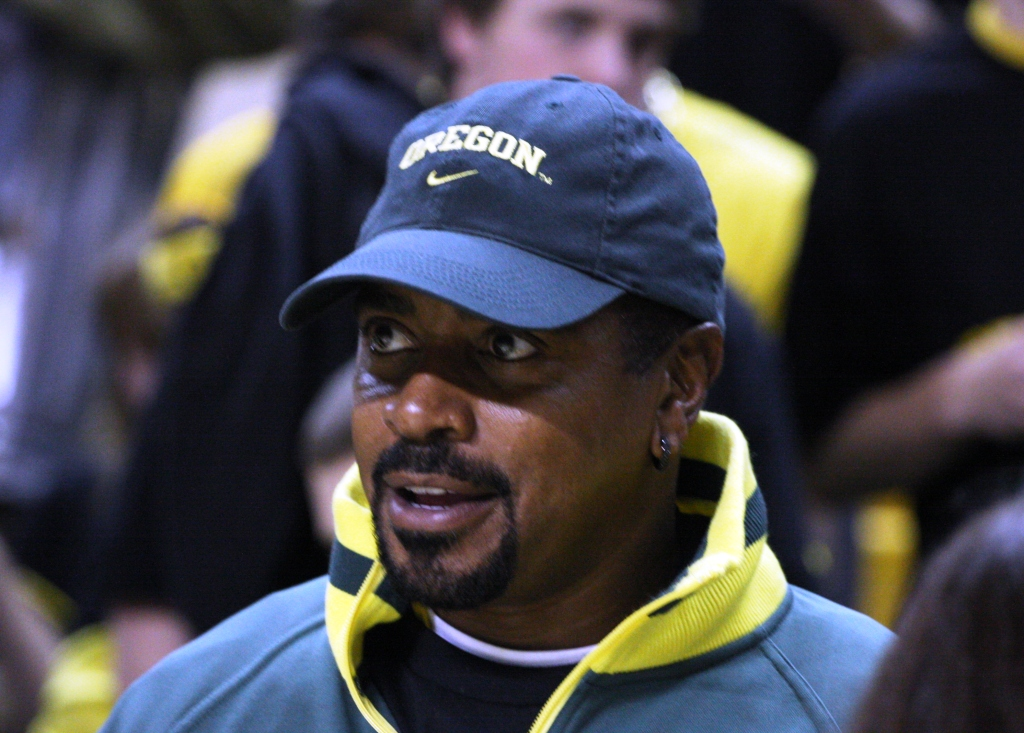
NFL player turned sportscaster Ahmad Rashad

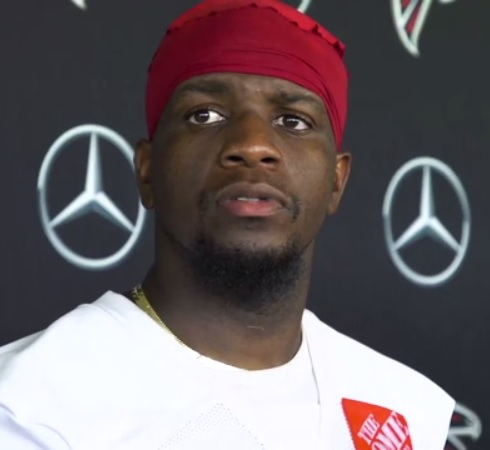
NFL player Mohamed Sanu

- Ameer Abdullah – running back, drafted by the Detroit Lions in 2015, currently with the Minnesota Vikings
- Oday Aboushi – guard, drafted by the New York Jets in 2013, currently with the Detroit Lions.
- Dominique Easley – linebacker, drafted by the New England Patriots in 2014, currently a free agent.
- Mohamed Sanu – wide receiver, drafted by the Cincinnati Bengals in 2012, currently with the San Francisco 49ers
- Muhammad Wilkerson – defensive end, drafted by the New York Jets in 2011, currently a free agent.
- Hamza Abdullah – former safety for the Cleveland Browns
- Husain Abdullah – former safety for the Minnesota Vikings
- Az-Zahir Hakim – former wide receiver for the St. Louis Rams
- Ryan Harris – former offensive tackle for the Pittsburgh Steelers.
- Abdul Hodge – former linebacker for the Carolina Panthers
- Josh Palmer – Wide receiver for the Los Angeles Chargers
- Ahmad Rashad – former wide receiver for Minnesota Vikings, award-winning sportscaster (converted in 1972)
- Ephraim Salaam – former offensive tackle for the Detroit Lions
- Robert Saleh – Defensive coordinator for the San Francisco 49ers former Head Coach for the New York Jets.
- Malik Mustapha – player for the San Francisco 49ers
- Azeez Al-Shaair – player for the Houston Texans
- Abdul Carter – player for the New York Giants
- Mansoor Delane – player for the Kansas City Chiefs
- Jeremiah Owusu-Koramoah – player for the Cleveland Browns
- Malik Muhammad – player for the Chicago Bears

=== Soccer ===
- Yunus Musah – USMNT player

=== Track and field ===
- Khalid Khannouchi – marathon runner
- Dalilah Muhammad – Olympic gold and silver medalist
- Yasmine Mansi – former runner for University of Michigan

=== Wrestling ===
- Adeel Alam – Pakistani American, wrestler in WWE
- Khosrow Vaziri – Retired Iranian American wrestler, former WWE Champion

== Television ==
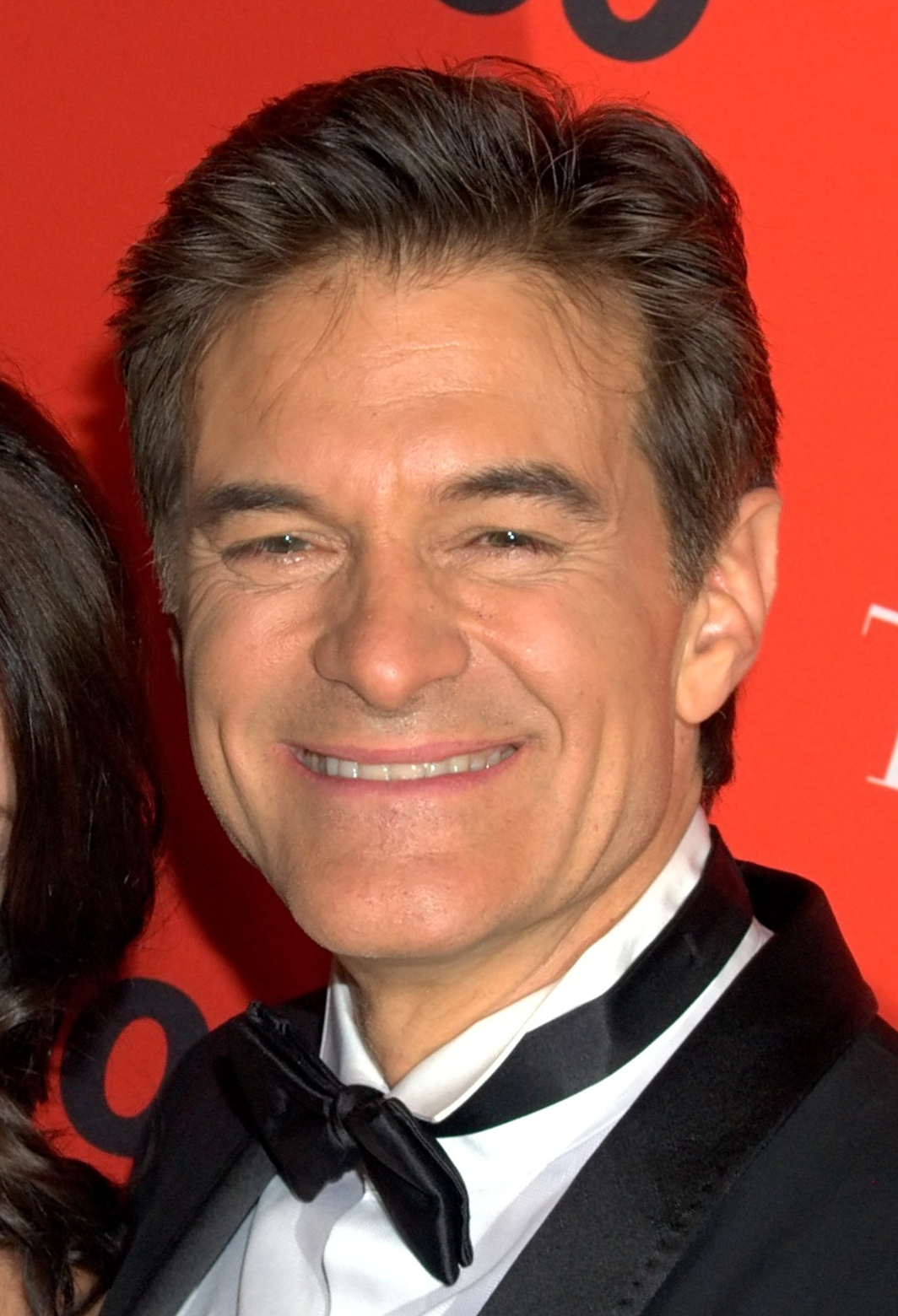
Mehmet Oz at the 2010 Time 100 Gala

- Mara Brock Akil – screenwriter, producer
- Usman Ally – actor
- Ahmed Shihab-Eldin – reporter for national news channels
- Zehra Fazal – actress and comedienne
- Rizwan Manji – actor
- Ayman Mohyeldin – reporter for national news channels
- Isaiah Mustafa – actor
- Mehmet Oz – medical doctor, talk show host
- Kamran Pasha – screenwriter, producer
- Tahera Rahman – Newscaster for WHBF-TV and KLJB. Widely covered by the media for being the first American hijabi Muslim newscaster.
- Iqbal Theba – actor
- Ali Velshi – Reporter and anchor for national U.S. news channels, from Canada
- Ramy Youssef – Actor and comedian

== Writing ==
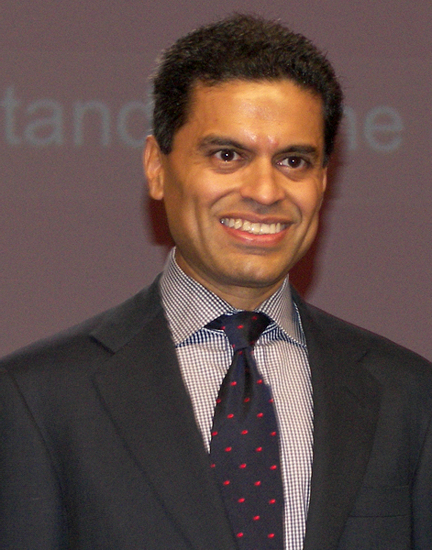
Fareed Zakaria, head of Newsweek International

- Wael Abdelgawad – author
- Saladin Ahmed – author
- Reza Aslan – author, religious scholar
- Mona Eltahawy – columnist
- Yahiya Emerick – author
- Hafsah Faizal – Author of youth literature, of Sri Lankan and Arab descent.
- Khaled Hosseini – Novelist, physician
- Suad Abdul Khabeer – author
- Laila Lalami – author and essayist
- Melody Moezzi – author and activist
- Ayman Mohyeldin – Al-Jazeera English journalist
- Etaf Rum – Novelist
- Lulu Schwartz – journalist
- Ambreen Tariq – American author, activist and founder of @BrownPeopleCamping
- G. Willow Wilson – comics writer and author
- Michael Wolfe – journalist
- Fareed Zakaria – author, commentator, and host of CNN's Fareed Zakaria GPS

== See also ==
- Glossary of Islamic terms in Arabic
- List of converts to Islam
- List of Islamic and Muslim related topics
- Lists of Muslims
- Lists of people by belief
- Taqwacore
