= Mogahed =

Mogahed is a surname. Notable people with the surname include:

- Dalia Mogahed, American researcher and consultant
- Yasmin Mogahed, American educator and motivational speaker
