= Tahera =

There are multiple meanings for Tahera:

- Tahera is an alternate transliteration for Táhirih, poet
- Tahera (mining company), operates a diamond mine in Nunavut
- Tahera Rahman, a newscaster
