= Waset =

Waset or WASET may refer to:

- Waset, ancient Egyptian name of Thebes, Egypt
- World Academy of Science, Engineering and Technology (WASET), a predatory publisher
- Waset or Wosret, an Egyptian goddess

== See also ==
- Wasat (disambiguation)
