= Wasat =

Wasat (Arabic: وسط 'center' or 'middle ground'), or Al wasat, may refer to:

== Arts, entertainment and media ==
- "Wasat", a song by Com Truise from the 2014 EP Wave 1
- Al-Wasat (Bahraini newspaper)
- Alwasat (Kuwaiti newspaper)

== Politics ==
- Al-Wasat Party, a moderate Islamist political party in Egypt
- Islamic Centre Party (Hizb al-Wasat al-Islami), a political party in Jordan

== Other uses ==
- Delta Geminorum, a triple star system formally named Wasat
- Moderation in Islam, or wasat
  - Moderate Muslim

== See also ==
- Wasatism, an approach towards Islamic law
- Islamic neo-traditionalism, also known as Wasatism
