= George Bethune English =

American adventurer and diplomat

George Bethune English (March 7, 1787 – September 20, 1828) was an American adventurer, diplomat, soldier, and convert to Islam.

The oldest of four children, English was born in Cambridge, Massachusetts, where he was baptized at Trinity Church on April 1, 1787. His father was Thomas English (1759–1839), a prominent merchant, agent and shipbuilder in Boston, and his mother was Penelope Bethune (1763–1819), daughter of George Bethune (1720–1785) and his wife Mary Faneuil (1732–1797), niece of Peter Faneuil.

He later attended Harvard College, where his dissertation won a Bowdoin Prize. While initially studying law, he received a Masters in Theology in 1811. Like many Protestant divinity students of the time he studied the Pentateuch; unlike the others he also studied the Quran. During these studies, English became disillusioned and encountered doubts about Christian theology; He found Jewish anti-Christian manuscripts at Harvard Library and studied them, and then took them to Rabbi Gershom Seixas in New York in order to discuss the points at issue. He went on to publish his misgivings in a book entitled The Grounds of Christianity Examined, which earned him excommunication from the Churches of Christ in 1814, and many negative responses. English addressed some of the criticisms and controversies caused by his first book in a second tract, "A Letter to the Reverend Mr. Cary," as well as in published responses to Unitarian leader William Ellery Channing's Two Sermons on Infidelity. Another rejoinder to his first book from former Harvard colleague, Edward Everett, entitled A Defence of Christianity Against the Works of George B. English would be replied to a decade later, after English's return from Egypt; it was titled Five Smooth Stones out of the Brook.

George English subsequently went "out west" (then Ohio and Indiana Territory) where he briefly edited a frontier newspaper, and settled as a member of the puritanical Harmonie Sect. During this time he may have learned the Cherokee language.

English was among the Marine Officers nominated by President James Madison on February 27, 1815; he was commissioned a second lieutenant on March 1, 1815, in the United States Marine Corps and assigned to Marine Corps headquarters, as the War of 1812 ended. He then sailed to the Mediterranean, and was among the first citizens of the United States known to have visited Egypt. Shortly after arriving in Egypt he resigned his commission, converted to Islam and joined Muhammad Ali Pasha as the Topgi Bashi (chief of artillery) in an expedition up the Nile River against Sennar 1820, winning distinction as an officer of artillery. Some historians have noted that "there is a high probability that he became a secret agent" and that his service in Egypt was a part of that intelligence service. He published his Narrative of the Expedition to Dongola and Sennaar (London 1822) regarding his exploits.

After his work for Muhammad Ali Pasha, English worked in the Diplomatic Corps of the United States in the Levant, where he worked to secure a trade agreement between the United States and the Ottoman Empire, which had trade valued at nearly $800,000 in 1822. In 1827, he returned to the United States and died in Washington the next year.

There is no record of him marrying or having children.

== See also ==
- List of American Muslims

== Notes ==
- Disputing Christianity, by Richard H. Popkin, with Jeremy D. Popkin; Prometheus books ISBN 1-59102-384-X
- Americans in Egypt, 1770–1915, by Cassandra Vivian, 2012, ISBN 9780786463046
- The Déjà Vu of American secret diplomacy, by Edward F. Sayle, International Journal of Intelligence and CounterIntelligence, Volume 2, Issue 3, 1988
- The historical underpinnings of the U.S. intelligence community, by Edward F. Sayle, International Journal of Intelligence and CounterIntelligence, Volume 1, Issue 1, 1986
- Islam and ‘Scientific Religion’ in the United States before 1935, by Patrick D. Bowen, Islam and Christian–Muslim Relations, Volume 22, Issue 3, 2011
