= Yasir Qadhi =

American Islamic scholar and preacher (born 1975)

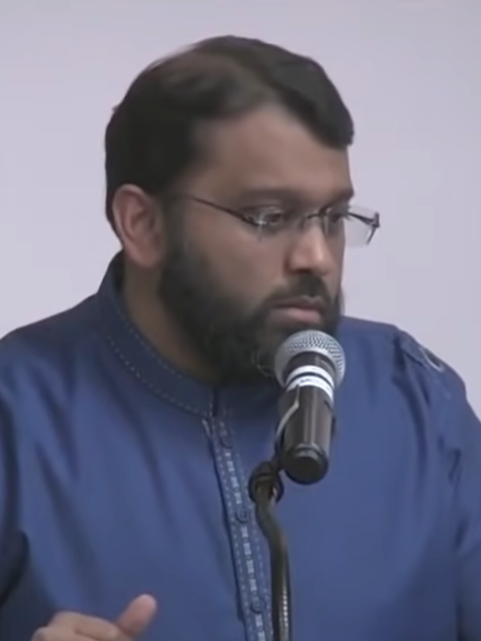
- Qadhi in 2018

Personal life
- Born: January 30, 1975 (age 51) Houston, Texas, USA
- Education: Yale University (MPhil, PhD); Islamic University of Madinah (BA, MA); University of Houston (BSc)
- Website: yasirqadhi.com

Religious life
- Religion: Islam
- Denomination: Sunni
- Creed: Athari
- Movement: Wasatism

Muslim leader
- Influenced by: Ibn Taymiyyah; Ibn Qayyim al-Jawziyyah; Al-Shawkani; Rashid Rida; Hassan al-Banna; Ibn al-Uthaymeen; Yusuf al-Qaradawi; Ali al-Tamimi; Abd Al-Aziz Al-Fawzan; Salman al-Ouda; Hatim al-Awni; Zakir Naik

YouTube information
- Channel: Yasir Qadhi
- Years active: 2012–present
- Genre: Islamic
- Subscribers: 764 thousand
- Views: 140.4 million
- Last updated: November 5th, 2026

Yasir Qadhi (Urdu: یاسر قاضی; born January 30, 1975), formerly known by his Arabic kunya Abu Ammaar Yasir Qadhi (أبو عمار ياسر قاضي), is an American Muslim scholar and theologian. He is dean of The Islamic Seminary of America and resident scholar of the East Plano Islamic Center in Plano, Texas. He was formerly the dean of AlMaghrib Institute and taught in the religious studies department at Rhodes College. He currently serves as chairman of the Fiqh Council of North America.

Born in Texas to Pakistani parents, Qadhi grew up in Jeddah, Saudi Arabia. He studied chemical engineering at the University of Houston, before studying Hadith and Islamic theology at the Islamic University of Madinah in Saudi Arabia. He earned his PhD from Yale University where his dissertation focused on the writings of Ibn Taymiyyah. Qadhi has written books and lectured widely on Islam and contemporary Muslim issues, and is considered one of the most influential Muslim scholars in the United States. He has also consistently been listed in the annual listicle The 500 Most Influential Muslims.

Qadhi was previously affiliated with Salafism, but has since left it. He now identifies himself as a Wasatist and has been described as such.

== Early life and education ==
Qadhi was born in Houston, Texas to Pakistani parents. His father, Mazhar Kazi (1936 - November 23, 2025), a doctor and da'i, helped found the first mosque in the area and published books and pamphlets on Islam, while his mother is a microbiologist, both from Karachi in Pakistan. His father migrated from Jabalpur, present-day India to Pakistan. His family originated from present-day Uttar Pradesh. When he was five, after his father became assistant dean of a medical college, the family moved to Jeddah, Saudi Arabia, where he attended a British school. At home, his family would do halaqas of the Qur’an and he had a private hafiz teach him. By 15 he had memorized the Qur'an and graduated from high school two years early as class valedictorian. He also helped his father with an Islamic publication. He returned to the United States, where he earned a B.Sc in Chemical Engineering at the University of Houston. He has an elder brother named Ustadh Obaid Kazi.

== Professional career ==
After a short stint working in engineering at Dow Chemical, in 1996 Qadhi enrolled at the Islamic University of Medinah in Medina, Saudi Arabia. There, he earned a bachelor's degree in Arabic from the university's College of Hadith and Islamic Sciences and a master's degree in Islamic Theology from its College of Dawah. Qadhi returned to the United States after working and studying for nine years in Saudi Arabia. He completed a doctorate in theology at Yale University in New Haven, Connecticut.

Qadhi taught in the Religious Studies Department of Rhodes College, in Memphis, Tennessee. He previously was the Dean of Academic Affairs and an instructor for the AlMaghrib Institute, a seminar-based Islamic education institution founded in 2001. The instructors travel to teach Islamic studies in English. He moved to the Dallas metropolitan area in early 2019, becoming the resident scholar of the East Plano Islamic Center. He is the Dean of Academic Affairs at The Islamic Seminary of America.

Qadhi was a guest on an episode of Harvard professor Henry Louis Gates's television genealogy series Finding Your Roots on PBS.

== Views ==
=== Salafi movement ===
Yasir Qadhi’s formative scholarship and early career were firmly rooted in the Salafi tradition: after earning a B.Sc. in Chemical Engineering at the University of Houston, he studied Hadith and Islamic theology at the Islamic University of Madinah, and later served for fifteen years as Dean of Academic Affairs at the Salafi-oriented AlMaghrib Institute in Houston, Texas. In the aftermath of the September 11 attacks and throughout his doctoral studies in Islamic theology at Yale University (2005–2013), Qadhi began to question what he saw as Salafism’s methodological rigidity and exclusivist frameworks. By the mid-2010s, he had formally distanced himself from the movement and adopted a wasaṭī (middle-way) approach within Sunni Islam, seeking to balance textual fidelity to the Qur’an and Sunnah with thoughtful engagement in contemporary social and intellectual contexts.

=== Jihad ===
Qadhi has presented papers on jihad movements. In 2006, at a conference at Harvard Law School, Qadhi presented a 15-minute analysis of the theological underpinnings of an early militant movement in modern Saudi Arabia headed by Juhayman al-Otaibi. The movement had gained international attention when it held the Grand Mosque of Mecca hostage in 1979.

In September 2009, he presented a paper at an international conference at the University of Edinburgh on understanding jihad in the modern world. He said the specific legal ruling (fatwa) of the 13–14th century theologian Ibn Taymiyya on the Mongol Empire has been wrongfully used in the 20th and 21st centuries by both jihadist and pacifist groups to justify their positions. The paper has been critiqued by some Salafi commentators, who say that they in fact did not revise the definition of Jihad.

=== Sufism and veneration of the saints ===
Qadhi believes that the practice of some Sufi Muslims visiting the graves of Sufi saints and calling upon Muhammad and calling upon them for help or guidance is not shirk (polytheism) but said it is haram, sinful, an evil innovation, and called it a stepping stone and gateway to shirk but not shirk in and of itself. Qadhi has also stated that these Muslims should still be regarded as Muslims, though misguided. He believes that questioning whether veneration of Sufi saints at gravesites can be called shirk is highly problematic because that would mean accusing many Muslim scholars who hold affirmative views towards it of committing shirk and being out of the fold of Islam. He has said it is not shirk in and of itself unless they believe they are calling out to a god, intend to worship or believe in the saints to have independent powers in and of themselves. He has also stated that Sufi Muslims that participate in the practice do not believe in the saints to be gods and don't intend it to be worship when calling upon them, nor do they believe that the saints are giving assistance to them completely independently from God.

=== Ahruf and Qira'at ===
On June 8, 2020, Qadhi had posited that the "standard narrative" in light of different Qira'at and Ahruf "has holes in it. That's what I'm gonna say. The standard narrative does not answer some very pressing questions." In 2024, he had published his views in the eighth chapter of Redhwan Karim's History of the Quran, referring to the "Standard Narrative" as the dictation model, the description of which was followed by contentions referring to Hadiths that Qadhi found incompatible with the model, with Qadhi then going on to posit an alternative model he referred to as the "Divine Permission Model" which he claimed to deal with these "holes" much better. He wrote that this alternative model was posited by At-Tahawi and Al-Shafi'i.

=== Views on social issues ===
Yasir Qadhi has criticized progressive Muslims who interpret Islamic law as supporting homosexual relations, saying these teachings contain "very little Islam".

In regards to religious liberties, Qadhi believes that Islamic teachings do not support or require that Muslim business owners discriminate or refuse service to LGBTQ individuals. Nonetheless, Qadhi expresses concern that Islamic institutions may face issues if they speak in a vulgar manner and employ or fire employees that do not conform to conservative beliefs regarding sexual behaviors.

== Death threat by Islamic State of Iraq and the Syria ==
In the April 2016 issue of Dabiq Magazine, the Islamic State of Iraq and the Levant declared Qadhi, along with Hamza Yusuf, Bilal Philips, Suhaib Webb and numerous other Western Islamic speakers, as murtads, that is, apostates or blasphemers. He was threatened with death over his denunciation of ISIS.

== Controversies ==
Some of his statements have been controversial, including comments in a speech in 2001 questioning Hitler's motives in the Holocaust. He later stated that he regretted those comments and visited the Auschwitz concentration camp with a delegation of Muslim leaders.

In January 2010, the British The Daily Telegraph reported that in 2001 Qadhi had described the Holocaust as a hoax and false propaganda, and had said that "Hitler never intended to mass-destroy the Jews." The following year The New York Times reported he said that most Islamic studies professors in the United States are Jews who "want to destroy us."

Qadhi denied stating that the Holocaust was a hoax or that it was false propaganda, but in 2008 admitted that he had briefly held mistaken beliefs about the Holocaust, and had said "that Hitler never actually intended to massacre the Jews, he actually wanted to expel them to neighboring lands." Qadhi said that his views were wrong and said "I admit it was an error". Qadhi added that he firmly believes "that the Holocaust was one of the worst crimes against humanity that the 20th century has witnessed" and that "the systematic dehumanization of the Jews in the public eye of the Germans was a necessary precursor" for that tragedy. More generally, he said that he "fell down a slippery slope", expressing anger at actions of the Israeli government in the form of anti-Semitic remarks he later recognized as wrong.

In July 2010, Qadhi was selected to participate in an official delegation of eight U.S. imams and Jewish religious leaders to visit the concentration camps at Auschwitz and Dachau. The imams subsequently released a joint statement condemning anti-Semitism and labeling Holocaust denial as against the ethics of Islam.

The Times newspaper reported that British Charity Commission regulators contacted three Islamic charities about Qadhi's 2015 tour, where he allegedly made controversial comments and told students that "killing homosexuals and stoning adulterers was part of their religion." He also clarified to them that these punishments were only applicable in an Islamic society and were not to be applied in the West.

On June 8, 2020, Qadhi was interviewed by Muslim theologian Mohammed Hijab, where he was asked about the perfect preservation of the Qur'an, in light of different Qira'at and Ahruf. During the interview, Qadhi said, "The standard narrative has holes in it. That's what I'm gonna say. The standard narrative does not answer some very pressing questions." Qadhi later insisted that he was only referring to the preservation of the Qira'at and Ahruf themselves rather than to the preservation of the Qur'an. In 2024, he had published his views in the eighth chapter of Redhwan Karim's History of the Quran, referring to the "Standard Narrative" as the dictation model, the description of which was followed by contentions referring to Hadiths that Qadhi found incompatible with the model, with Qadhi then going on to posit an alternative model he referred to as the "Divine Permission Model" which he claimed to deal with these "holes" much better. He wrote that this alternative model was posited by At-Tahawi and Al-Shafi'i.

On July 9, 2025, an interview on the Real Talk Podcast was published, where Qadhi stated that Western academia did not consider the traditional Islamic methodology of verifying the historical reliability of hadith using isnad to be credible or compatible with the historical-critical method. Qadhi said, "Nobody in the academy affirms the Muslim Sunni science of hadith. Nobody. It is considered to be completely discredited. I'm just being factual."

== Works ==
Books authored or co-authored
Title	Description
Riyaa: Hidden Shirk	Dar-al-Fatah, 1996
An Introduction to the Sciences of the Qura̓an	Al-Hidaayah Pub., 1999, ISBN 1-898649-32-4
An Explanation of the Four Principles of Shirk	Muḥammad ibn ʻAbd al-Wahhāb, Al-Hidaayah, 2000, ISBN 1-898649-52-9
Du'a : The Weapon of the Believer	Al Hidaayah Publishing & Distribution, 2001, ISBN 1-898649-51-0
15 Ways to Increase Your Earnings from the Quran and Sunnah	Al Hidaayah Publishing & Distribution, 2002, ISBN 1-898649-56-1
An explanation of Muhammad ibn Abd al-Wahhab's Kashf al-Shubuhat	A critical analysis of shirk, with Muḥammad ibn ʻAbd al-Wahhāb, Al-Hidaayah, 2003, ISBN 1-898649-62-6
Maqalat al-Jahm b. Safwan wa-atharuha fıl-firaq al-Islamiyya	The Doctrines of Jahm b. Safwan and Its Effects on Islamic Sects, 2 vols. Riyad: Adwa al-salaf, 2005.
Like a Garment: Intimacy in Islam	Independently published (March 4, 2019), ISBN 978-1798705247
Seerah of Prophet Muhammad (SAW)	Independently published (May 7, 2019), (length: 776 pages) ISBN 978-1099278389
Lessons from Surah al-Kahf (Pearls from the Qur'an)	Kube Publishing Ltd. (March 10, 2020), ISBN 978-1847741318
Lessons from Surah Yusuf (Pearls from the Qur'an)	Kube Publishing Ltd. (November 3, 2020), ISBN 978-1847741370
Reflections: Personal Insights From Shaykh Dr. Yasir Qadhi	Al-Buruj Press (February 17, 2021), ISBN 978-9672420651
The Miracle of the Qur'an	Tertib Publishing (March 1, 2021)
The Power of Repentance	Tertib Publishing (March 9, 2021)
The Parables of the Qur'an	Kube Publishing Ltd. (March 12, 2022), ISBN 978-1847741790
The Sīrah of the Prophet: A Contemporary and Original Analysis	Kube Publishing Ltd. (June 15, 2023), ISBN 978-0860378785
Understanding Salafism: Seeking the Path of the Pious Predecessors	Oneworld Publishing (July 15, 2025), ISBN 978-1786078483

=== Research papers ===
- Reconciling Reason and Revelation in the Writings of Ibn Taymiyyah (d. 728/1328): An Analytical Study of Ibn Taymiyyah’s Dar' at-ta’aarod, PhD Dissertation, 2013, Yale University.
- "The Unleashed Thunderbolts' Of Ibn Qayyim Al-Ǧawziyyah: An Introductory Essay", Oriente Moderno vol. 90, no. 1, 2010, pp. 135–149.
- "A Christian Islamist?", Political Theology, vol. 14, issue 6, 2013, pp. 803–812.
- "Salafı-Ash'arı Polemics of the 3rd & 4th Islamic Centuries," The Muslim World, 2016.

=== Translations ===
- Sunan Abu Dawud - first 2 volumes

== See also ==
- AlMaghrib Institute
- Wasatism
- Salafism
- Islam in the United States
- Islam in Dallas
- Omar Suleiman
- Ibn Taymiyya
