= Yasmin Mogahed =

American Muslim Speaker

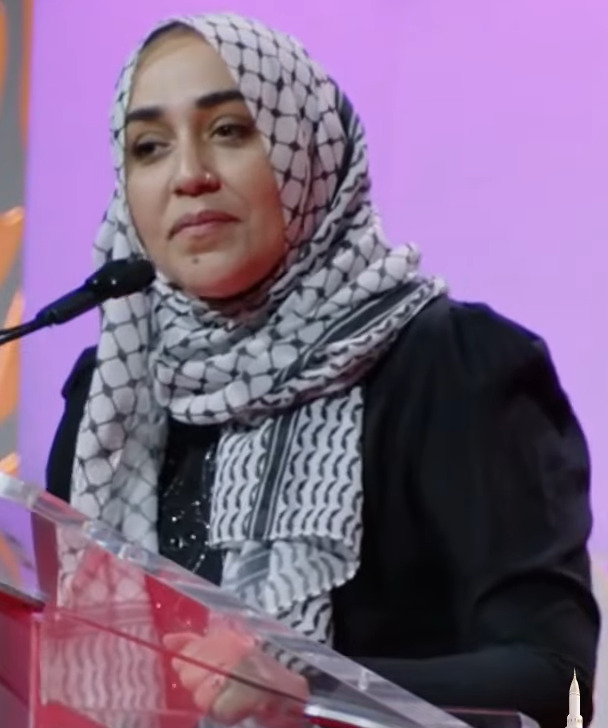
- Born: 11 March 1980 (age 46); Egypt
- Occupations: Educator; author; motivational speaker
- Family: Dalia Mogahed (sister)
- Title: Ustadha

Personal life
- Education: University of Wisconsin–Madison
- Known for: Muslim spirituality

Religious life
- Religion: Islam
- Denomination: Sunni

YouTube information
- Channel: Yasmin Mogahed
- Years active: 2011–present
- Subscribers: 464,000
- Views: 19.1 million
- Last updated: 4 August 2026
- Website: almaghrib.org

Yasmin Mogahed (born March 11, 1980) is an American educator and motivational speaker. She is a specialist in spirituality, psychology, and personal development. Mogahed is the first female instructor at the AlMaghrib Institute.

== Education and career ==
Mogahed completed a BSc degree in psychology at the University of Wisconsin–Madison, where she also earned an MS degree in journalism and mass communications.

She is the first Muslim woman to become an instructor at AlMaghrib Institute. Previously, she had been a writing instructor at Cardinal Stritch University. She is internationally known for her motivational lectures.

== Works ==
Mogahed has written columns for the Huffington Post, and was an Islam section staff columnist for InFocus News.

=== Books ===
- Reclaim Your Heart Yasmin Mogahed, LLC ISBN 978-0-9985373-3-7
- Love & Happiness: A collection of personal reflections and quotes Yasmin Mogahed, LLC ISBN 979-8-9852918-0-3
- Healing the Emptiness: A Guide to emotional and spiritual well-being Yasmin Mogahed ISBN 979-8-9852918-1-0
