= Ommaya reservoir =

Intraventricular catheter system

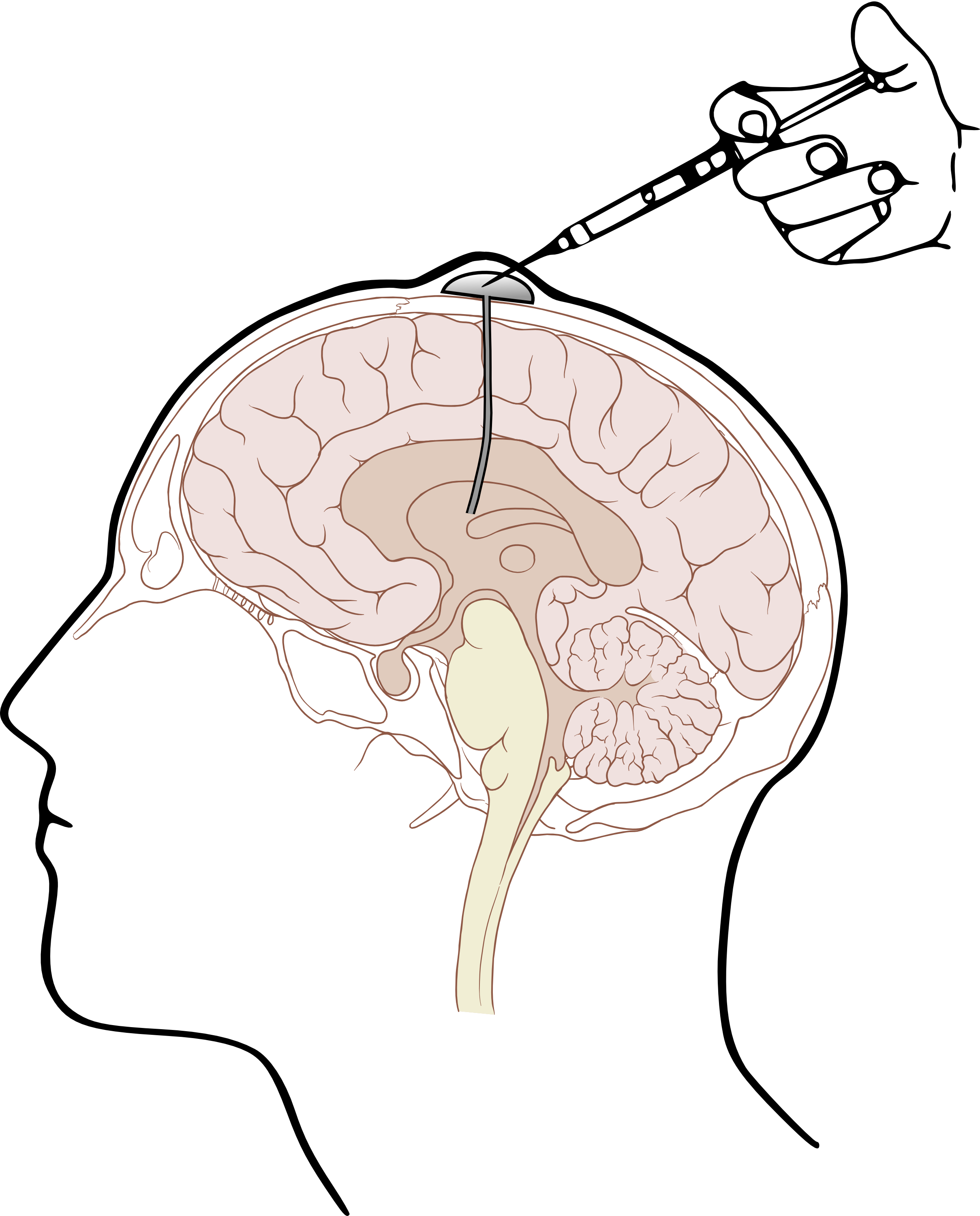
- Schematic of an already-implanted Ommaya reservoir.
- Specialty: Neurology

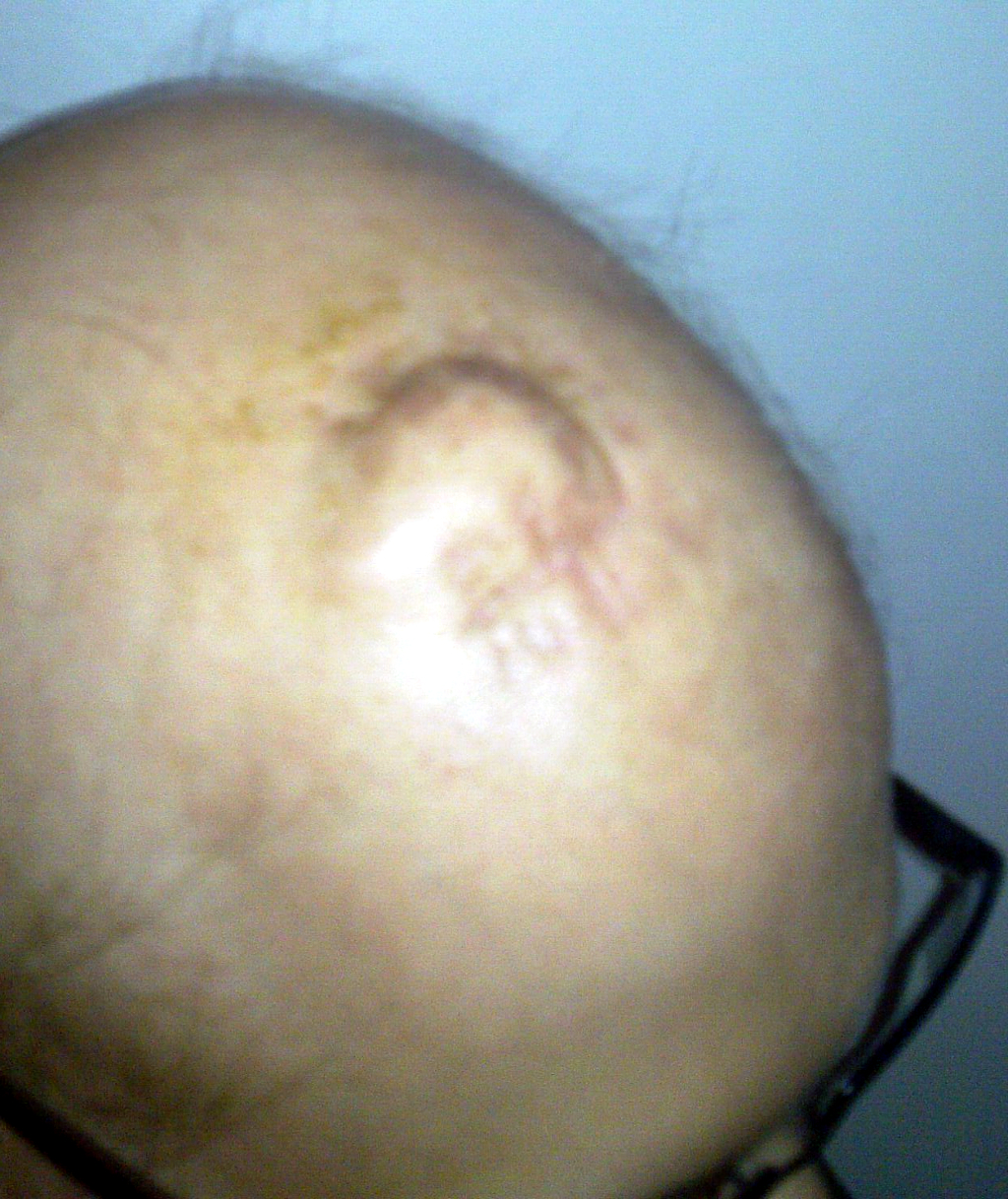
Scalp of a patient with an Ommaya reservoir.

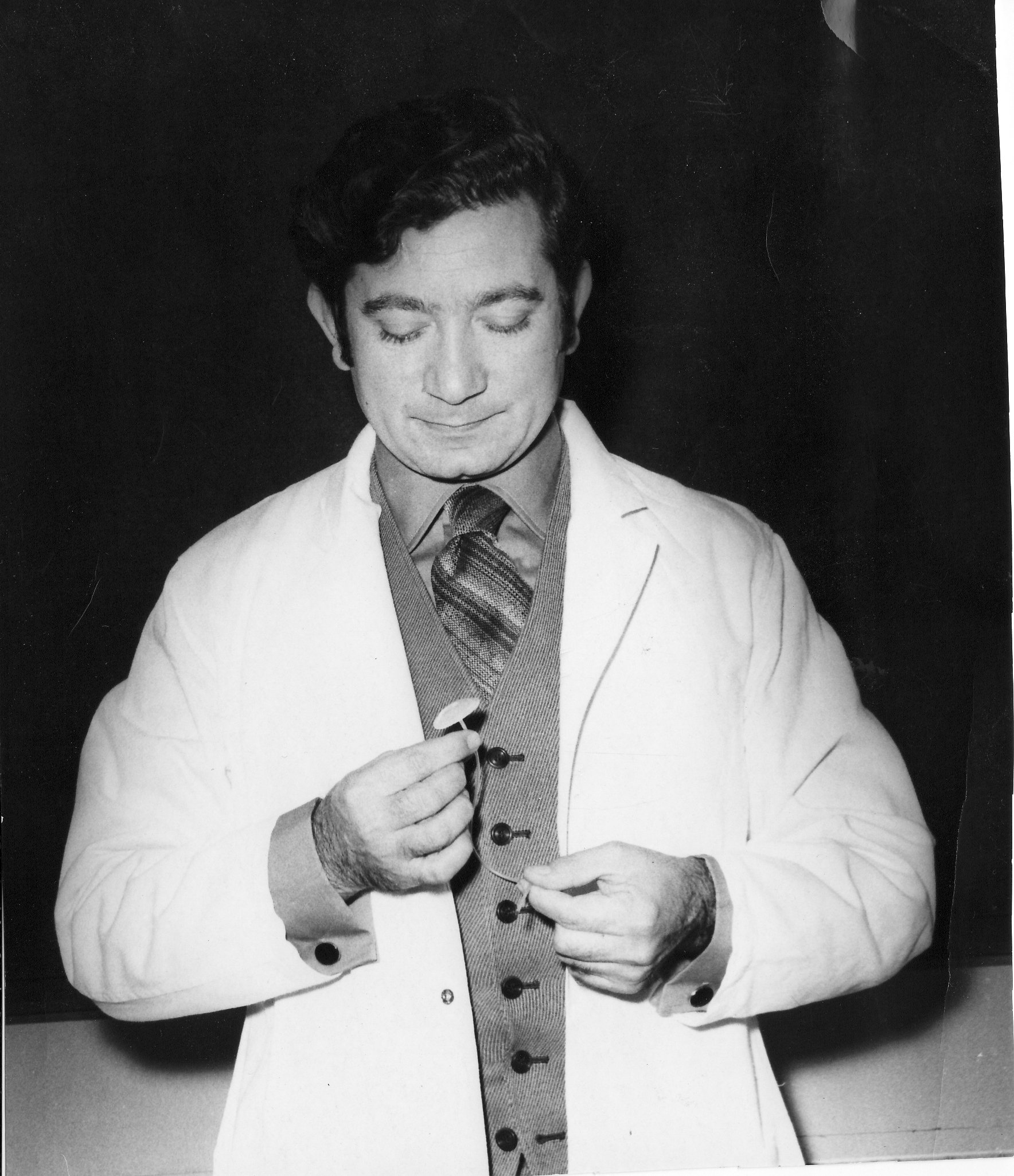
Dr. Ommaya handling his reservoir.

An Ommaya reservoir is an intraventricular catheter system that can be used for the aspiration of cerebrospinal fluid or for the delivery of drugs (e.g. chemotherapy) into the cerebrospinal fluid. It consists of a catheter in one lateral ventricle attached to a reservoir implanted under the scalp. It is used to treat brain tumors, leukemia/lymphoma or leptomeningeal disease by intrathecal drug administration. In the palliative care of terminal cancer, an Ommaya reservoir can be inserted for intracerebroventricular injection (ICV) of morphine.

It was originally invented in 1963 by Ayub K. Ommaya, a Pakistani-American neurosurgeon.

In January 2017, researchers at University of Texas Southwestern Medical Centre used an Ommaya reservoir to measure the intracranial pressure that is regularly observed in astronauts in zero-gravity conditions.

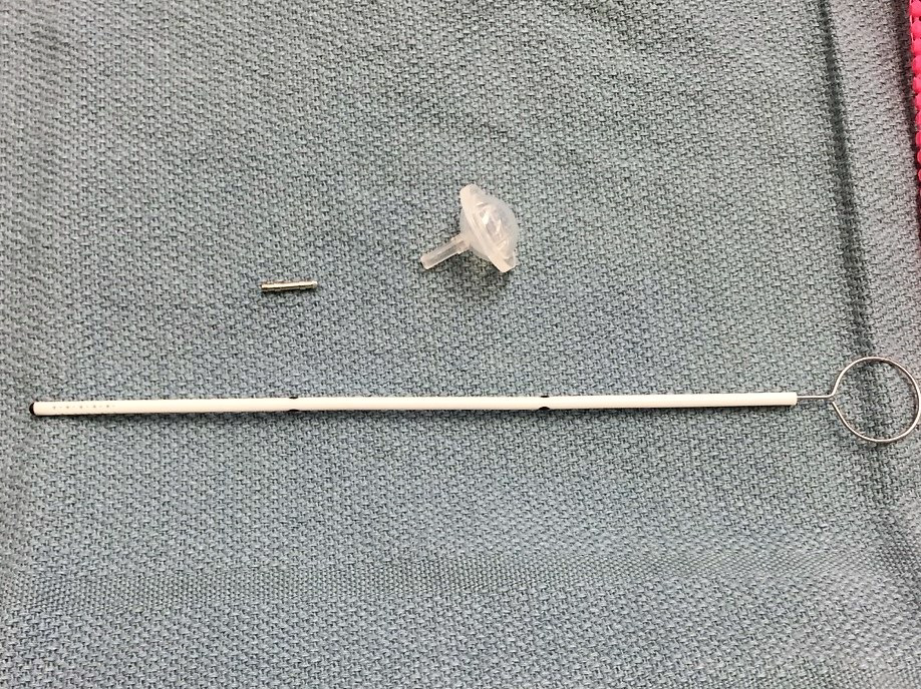
Ommaya reservoir, metal connector pin, and untrimmed peel-away sheath

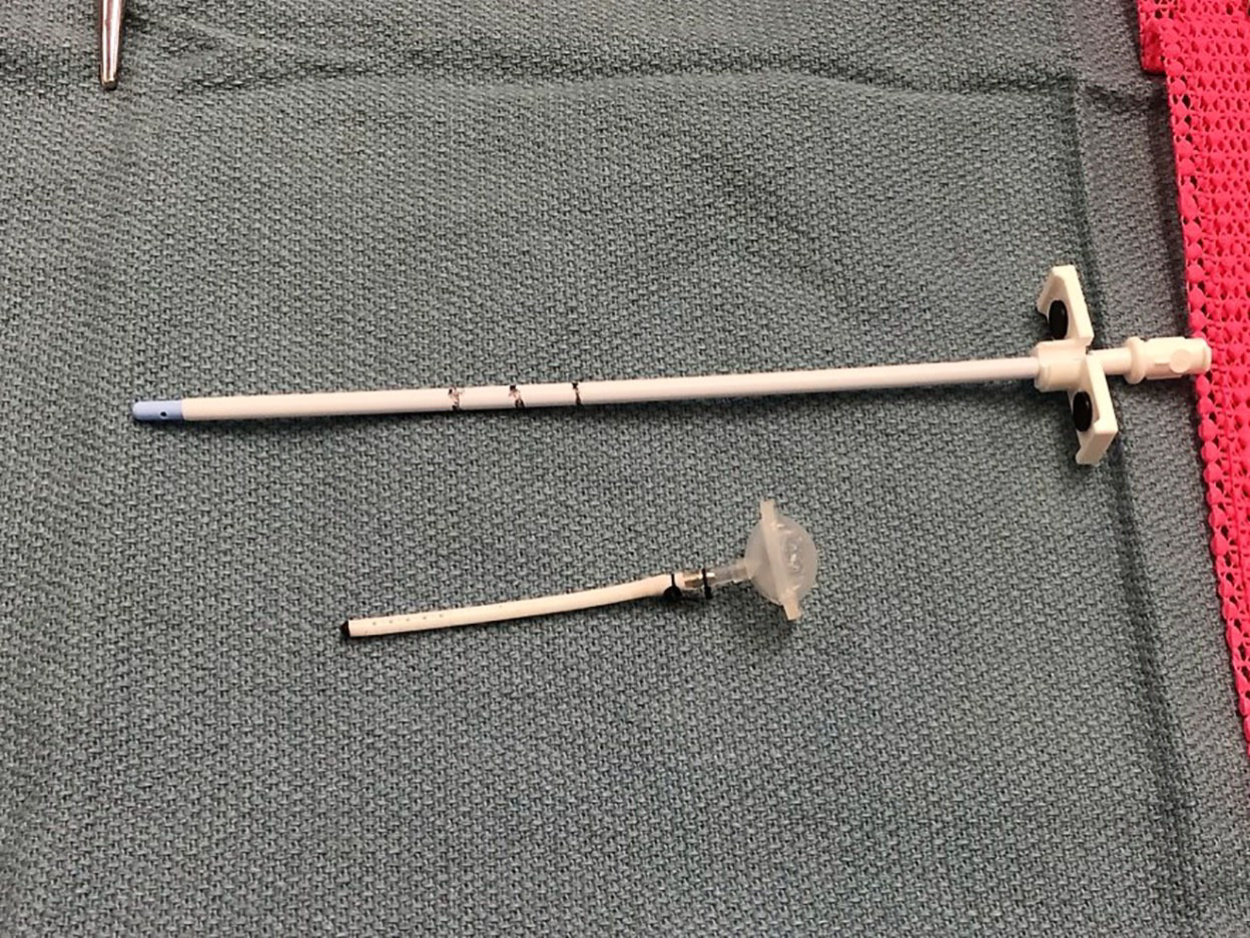
Reservoir secured to a trimmed ventricular catheter with silk ties and a marked peel-away introducer sheath
