= Wasatism =

Approach to Sunni Islamic Law

Wasatism is an approach towards Islamic law, in which one seeks to apply Islam within modern conditions. The movement was led by Yusuf Al-Qaradawi and Mohammed al-Ghazali drawing on the ideas of Rashid Rida and Muhammad Abduh, maintaining that the essence of Islam while harmonizing contrasts such as matter and spirit, individualism and communality, rationality and faith. Qaradawi proposed the approach as constituting a balance between two contradictory positions, proposing a third position.

== Terminology ==
Wasatism (Arabic: وسطية) refers to the strand of Islam which is the via media between traditional, textually-orientated strands such as Madhhabist traditionalism, Salafism and anti-traditional, culturally-orientated strands such as modernism and progressivism.

Yasir Qadhi, an Islamic scholar identified as a Wasatist, has stated that the movement "tries to balance text and context" and "has an interplay between the classical tradition and modernity", seeking to balance textual fidelity to the Qur’an and Sunnah with thoughtful engagement in contemporary social and intellectual contexts. In the same vein, Qadhi has also stated several times that he is post-Madhab, as he confirmed in an interview, reaffirming that he identifies as a “generic Sunni” and doesn’t identify as a “card-carrying member” of any particular maddhab.

== Beliefs ==
Wasatis believe Islam is a religion of facilitation, and aim to produce practical and flexible fatwas that balance text and context and accommodate changing realities in order to make life easier for Muslims and make them fond of their religion, by drawing on all four madhabs and beyond to find the most practical solution

== History ==
Wasatism grew out of the phenomenon of Islamic Modernism propagated by Jamal al-Din al-Afghani. Muhammad Abduh, and Rashid Rida, who sought to reform Muslim society by means of Islam.

In August of 1960, Yusuf Al-Qaradawi wrote "Al-Halal Wal-Haram Fil-Islam" (The Lawful and the Prohibited in Islam) which was his presentation of the Wasati approach to Islamic law dealing with many issues Muslims faced. It was institutionalized by the nineties, and the approach was adopted by various Fiqh Councils established by Qaradawi.

Sami Khatir, a member of Hamas's political bureau, has explained that the movement has always leaned towards the Wasati paradigm, with their Wasati Approach to Islamic law garnering condemnation from Salafi Jihadists.
