= Ayub Ommaya =

Pakistani American neurosurgeon (1930–2008)

Ayub Khan Ommaya
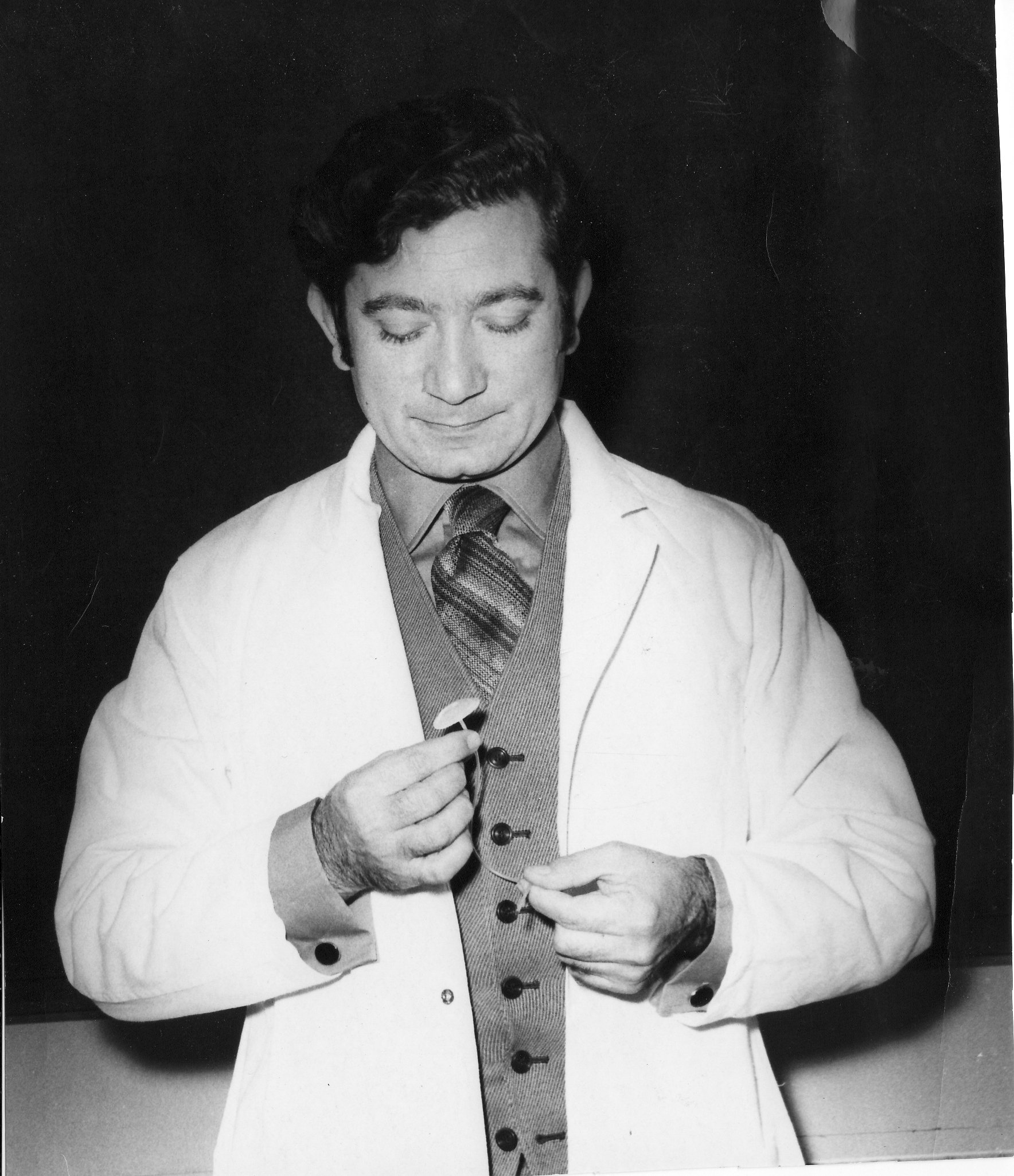
- Ommaya in 1963
- Born: April 14, 1930; Mian Chanu, Punjab, British India
- Died: July 11, 2008 (aged 78); Islamabad, Pakistan
- Occupation: Neurosurgeon
- Known for: Innovative surgeon, Ommaya reservoir

Ayub Khan Ommaya, MD, ScD (hc), FRCS, FACS (1930–2008) was a Pakistani American neurosurgeon and the inventor of the Ommaya reservoir. The reservoir is used to provide chemotherapy directly to the tumor site for brain tumors. Ommaya was also a leading expert in traumatic brain injuries.

Ommaya published over 150 articles, chapters, and books. His research focused on cancer treatment, traumatic brain injury, a CSF artificial organ, and philosophy of mind. Through discussions with Congressman William Lehman Chair of the House Appropriations Committee responsible for the Department of Transportation, he developed CDC's National Center for Injury Prevention and Control, which as part of its mission focuses on traumatic brain injury. As part of this effort Ommaya commissioned the IOM report Injury in America. The report called for the creation of the CDC center.

Ommaya's research provided the experimental data needed to model traumatic brain injury. His Centripetal theory was foundational to the biomechanics of traumatic brain injury. This work allowed for improved modeling of brain injury by engineers in their design of safety equipment in automobiles.

Ommaya also did early work with the computed tomography (CT) scanner. His work with Sir Godfrey Hounsfield to determine the spatial resolution of the CT scanner opened the door for its use in stereotactic surgery. Spinal angiography was also pioneered by Ommaya, Di Chiro, and Doppman. This work allowed for the visualization of arteries and veins and allowed for understanding of spinal cord arteriography. The same team reported the treatment of spinal cord AVMs by percutaneous embolization of an intercostal artery using stainless steel pellets. This was one of the first reports of interventional neuroradiology. Ommaya made several significant contributions to many areas that concern neurological surgeons, treatment of cancer, hydrocephalus, traumatic brain injury, and arterio-venous malformations.

== Professional history ==
Ommaya received his medical degree from King Edward Medical College in Pakistan in 1953 and completed his graduate work in Physiology, Psychology, and Biochemistry at the University of Oxford (Balliol College) as a Rhodes Scholar (M.A.) in 1956. Ommaya won a national swimming competition in Pakistan in 1953 and also established himself as a champion debater and trained as an operatic singer. In 1961, Dr. Ommaya immigrated to the United States. He became a US citizen in 1967. Ommaya received his honorary Doctor of Science degree from Tulane University, School of Engineering Sciences in 1981.

From 1961 to 1980, he joined the staff of the National Institute of Health and became Chief of Neurosurgery, studying treatment of malignant neoplasms, the biomechanics and mechanisms of brain injury, and memory. He also served as Chief Medical Advisor to the U.S. Department of Transportation (National Highway Traffic Safety Administration) from 1980 until 1985. He was a clinical professor at George Washington University from 1980 until 2003. He returned to Pakistan after diagnosis of Alzheimer's disease.

He held patents in devices for drug delivery to the brain, protective systems for neck and head injuries and an artificial organ for treatment of diabetes.

He was Hunterian Professor of the Royal College of Surgeons of England. Ommaya was awarded the Sitara-i-Imtiaz by the President of Pakistan in 1982.

== Neurosurgical career ==
Ommaya completed his neurosurgical training under Dr. Joseph Pennybacker at Nuffield College of Surgical Sciences in London and at the Radcliffe Infirmary in Oxford. After his neurosurgical training, Ommaya came to America and began working as a researcher and clinician at the Surgical Neurology Branch of the NIH. He rose to the rank of Chief of Neurosurgery at the National Institute of Neurological Disorders and Stroke, National Institute of Health. He also was a clinical professor at George Washington University.

Ommaya was well known for his surgical skill and in 1977 he completed a difficult removal of a spinal arteriovenous malformation (AVM) which received attention in the press. During the 18-hour operation the patient was placed in total body hypothermia and total circulatory arrest for 45 minutes. The hypothermia was needed to slow metabolism and protect the brain and organs from reduced oxygen supply while Ommaya surgically embolized and removed an AVM which was located near the medulla. Ommaya was the honorary physician to the President of Pakistan. Ommaya also appeared with Peter Ustinov, Nick Nolte and Susan Sarandon in the movie Lorenzo's Oil released in 1992.

== Many firsts ==
Ommaya's invention, the Ommaya reservoir, was the first subcutaneous reservoir that allowed for repeated intrathecal injections. Before his invention patients had to suffer repeated lumbar punctures for intrathecal drug administration. Spinal angiography was pioneered by Ommaya, Di Chiro, and Doppman. This work allowed for the visualization of arteries and veins and allowed for understanding of spinal cord arteriography. The same team reported the treatment of spinal cord AVMs by percutaneous embolization of an intercostal artery using stainless steel pellets. This was one of the first reports of interventional neuroradiology.

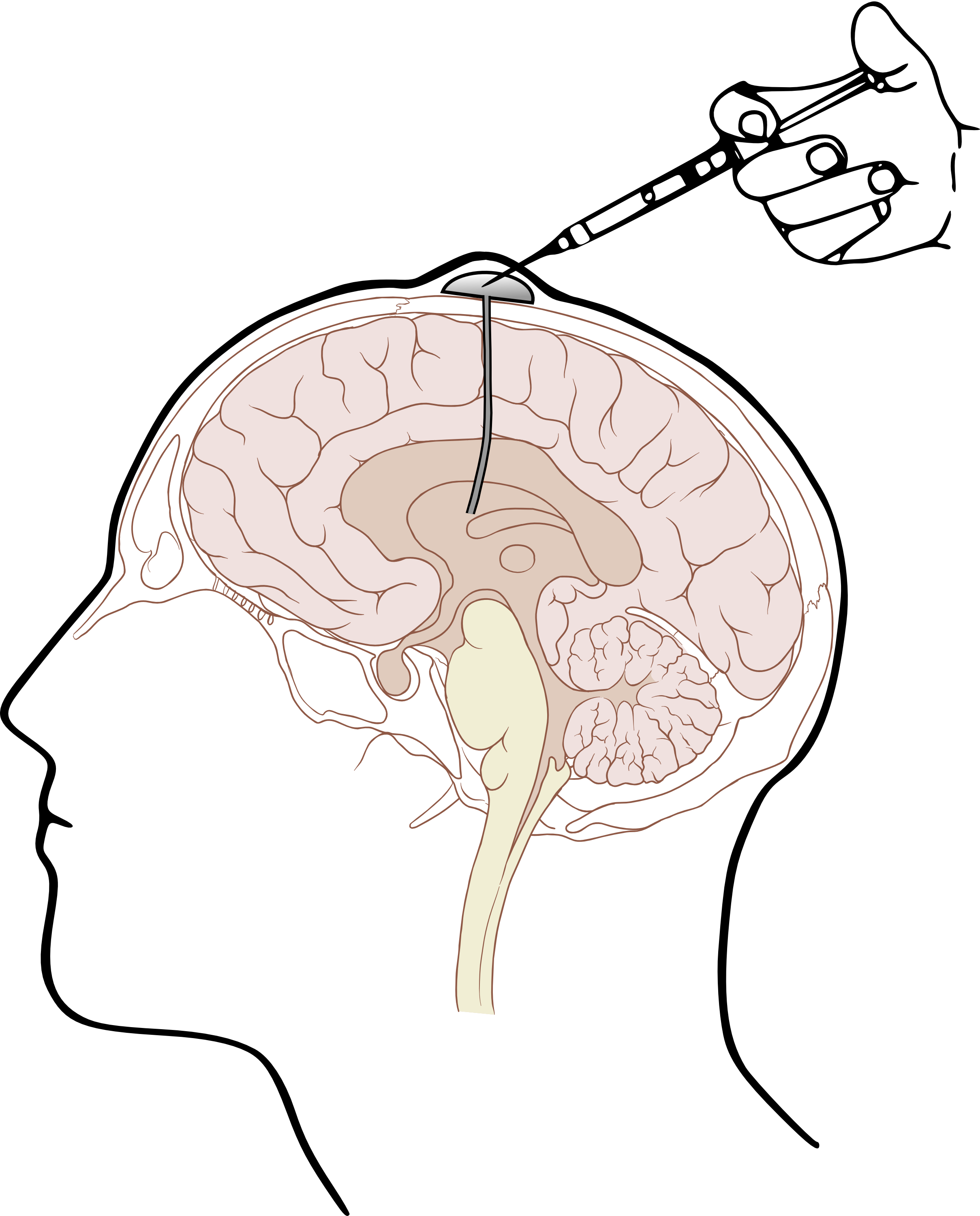
Ommaya reservoir

Ommaya's models and work in traumatic injury were foundational to the biomechanics of traumatic brain injury. This work allowed for improved modeling of brain injury by engineers in their design of safety equipment in automobiles. Ommaya also published the first coma score for classification of traumatic brain injury. The most widely used contemporary classification systems follow the Ommaya approach. Ommaya's friendship with Congressman Lehman, then chair of the House Appropriations Subcommittee on Transportation, lead to the creation of the National Center for Injury Prevention and Control.

Ommaya worked with Sir Godfrey Hounsfield to determine the spatial resolution of the CT scanner which opened the door for its use in stereotactic surgery. Ommaya also invented the first spinal fluid driven artificial organ.

== Interventional neuroradiology ==
The work of Di Chiro, Doppman and Ommaya was critical to the development of spinal angiography. The visualization of arteries and veins allowed for understanding of the pathophysiology of spinal AVMs in addition to classification of lesions. Di Chiro, Ommaya and Doppman also reported one of the earliest interventional radiology approaches using stainless steel pellets to treat a spinal cord AVM. This percutaneous embolization approach was noted as less traumatic than surgical treatment by the authors and represented another step forward in percutaneous vascular embolization as an addition the surgical armamentarium for treating certain vascular disorders of the central nervous system.

== CSF rhinorrhea ==
Before Ommaya's work, CSF rhinorrhea was classified as either traumatic or spontaneous. The second category was essentially a catch-all category which did not assist in guiding treatment approaches. Ommaya classified non-traumatic rhinorrhea as resulting from either high pressure leaks (tumors and hydrocephalus) or "normal" leaks (congenital abnormalities, focal atrophy, osteomyelitis). Non-traumatic rhinorrhea is a challenge in diagnosis and choice of surgical approach. Of importance to successful surgical outcome is the demonstration of fistula. Within the non-traumatic category, CSF rhinorrhea occurring with primary empty sella (PES) was first reported by Ommaya.

== Biomechanics of traumatic brain injury ==
Ommaya's centripetal theory identified that the effects of TBI always begin at the surface of the brain in mild injury and extend inward to affect the diencephalic-mesencephalic core in more severe injury. His work showed that both translational and rotational acceleration produce focal lesions but that only rotational acceleration produced diffuse axonal injury. When damage is found in the rostral brainstem it is also associated with diffuse hemispheric damage. Prior to his work it was believed that the mechanism of concussion was linked to primary brainstem injury. However, the brainstem and mesencephalon are the last structure to be affected in severe injury, and rotational rather than translational forces produce concussion. Contact phenomena contribute to the development of focal lesions, e.g. frontal and temporal lesions due to contact with the sphenoid bone. Magnetic resonance imaging (MRI) studies have supported these theories. They have confirmed that the distribution of lesions follows a centripetal pattern that follows injury severity identified by the Glasgow Coma Score.

== Ommaya reservoir ==
Ommaya invented the Ommaya reservoir in 1963. The reservoir is a subcutaneous implant for repeated intrathecal injections, to treat hydrocephalus and malignant tumors. The reservoir was the first medical port to use silicone, which is biologically inert and self-sealing. The Ommaya reservoir allows delivery of intermittent bolus injections for chemotherapy to the tumor bed. Agents are injected percutaneously into the reservoir and delivered to the tumor by compression of the reservoir.

== Creation of the National Center for Injury Prevention and Control ==
While the Chief Medical Advisor for the Department of Transportation, Ommaya commissioned a report, Injury in America, from the Institute of Medicine (IOM) in 1985. This report and efforts by Congressman William Lehman and Ommaya led to the creation of the Center for Disease Control's National Center for Injury Prevention and Control, which began to provide synthesis, direction, and funding for the field. Lehman and Ommaya became friends when Ommaya cared for Lehman's daughter. They had many discussions focusing on the need for a center that emphasized injury prevention and research. Lehman, then chair of the House Appropriations Subcommittee on Transportation, was responsible for the initial $10 million awarded to the CDC to establish a new Center for Injury Control. The FY 2020 budget for the center is $677 Million, and it funds basic and applied injury research. Ommaya served on the National Advisory Committee for the center for 15 years.

== Spinal fluid-driven artificial organ ==
Motivated by his personal experience with the disease, Ommaya focused on the problem of transplantation of islet cells for the treatment of diabetes. A major challenge facing survival of islet cells is immune rejection. Ommaya thought that the CSF would provide an ideal setting for transplanted islets due to the immune protection provided by the blood-brain barrier. He developed an artificial organ which would house transplanted islets, and the cells could be nourished by the CSF. Ommaya, Illani Atwater, and colleagues identified that ventricular-peritoneal CSF shunts provided an immune protected site for the transplantation of mouse and rat islets in dogs and llamas. Ommaya and colleagues also identified that CSF glucose mirrors blood glucose. Islets cells were able to survive in this system and function in the llama model, but further work on the model is needed.

== The role of emotions in consciousness ==
Ommaya focused much of his career on the study of consciousness, the brain, and mind. This interest derived from his reading of Pennfield's work on surgical treatment of epilepsy. His work in traumatic brain injury was influenced by his interest in how consciousness is altered and how it recovers after traumatic injury. Key to his observations is the role of the limbic system and emotion as foundational for consciousness. In his view, emotion is the trigger to action and other aspects of rationality are tools to justify action. Ommaya saw consciousness as an emergent property of the brain. Consciousness is the result of evolutionary forces directed to improving the efficiency of mental function where the limbic system plays a key role.

Ommaya's TBI research emphasize its fundamental inseparability of rational thought and emotion. Ommaya defined four steps in the evolution of consciousness: 1) reflex and avoidance reactions; 2) sensory inputs merged with multisensory neurons in the mesencephalon; 3) interactions formed between sensory and limbic systems and memory; and 4) reinforcement of thalamic neural centers which relays information between sensory and motor centers.

== Personal life ==
He is survived by his wife Ghazala and his six children.

Ommaya was featured in the article "The Muslims who shaped America – from brain surgeons to rappers" A review article published in 2017 highlights his academic and neurosurgical contributions.

On July 13, 2008, Pakistan's Dawn newspaper reported his death, and called him a "trailblazing Pakistani surgeon", followed by West European and US publications.
