= Souleiman Ghali =

Souleiman Ghali is an American-Muslim leader and former head and a founder of the Islamic Society of San Francisco.

== Biography ==
He supports dialogue between the faith communities and works to raise consciousness about Islam and bring Muslims, Christians, and Jews together. Born in Beirut, Lebanon, he came to the U.S. as a college student, and holds a degree in Activism and Social Change.

He is a speaker and lecturer about Islam at churches, synagogues, universities and businesses, and has spoken at the Commonwealth Club and the World Affairs Council.

== Controversy ==
The Islamic Society of San Francisco (ISSF) was the subject of a wrongful termination lawsuit by Safwat Morsy, an imam he had hired for his mosque but later fired for preaching radical ideology. Morsy maintained that he had been terminated for reporting accounting irregularities at the mosque, and was awarded $400,000 in damages by a jury in San Francisco Superior Court.
