= AlMaghrib Institute =

Islamic studies institute

- Formation: 2001; 25 years ago
- Founder: Muhammad Alshareef
- Type: 501(c)(3) organization
- Tax ID no.: 27-0091991
- Region served: United States
- Products: Seminars
- Key people: Yasir Qadhi
- Website: www.almaghrib.org

AlMaghrib Institute is a 501(c)(3) Islamic studies organization founded in Houston, Texas, by Muhammad AlShareef in 2002. AlMaghrib provides courses on Islam in a six-day, two-weekend intensive seminar and other courses in a shorter, three-day, single-weekend format.

== Instructors ==
Most of AlMaghrib instructors are graduates of the Islamic University of Madinah, which is why AlMaghrib is characterized as Salafi in ideological orientation, despite founder Muhammad AlShareef's commitment not to use labels other than "Islam" and "Muslim".

AlMaghrib's instructors include the following Islamic scholars, who are listed on AlMaghrib's website.

- Yasir Qadhi
- Omar Suleiman
- Abu Eesa Niamatullah

== Academics ==
AlMaghrib's founders are working toward establishing an M.A. and Ph.D.-granting Islamic seminary with a permanent campus in the United States, featuring teachers as full-time faculty.

== Responses ==
AlMaghrib has received a significant amount of public scrutiny because recordings by Anwar al-Awlaki, the highest English-speaking cleric in Al-Qaeda, continued to be sold at AlMaghrib events, although AlMaghrib banned these in 2009.

In addition, analysts have studied students of the Institute who were later involved in terrorist actions or plots, and speculated about the teachings of the Institute. Umar Farouk Abdulmutallab, who in December 2009 attempted to detonate plastic explosives on board Northwest Airlines Flight 253 from Amsterdam to Detroit, was found to have taken a class at the AlMaghrib Institute in Houston. Abdulmutallab claimed that al-Awlaki had also been a student at AlMaghrib.

"It's ironic that he came to us," said instructor Yasir Qadhi of AbdulMutallab. Qadhi told CNN, "At some level, we did not convince him of the validity of our views," and "that is cause for regret".

The following former students at the Institute were later implicated in illicit activities: Daniel Maldonado, a convert to Islam, was convicted in 2007 of training in Somalia with a group linked to Al Qaeeda militia. Tarek Mehanna, a pharmacist, was convicted for conspiracy, in a case widely criticized by journalists and civil libertarians. Two young American men were held in Pakistan in 2009 for seeking to train with militants.

On the other hand, some other American Salafi groups have accused AlMaghrib of being "liberal" and "apolitical." As a result of this external and internal scrutiny, AlMaghrib has attempted to change its image and avoided the public use of any classification as "Salafi". AlMaghrib Vice President, Waleed Basyouni, said "[AlMaghrib] institute's stance against extremism, violence and other related subjects has always been clear ... We unequivocally condemn it in all its forms."

Alshareef has been banned from entering Denmark.

== See also ==
- Islam in Houston
