= Tahera Rahman =

American newscaster

- Born: January 24, 1991 (age 34); Chicago, Illinois, U.S.
- Occupation(s): News producer Newscaster

Tahera Shireen Rahman (born January 24, 1991) is an American newscaster who is known for becoming the first full-time hijabi Muslim broadcast newscaster in the United States, on February 8, 2018, for WHBF-TV after previously working for the station as a producer.

== Early life and education ==
Rahman was born to Pakistani and Indian immigrants outside of Chicago. She attended Loyola University Chicago earning a Bachelor of Arts in journalism and international studies. Rahman was also the first Muslim to hold the position of Editor in Chief of Loyola's weekly student paper, the Loyola Phoenix.

== Career ==
Tahera Rahman's first job where she was trained as producer and a host was at the daily Radio Islam show at WCEV 1450 AM in Chicago which was produced by Sound Vision Foundation from 1999 to 2019. She worked for WHBF-TV and KLJB until September 27, 2019, and currently works for KXAN-TV in Austin, Texas.
