= Dalia Mogahed =

American scholar on the Middle East (born 1975)

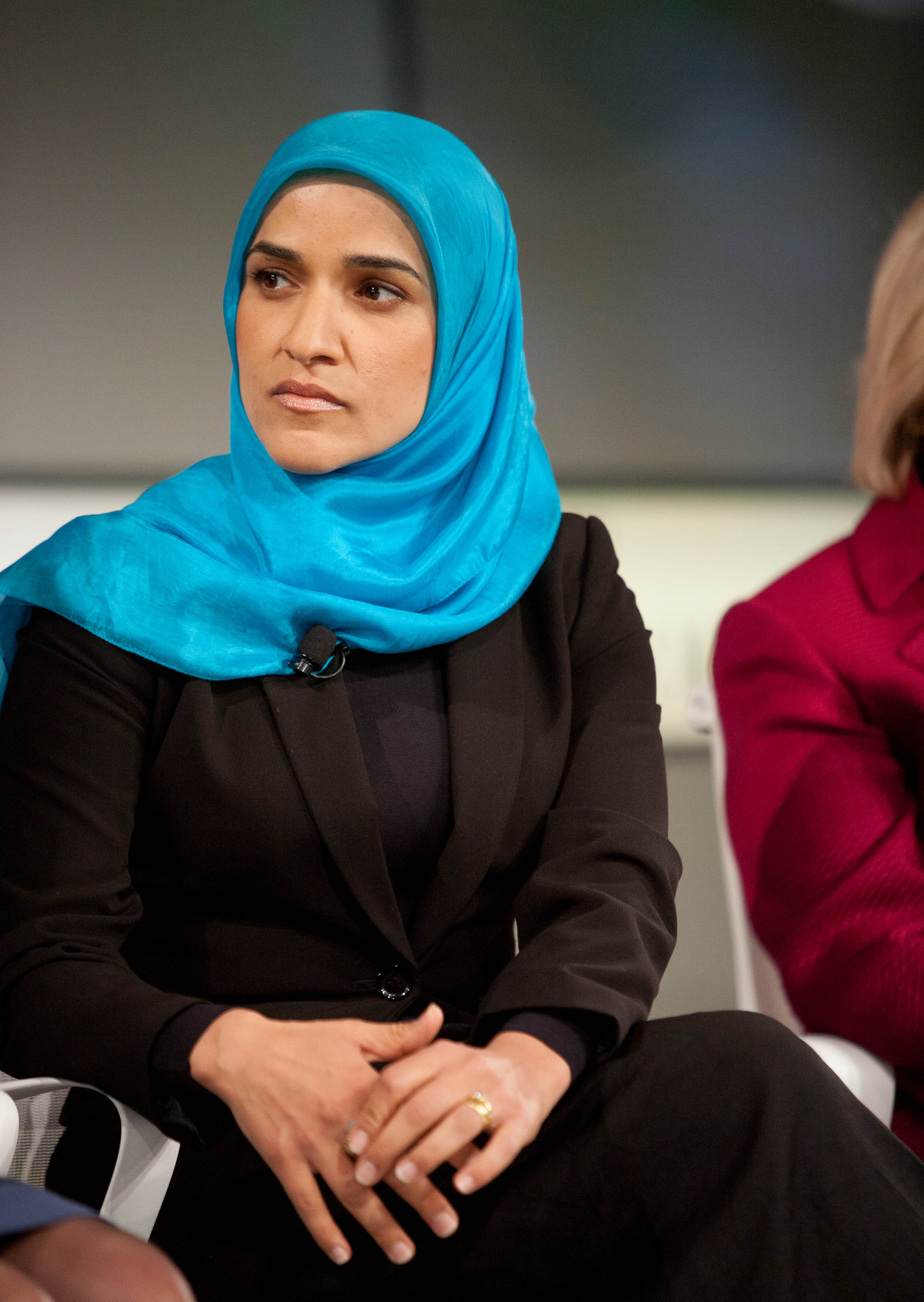
- Born: 1975 (age 50–51); Cairo, Egypt
- Education: University of Wisconsin-Madison (BS); University of Pittsburgh (MBA)
- Occupation: Director of Research at the Institute for Social Policy and Understanding
- Known for: Scholarship and Research on American Muslims
- Relatives: Yasmin Mogahed (sister)

Dalia Mogahed (born 1975) is an American researcher and consultant. She is the director of research at the Institute for Social Policy and Understanding (ISPU) in Washington, D.C. She is also President and CEO of Mogahed Consulting, a Washington, D.C.–based executive coaching and consulting firm specializing in Muslim societies and the Middle East. Mogahed is former executive director of the Gallup Center for Muslim Studies, a non-partisan research center that provided data and analysis to reflect the views of Muslims all over the world. She was selected as an advisor by U.S. President Barack Obama on the White House Office of Faith-Based and Neighborhood Partnerships.

== Early life and education ==
Mogahed was born in Cairo, Egypt, and immigrated to the United States at the age of four. She received her undergraduate degree in chemical engineering with a minor in Arabic from the University of Wisconsin-Madison. Upon graduation, Mogahed joined the marketing department of Procter & Gamble. She subsequently received her MBA from the Joseph M. Katz Graduate School of Business at the University of Pittsburgh.

== Career and influence ==
She is the director of research at the Institute for Social Policy and Understanding (ISPU), a Washington, D.C. and Dearborn, Michigan–based Muslim research organization. Prior to ISPU, Dalia Mogahed chaired the Gallup Center for Muslim Studies from 2006 to 2012, which conducted research and gathered statistics on Muslims throughout the world. She was selected as an advisor by U.S. President Barack Obama on the White House Office of Faith-Based and Neighborhood Partnerships.

Mogahed was invited to testify before the U.S. Senate Committee on Foreign Relations about U.S. engagement with Muslim communities and was a significant contributor to the Homeland Security Advisory Council's Countering Violent Extremism Working Group. She worked with Madeleine Albright and Dennis Ross on the U.S.-Muslim Engagement Project to produce policy recommendations—many of which were adopted by the Obama administration.

She is a board member and a leader in the World Economic Forum's Global Agenda Council on the Arab World. She is also a nonresident public policy analyst at Issam Fares Institute for Public Policy and International Affairs at the American University of Beirut.

== Recognition and publications ==
Arabian Business magazine recognized Mogahed in 2010, 2011, 2012 and 2013 as one of the most influential Arab women and The Royal Islamic Strategic Studies Centre included Mogahed in its 2009 and 2010 lists of the 500 most influential Muslims. Ashoka: Innovators for the Public named her the Arab World's Social Innovator of the Year in 2010, and the University of Wisconsin Alumni Association recognized her with its "Forward Under 40" award for outstanding contributions by a graduate of the university.

She and John Esposito co-authored the book Who Speaks For Islam?: What a Billion Muslims Really Think, based on six years of research and more than 50,000 interviews representing Muslims in more than 35 predominantly Muslim countries. Accounting for more than 90% of the world's Muslim community, this poll is the largest, most comprehensive study of its kind. Mogahed later appeared as a commentator in the PBS documentary Inside Islam: What a Billion Muslims Really Think (2010), which was based on the book.

Mogahed's analysis has appeared in the Wall Street Journal, Foreign Policy magazine, the Harvard International Review, the Middle East Policy Journal, and other publications.

In 2019, Mogahed was recognized in a list of "200 people who best embody the spirit and work of Frederick Douglass, one of the most influential figures in history" by the Frederick Douglass Family Initiatives and the Antiracist Research and Policy Center at American University in collaboration with The Guardian.

== Controversy ==
In 2009, during a phone interview with a London-based TV show hosted by Ibtihal Bsis Ismail, a member of Hizb ut Tahrir, Mogahed responded to a question about the support for sharia among women in the Muslim world which she observed in her research by arguing that "the reason so many women support Sharia is because they have a very different understanding of sharia than the common perception in Western media. The majority of women around the world associate gender justice, or justice for women, with sharia compliance. The portrayal of Sharia has been oversimplified in many cases." Mogahed later stated that she would not have agreed to the interview had she known about the program's affiliation and that she believed Ismail had misled her team "to score propaganda points for an ideological movement".

== Views ==
Mogahed rejects as unjustified calls for Muslims to condemn Islamic terrorism, arguing that there have been "many" such condemnations and that the demand "unfairly implies" that Muslims would support atrocities committed by other Muslims on account of their faith. Mogahed compares this with public attitudes to terrorist attacks committed by white Christians, noting that in these cases, "we don't suspect other people who share their faith and ethnicity of condoning them".

=== Freedom of speech ===
In 2020, in the context of violent demonstrations held in some Muslim countries against France for refusing to ban cartoons depicting the prophet of Islam, Mogahed asserted that such caricatures were "the equivalent of the N-word" or "blackface", and were likewise “racial slurs” targeting “a vulnerable [...] and demonized community”. She added that it was "completely disingenuous" of France to project the idea that "it is all open and anyone can say anything they want” whereas, for example, Holocaust denial is criminalized and wearing a hijab (Muslim headscarf, which some Muslims may view as a form of “self-expression”) is banned in French schools. According to Mogahed, the defense of free speech by the French government, in particular the right to draw cartoons and poke fun at religious dogma, amounts to the imposition of a “state religion” that she calls "French Republic nationalism".
