= Islam by country =

Population of Muslims by country

World Muslim population by percentage (Pew Research Center, 2020)

Adherents of Islam constitute the world's second largest and fastest growing major religious grouping, maintaining suggested 2017 projections in 2022. As of 2020, Pew Research Center (PEW) projections suggest there are a total of 2 billion adherents worldwide, representing 25.6% of the world population. Further studies indicate that the global spread and percentage growth of Islam is primarily due to relatively high birth rates and a youthful age structure. Conversion to Islam does not have much impact on the overall growth of the Muslim population, as the number of people converting to Islam is roughly equal to the number of those leaving the faith. According to another study published in 2015 by PEW, Islam is expected to experience a modest gain of 3 million adherents through religious conversion between 2010 and 2050, although this modest impact will make Islam, compared with other religions, the second largest religion in terms of net gains through religious conversion after religiously unaffiliated.

Most Muslims fall under either of three main branches:

- Sunni (85–90%, roughly 1.7–1.8 billion people)
- Shia (10–15%, roughly 200–300 million people)
- Ibadi (0.16–0.37%, roughly 3–7 million people)

In 2020, there were 53 Muslim-majority countries. Islam is the majority religion in several subregions: Central Asia, West Asia, Southeast Asia, North Africa, West Africa, the Sahel, and the Middle East.

The diverse Asia-Pacific region contains the highest number of Muslims in the world, surpassing the combined Middle East and North Africa (MENA). Around 62% of the world's Muslims live in the Asia-Pacific region (from Turkey to Indonesia), with over one billion adherents. Asia hosts the world's four largest domestic populations, starting with Indonesia at 12.7% of the world, followed by Pakistan (11.1%), then India (10.9%), and Bangladesh (9.2%).

Africa has the 5th and 6th largest populations in Nigeria (5.3%) and Egypt (4.9%). The Middle East hosts 7th and 8th with both Iran and Turkey holding an estimated 4.6%. Only about 20% of Muslims live in the Arab world.

== Regional comparisons ==
South Asia has the largest population of Muslims in the world, with about one-third of all Muslims being from South Asia. Islam is the dominant religion in the Maldives, Afghanistan, Pakistan, and Bangladesh. India is the country with the largest Muslim population outside Muslim-majority countries with more than 200 million adherents.

The Middle East-North Africa (MENA) region hosts 23% of the world's Muslims, and Islam is the dominant religion in every country in the region other than Israel and Cyprus.

The country with the single largest population of Muslims is Indonesia in Southeast Asia, which on its own hosts 13% of the world's Muslims. Together, the Muslims in the countries of Southeast Asia constitute the world's third-largest population of Muslims. In the countries of the Malay Archipelago, Muslims are in the majority in Brunei, Indonesia, and Malaysia.

About 15% of Muslims reside in Sub-Saharan Africa, and sizeable Muslim communities are also found in the Americas, Russia, China and Europe.

Western Europe hosts many Muslim immigrant communities where Islam is the second-largest religion after Christianity, where it represents 6% of the total population or 24 million people.

== Denominations ==
Islam is divided into two major denominations, Sunni and Shia. Of the total Muslim population, 87–90% are Sunni and 10–13% are Shi'a. Most Shias (between 68% and 80%) live in mainly four countries: Iran, Azerbaijan, Bahrain, and Iraq. Furthermore, there are concentrated Shi'a populations in Lebanon, Russia, China, Pakistan, Bangladesh, and 10 sub-Saharan African countries. The major surviving Imamah-Muslim Sects are Usulism (with around 8.5% of the total Muslim population), Nizari Ismailism (with around 1%) and Alevism (with slightly more than 0.5% but less than 1%). The other existing groups include Zaydis of Yemen whose population is around 0.5% of the world's Muslim population, Musta'li Ismaili (with nearly 0.1% whose Tayyibi adherents reside in Sindh and Gujarat in South Asia. There are also significant diaspora populations in Europe, North America, the Far East, and East Africa), and Ibadis from the Kharijites whose population has diminished to a level below 0.15%. (with around 1%), non-denominational Muslims, Quranist Muslims and Wahhabis (with around 1–2% of the world's total Muslim population) also exist.

A study from the Pew Research Center (PEW) in 2012 found that many Muslims (one out of five in 22 Muslim majority countries) identify as non-denominational or "just a Muslim". This non-denominational affiliation is most common in Southern and Eastern Europe as well as Central Asia, with minority populations in Southeast Asia and sub-Saharan Africa. The study found that a median percentage of 74% of Muslims in Kazakhstan, 65% in Albania, 64% in Kyrgyzstan, 56% in Indonesia, 55% in Mali, and 40% in Cameroon identify this way. However, it is much less common in parts of Africa, the Middle East, and South Asia.

== Countries ==
As of 2020, there were 53 Muslim-majority countries, which was the same number as in 2010. Most of the percentages of Muslim populations of each country shown below, if not stated otherwise, were taken from the study by the Pew Research Center (PEW) report of 5 facts about the Muslim population in Europe, 2017.

=== Table ===
Country/Region	Total Population	Muslim Population	Percentage in Country (%)	Percentage of world (%)	Sources
Afghanistan	37,135,000	37,098,000	99.9	2.0	
Albania	2,402,113	1,217,362	50.7	0.1	
Algeria	47,000,000	46,500,000	99.0	2.7	
American Samoa	50,826	0	0	0	
Andorra	85,708	2,228	2.6	< 0.1	
Angola	30,355,880	90,000	0.3	< 0.1	
Anguilla	17,422	< 1,000	0.6	< 0.1	
Antigua and Barbuda	84,816	208	0.25	< 0.1	
Argentina	44,694,198	400,000	0.9	< 1.0	
Armenia	3,038,217	500	0.02	< 0.1	
Aruba	116,576	< 1,000	0.4	< 0.1	
Australia	25,700,000	813,392	3.2	< 0.1	
Austria	8,935,800	745,600	8.3	< 0.1	
Azerbaijan	10,353,296	10,073,758	97.3	0.5	
Bahamas	332,634	< 1,000	0.1	< 0.1	
Bahrain	1,501,635	1,111,533	74.0	< 0.1	
Bangladesh	165,200,000	150,800,000	91.0	9.2	
Barbados	293,131	4,396	1.5	< 0.1	
Belarus	9,527,543	8,445	0.08	0	
Belgium	11,570,762	879,377	7.6	< 0.1	
Belize	397,483	484	0.1	< 0.1	
Benin	11,340,504	3,141,319	27.7	0.14	
Bermuda	71,176	< 1,000	1.0	< 0.1	
Bhutan	766,397	0	0	0	
Bolivia	11,306,341	2,000	< 0.1	< 0.1	
Bosnia and Herzegovina	3,849,891	1,955,084	50.7	0.1	
Botswana	2,249,104	8,996	0.4	< 0.1	
Brazil	210,000,000	35,167 – 1,500,000	0.02 – 0.7	< 0.1	
British Virgin Islands	35,802	< 1,000	1.2	< 0.1	
Brunei	462,721	379,894	82.1	< 0.1	
Bulgaria	7,057,504	861,015	13.4	< 0.1	
Burkina Faso	21,382,659	13,513,840	63.8	0.6	
Burundi	11,844,520	1,184,452	10.0	< 0.1	
Cambodia	15,552,211	311,044	2.0	< 0.1	
Cameroon	30,987,821	9,482,273	30.6	0.4	
Canada	36,328,480	1,775,715	4.9	0.1	
Cape Verde	568,373	11,367	2.0	< 0.1	
Cayman Islands	59,613	< 1,000	0.2	< 0.1	
Central African Republic	5,745,062	861,759	15.0	< 0.1	
Chad	19,093,595	10,520,570	55.1	0.4	
Chile	17,925,262	4,000	< 0.1	< 0.1	
China	1,390,000,000	6,255,000 – 50,000,000	0.45 – 3.0	0.4 – 2.8	
Cocos (Keeling) Islands	593	389	66.0	< 0.1	
Colombia	48,168,996	96,337	0.2	< 0.1	
Comoros	821,164	807,204	98.3	< 0.1	
DR Congo	116,000,000	1,800,000	1.5	< 0.1	
Cook Islands	9,038	< 1,000	< 0.1	< 0.1	
Costa Rica	4,987,142	1500	< 0.1	< 0.1	
Ivory Coast	26,260,582	11,265,789	42.9	0.5	
Croatia	3,871,833	50,981	1.3	< 0.1	
Cuba	11,116,396	11,116	0.1	< 0.1	
Cyprus	1,100,000	275,000	25.3	< 0.1	
Czech Republic	10,686,269	10,000 – 20,000	0.1 – 0.2	< 0.1	
Denmark	5,809,502	313,713	5.4	< 0.1	
Djibouti	1,003,800	998,273	99.4	0.1	
Dominica	74,027	< 1,000	0.2	< 0.1	
Dominican Republic	10,298,756	2,000	< 0.1	< 0.1	
Ecuador	16,498,502	< 1,000	< 0.1	< 0.1	
Egypt	95,000,000	85,000,000 – 90,000,000	90.0 – 94.7	4.9	
El Salvador	6,187,271	18,000	0.28	< 0.1	
Equatorial Guinea	1,795,834	71,833	4.0	< 0.1	
Eritrea	6,000,000	2,160,000 – 3,100,000	51.6	0.1	
Estonia	1,244,288	1,508	< 0.1	< 0.1	
Eswatini	300,000	6000	2.0	< 0.1	
Ethiopia	110,871,031	34,702,632	31.3	1.8	
Faroe Islands	37,965	23	0.06	< 0.1	
Falkland Islands	3,198	0	0	0	
Federated States of Micronesia	103,643	< 1,000	< 0.1	< 0.1	
Fiji	926,276	58,355	6.3	< 0.1	
Finland	5,608,000	140,000	2.5	< 0.1	
France	66,792,845	6,939,136	10.38	0.3	
French Guiana	281,612	2,400	0.9	< 0.1	
French Polynesia	290,373	< 1,000	< 0.1	< 0.1	
Gabon	2,119,036	211,903	10.0	< 0.1	
Gambia	2,413,403	2,283,080	96.4	0.1	
Georgia	3,713,804	398,677	10.7	< 0.1	
Germany	83,100,000	5,600,000	6.7	0.2	
Ghana	32,372,889	6,442,205	19.9	0.2	
Gibraltar	32,194	1,166	3.6	< 0.1	
Greece	10,761,523	313,406	3.7	< 0.1	
Greenland	57,691	1	0	0	
Grenada	112,207	< 1,000	0.3	< 0.1	
Guadeloupe	402,119	2,000	0.4	< 0.1	
Guam	167,772	< 1,000	< 0.1	< 0.1	
Guatemala	16,581,273	1,200	< 0.1	< 0.1	
Guinea	11,855,411	10,563,171	89.1	0.5	
Guinea-Bissau	1,976,187	911,023	46.1	< 0.1	
Guyana	740,685	55,000	7.3	< 0.1	
Haiti	10,788,440	5,000	< 0.1	< 0.1	
Honduras	9,182,766	30,000	0.3	< 0.1	
Hong Kong	7,213,338	295,746	4.1	< 0.1	
Hungary	9,825,704	40,000 – 60,000	0.4 – 0.6	< 0.1	
Iceland	343,518	< 1,000	0.2	< 0.1	
India	1,370,000,000	200,000,000	14.6	10.9	
Indonesia	286,700,000	249,800,000	87.1	12.2	
Iran	85,961,000	85,700,000	99.8	4.6	
Iraq	40,462,701	38,439,566 – 39,653,447	95.0 – 98.0	1.9	
Ireland	5,068,050	70,952	1.4	< 0.1	
Isle of Man	84,069	393	0.5	< 0.1	
Israel	8,424,904	1,516,482	18.0	0.1	
Italy	62,246,674	2,987,840	4.8	0.1	
Jamaica	2,812,090	5,624	0.2	< 0.1	
Japan	126,000,000	185,000	0.1	< 0.1	
Jordan	10,458,413	10,165,577	97.2	0.4	
Kazakhstan	18,744,548	13,158,672	70.2	0.5	
Kenya	48,397,527	5,500,000	11.2	0.2	
Kiribati	109,367	< 1,000	< 0.1	< 0.1	
Kosovo	1,585,566	1,482,276	93.5	0.1	
Kuwait	2,916,467	2,175,684	74.6	0.2	
Kyrgyzstan	6,500,000	5,200,000 – 5,850,000	90.0	0.3	
Laos	7,234,171	1,000	< 0.1	< 0.1	
Latvia	1,923,559	2,000	0.1 – 0.2	< 0.1	
Lebanon	5,261,372	3,567,211	67.8	0.2	
Lesotho	1,962,461	3,000	0.1	< 0.1	
Liberia	4,809,768	961,953	20.0	< 0.1	
Libya	6,754,507	6,551,871	97.0	0.4	
Liechtenstein	38,000	2,050	5.4	< 0.1	
Lithuania	2,793,284	3,000	0.1	< 0.1	
Luxembourg	640,000	15,000	2.3	< 0.1	
Macau	606,340	< 1,000	0.1	< 0.1	
Madagascar	25,683,610	2,568,361	10.0	< 0.1	
Malawi	19,842,560	3,968,512	20.0	0.1	
Malaysia	32,730,000	20,063,500	63.5	1.1	
Maldives	374,775	374,775	100.0	< 0.1	
Mali	21,347,587	20,541,904	96.2	0.8	
Malta	449,043	11,675	2.6	< 0.1	
Marshall Islands	75,684	< 1,000	< 0.1	< 0.1	
Martinique	385,551	< 1,000	0.2	< 0.1	
Mauritania	4,161,925	4,157,425	99.9	0.2	
Mauritius	1,364,283	236,020	17.3	< 0.1	
Mayotte	256,518	253,439	97.0	< 0.1	
Mexico	127,000,000	5,500	0.01	< 0.01	
Moldova	3,437,720	15,000	0.4	< 0.1	
Monaco	30,727	< 1,000	0.8	< 0.1	
Mongolia	3,103,428	150,000	5.0	< 0.1	
Montenegro	614,249	122,849	19.1	< 0.1	
Montserrat	5,315	< 1,000	0.1	< 0.1	
Morocco	36,738,229	36,370,847	99.0	2.1	
Mozambique	30,888,034	5,837,839	18.9	0.3	
Myanmar	55,622,506	2,391,767	4.3	0.1	
Namibia	2,413,643	9,654	0.4	< 0.1	
Nauru	10,084	< 1,000	< 0.1	< 0.1	
Nepal	29,218,867	1,292,909	4.2	0.1	
Netherlands	17,400,000	387,000	5.0	0.1	
Netherlands Antilles	304,759	< 1,000	0.2	< 0.1	
New Caledonia	278,500	7,000	2.8	< 0.1	
New Zealand	4,993,923	75,144	1.5	< 0.1	
Nicaragua	6,284,757	1,000	< 0.1	< 0.1	
Niger	21,466,863	21,101,926	98.3	1.0	
Nigeria	240,000,000	110,000,000 – 120,000,000	47.0 – 49.0	5.3	
Niue	1,611	0	0	0	
North Korea	25,610,672	3,000	0.1	< 0.1	
North Macedonia	1,836,713	590,878	32.2	< 0.1	
Northern Mariana Islands	56,200	< 1,000	0.7	< 0.1	
Norway	5,328,212	175,507	3.2	< 0.1	
Oman	4,633,752	2,427,000	86.0	0.2	
Pakistan	241,500,000	233,000,000	96.5	11.79	
Palau	17,900	500	3.8	< 0.1	
Palestine	4,780,978	4,298,000	97.5	0.3	
Panama	4,158,783	25,000	0.7	< 0.1	
Papua New Guinea	8,558,800	2,000	< 0.1	< 0.1	
Paraguay	7,052,983	1,000	< 0.1	< 0.1	
Peru	31,237,385	< 1,000	< 0.1	< 0.1	
Philippines	109,000,000	5,450,000	5.0	0.3	
Poland	38,430,000	6,796	0.02	< 0.1	
Portugal	10,343,066	36,480	0.4	< 0.1	
Puerto Rico	3,337,177	1,000	< 0.1	< 0.1	
Qatar	2,450,285	1,566,786	77.5	0.1	
Congo	5,399,895	107,997	2.0	< 0.1	
Réunion	865,826	36,364	4.2	< 0.1	
Romania	19,524,000	73,000 – 200,000	0.3 – 1.0	< 0.1	
Russia	144,350,000 – 146,750,000	14,000,000 – 16,000,000	10.0 – 12.0	1.7 (Note: Including citizens of the Russian Federation, as well as immigrants and migrants who live in Russia)	
Rwanda	12,001,136	576,054	4.8	< 0.1	
Saint Helena	3,552	16	0.5	< 0.1	
Saint Kitts and Nevis	46,204	< 1,000	0.3	< 0.1	
Saint Lucia	171,834	292	0.2	< 0.1	
Saint Pierre and Miquelon	6,286	< 1,000	0.2	< 0.1	
Saint Vincent and the Grenadines	109,557	2,000	1.7	< 0.1	
Samoa	205,557	52	0.03	< 0.1	
San Marino	33,344	< 1,000	< 0.1	< 0.1	
São Tomé and Príncipe	199,910	5,931	3.0	< 0.1	
Saudi Arabia	34,220,000	31,535,000	96.2	1.8	
Senegal	17,923,036	17,421,191	97.2	0.8	
Serbia	6,647,003	278,212	4.2	< 0.1	
Seychelles	94,205	1,036	1.1	< 0.1	
Sierra Leone	7,719,729	6,067,706	78.6	0.3	
Singapore	5,866,139	915,118	15.6	< 0.1	
Slovakia	5,443,120	10,866	0.1 – 0.2	< 0.1	
Slovenia	2,066,880	73,568	3.6	< 0.1	
Solomon Islands	720,956	1,100	0.1	< 0.1	
Somalia	11,000,000	10,978,000	99.8	0.6	
South Africa	57,725,600	1,050,000	1.9	< 0.1	
South Korea	51,635,256	75,000	0.1	< 0.1	
South Sudan	12,323,419	2,464,683	20.0	< 0.1	
Spain	49,687,120	2,484,356	5.0	0.1	
Sri Lanka	21,700,000	2,105,000	9.7	0.1	
Sudan	40,825,770	38,585,777	96.0	1.9	
Suriname	600,000	85,800	14.3	< 0.1	
Sweden	10,182,291	700,000	7.1	< 0.1	
Switzerland	8,492,956	440,000	5.9	< 0.1	
Syria	18,000,000	15,000,000	87.0	1.0	
Taiwan	23,576,705	60,000	0.3	< 0.1	
Tajikistan	9,540,000	9,253,000	97.9	0.4	
Tanzania	54,199,163	19,426,814	35.2	0.8	
Thailand	67,726,419	3,639,232	5.4	0.2	
Timor-Leste	1,341,737	3,202 – >48,709	<0.5 – 3.6	< 0.1	
Togo	7,352,000	1,593,011	20.0	0.1	
Tokelau	1,499	<10	< 0.1	< 0.1	
Tonga	100,179	60	< 0.1	< 0.1	
Trinidad and Tobago	1,322,546	65,705	5.0	< 0.1	
Tunisia	11,446,300	10,190,000	97.8	0.6	
Turkey	86,000,000	78,000,000 – 84,400,000	91.0 – 98.0	4.6	
Turkmenistan	6,031,187	5,610,000	93.7	0.3	
Turks and Caicos Islands	37,910	< 1,000	< 0.1	< 0.1	
Tuvalu	10,640	< 1,000	0.1	< 0.1	
Uganda	38,823,100	5,435,234	14.0	0.3	
Ukraine	42,263,873	390,000 – 410,000	0.9 – 1.2	< 0.1	
United Arab Emirates	9,541,615	6,251,627	72.0	0.2	
United Kingdom	66,040,229	3,998,875	6.0	0.2	
United States	327,827,000	3,450,000	1.1	0.2	
U.S. Virgin Islands	104,914	< 1,000	0.1	< 0.1	
Uruguay	3,505,985	700- 1,500	0.1	< 0.1	
Uzbekistan	34,036,800	29,920,000	88.7	1.7	
Vanuatu	304,500	< 1,000	< 0.1	< 0.1	
Vatican City	800	0	0	0	
Venezuela	31,304,016	125,216	0.4	< 0.1	
Vietnam	100,000,000	70,000	0.07	< 0.1	
Wallis and Futuna	15,714	0	0	0	
Western Sahara	603,253	599,633	99.4	< 0.1	
Yemen	27,036,829	26,784,498	97.2	1.5	
Zambia	16,887,720	168,877	1.0	< 0.1	
Zimbabwe	14,000,000	100,000	0.7	< 0.1	

== Continents ==
=== Table ===
Region	Muslims	Muslim percentage (%) of total population	Percentage (%) of World Muslim population
Asia	1,100,000,000	23.3	66.7
Central Asia	54,000,000	81.0	3.0
South Asia	600,000,000	31.4	30.6
Southeast Asia	240,000,000	40.0	13.3
East Asia	50,000,000	3.1	2.8
West Asia and North Africa	315,322,000 – 488,603,838	91.2	27.1
Africa	550,000,000	47.0	30.6
Sub-Saharan Africa	283,302,393	29.6	15.7
North America	3,500,000 – 7,000,000	1.0	0.4
South America	791,000	0.2	0.04
Europe	44,138,000	6.0	2.7
Oceania	650,000	1.6	0.04
World	1,976,000,000	24.9	100.0

== Projected demographic changes ==
The Pew Research Center (PEW), has established a continued trend since its 2017 report into 2022. Islam continues to close the gap between itself and Christianity, while constituting the world's second largest religious group it also continues to be the fastest-growing major religious grouping.

A Pew Research Center (PEW) study in 2015 found that the Muslim population was expected to grow twice as fast (70%) as the world population by 2060 (1.8 billion in 2015 to 3 billion by 2060). This expected growth is much larger than any other religious group. Muslims are likely to constitute roughly 26.3% of the world's total population by 2030. This expected growth is attributed to Muslim families generally having more children as well as the fact that the Muslim population has the youngest median age of any religion. Furthermore, increased healthcare conditions in Muslim majority countries are currently increasing life expectancy and decreasing child mortality, which, if trends continue this way, will also contribute to the growth of the Muslim population more than any other religious group. These trends are not for every region, however. In fact, Muslim population growth is expected to slow down in Asia (including the Middle East) and Africa, due to lower birth rates.

The largest Muslim population growths are expected to be in the Middle East and Africa. Furthermore, Pakistan is projected to be the country with the largest Muslim population by 2030. Muslims are expected to grow to 8% (52.8 million) of the total population of Europe, and this growth is expected to be the largest in the western European countries. Russia will have the largest total population of Muslims in Europe, however. Most of these changes are expected to come from immigration.

In the Americas, Canada’s Muslim population is expected to increase to 6.6% and United States' to 2% by 2030. These increases, much like Europe, are expected to be driven mainly by immigration.

== See also ==
=== Islam ===
- Muslim world
- Outline of Islam
- Glossary of Islam
- Muslim population growth
- Index of Islam-related articles
- Shia Muslims in the Arab world
- Organisation of Islamic Cooperation (OIC)

=== By country ===
- Ahmadiyya by country
- Apostasy in Islam by country
- Application of Sharia by country
- Burqa by country
- Islamic veiling practices by country

=== General links ===
- List of religious populations
- Religions by country
