= Islam in the Americas =

Muslim population of the Americas by country and divisions wise

Islam is a minority religion across the countries and territories of the Americas. Approximately 1% of the population of North America are Muslims, and 0.1% of the population of Latin America and the Caribbean are Muslims.

Suriname has the highest percentage of Muslims in its population for the region, with 13.9% or 75,053 individuals, according to its 2012 census. However, the United States, in which estimates vary due to a lack of a census question, is generally believed to have the largest population, with approximately 3.45 million Muslims living there, about 1.1 percent of the total U.S. population.

Most Muslims in the former British Caribbean came from the Indian subcontinent as indentured labourers following the abolition of slavery. This movement also reached Suriname, although other Muslims there moved from a separate Dutch colony, which is now Indonesia. In the United States, the largest Muslim ethnic group is of white Arabs from the Middle East. However, in South America, the Muslim population is mainly composed of upper-class immigrants from the Levant, including those from Lebanon and Syria.

== Population by country ==
The population of Muslims varies across the Americas. Below is the percentage of every American country that was Muslim in 2010, according to a Pew Research Center estimate:

Muslims among total population
Country	Estimated % (in 2010)
Suriname	15.2
Guyana	7.0(2012)
Trinidad and Tobago	5.9
Canada	4.9(2021)
(Saint Vincent and the Grenadines) St. Vincent and the Grenadines	1.5
British Virgin Islands	1.2
Bermuda	1.1
Argentina	2.14
Barbados	1.0
French Guiana	0.9
United States	1.34
Panama	0.7
Antigua and Barbuda	0.6
Cayman Islands	0.4
Guadeloupe	0.4
AnguillaAnguilla	0.3
Falkland Islands	0.3
Grenada	0.3
(Saint Kitts and Nevis) St. Kitts and Nevis	0.3
Venezuela	0.3
Aruba	0.2
(Netherlands Antilles) Caribbean Netherlands	0.2
Curaçao	0.2
Martinique	0.2
Sint Maarten	0.2
(Saint Pierre and Miquelon) St. Pierre and Miquelon	0.2
(The Bahamas) Bahamas	0.1
Belize	0.1
Dominica	0.1
Honduras	0.1
(Saint Lucia) St. Lucia	0.1
(United States Virgin Islands) U.S. Virgin Islands	0.1
Bolivia	<0.1
Brazil	<0.1
Chile	<0.1
Colombia	<0.1
Costa Rica	<0.1
Cuba	<0.1
Dominican Republic	<0.1
Ecuador	<0.1
El Salvador	<0.1
Greenland	<0.1
Haiti	<0.1
Jamaica	<0.1
Mexico	<0.1
Montserrat	<0.1
Paraguay	<0.1
Peru	<0.1
Puerto Rico	<0.1
Turks and Caicos Islands	<0.1
Uruguay	<0.1

== Immigrant Muslims in America ==
During the rule of the Spanish and Portuguese in the Americas, Islam and any religion beyond Catholic Christianity was strictly forbidden. Some of the first Muslims to enter America were Wolof (Jelofe) slaves of Senegal who were introduced to Hispaniola in 1522. Their entry was soon banned by Casa de Contratación that regulated Spanish trade in the Americas since they were considered Moors (Moros). This did however not stop their further import since African slaves who were introduced to Spanish America had their origin and faith obscured by slave traders. Despite the suppression of Islam some Islamic customs and beliefs appear to have transferred to the Americas such as the idea of going to heaven riding horses and bathing on Saint John's Eve.

In regards to Immigrant Muslims in America: at first, a population of African Muslims entered the United States as slaves, and at the next stage, while the immigration laws to this country eased the conditions for accepting immigrants from all over the world, another population of Muslim people entered there. In the last 25 years, new waves of immigrants as well as the tendency of a large group of American blacks to Islam have caused an increase in the number of Muslims in America. According to one of the professors of the University of Massachusetts, USA, the number of Muslims in America is estimated to be close to four million people, and is appraised that two thirds of this population are "immigrants and their children" apart from Muslim Americans.

In 1991, more than 100,000 immigrants entered the United States legally, most of whom were people (mostly Muslim) from Bangladesh, Pakistan, Iran, Lebanon, Egypt and India.

== Islamic worship traditions ==
=== Shias in the Americas ===
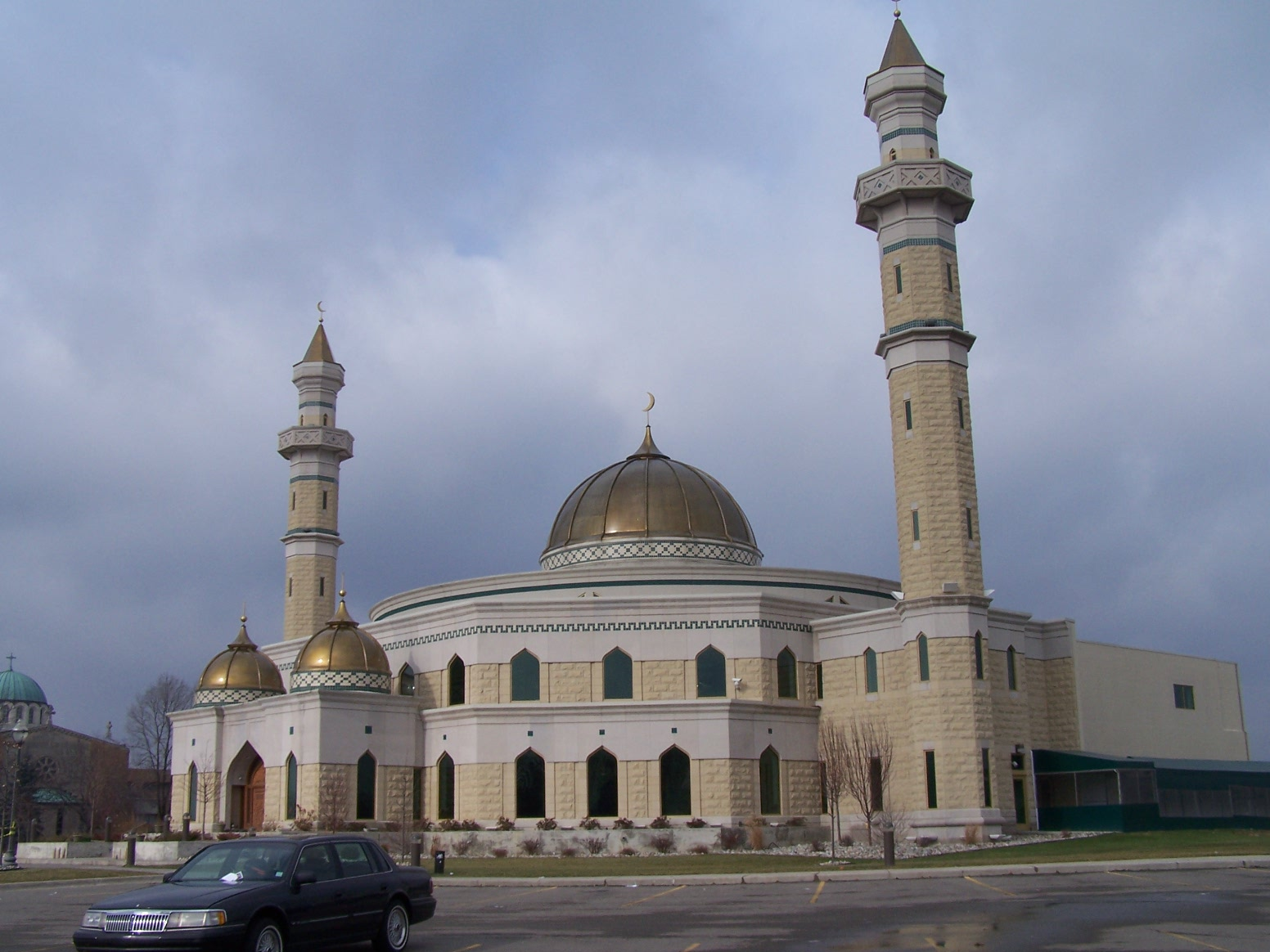
The Islamic Center of America, the largest mosque in the USA, located in Michigan

Shia Muslims comprise 15-20% of Muslims in the Americas; which is nearly 786,000 to 2.500.000 persons in the U.S. Shia Muslims are situated on United States. The American Shia Muslim community are from different parts of the world such as South Asia, Europe, Middle East, and East Africa.

The American Shia Muslim community have many activities and have founded several organization such as the Islamic Center of America and North America Shia Ithna-Asheri Muslim Communities Organization (NASIMCO).

The first group of immigrant Shiites (Shias) migrated to the United States from Lebanon and Syria about one hundred and eighty years ago (1824-1878). These Shiite Muslims migrated to cities such as Detroit, Michigan, and Ross (California) and North Dakota.

== See also ==
- Islam in Asia
- Islam in Europe
- Islam in Oceania
- Lists of mosques in North America
- Lists of mosques in South America
- Organisation of Islamic Cooperation
