= Islam in Oceania =

Oceania and South East Asia Muslim Population Map

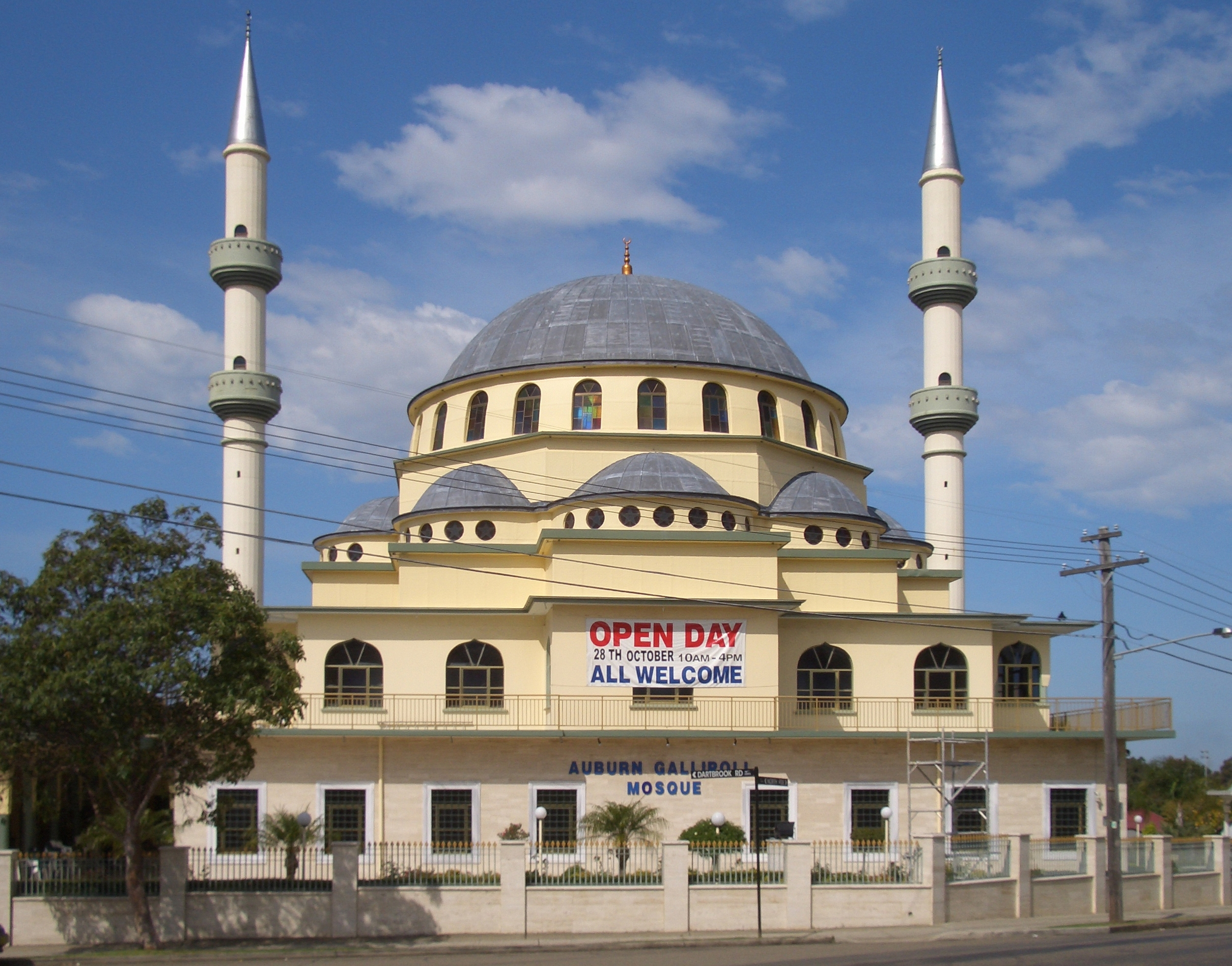
Gallipoli mosque, Auburn, Sydney.

The Islamic religion is followed by a relatively small proportion of the population of Oceania. By 2010 estimates, there were 620,156 Muslims in Oceania as a whole: 476,600 in Australia, 48,151 in New Zealand, 52,520 in Fiji, 6,352 in New Caledonia, 2,200 in Papua New Guinea, 360 in Solomon Islands, 221 in Vanuatu, 110 in Tonga.

According to a 2007 article in Pacific Magazine, entitled 'Green Moon Rising', Islam has seen a substantial increase in adherents amongst the peoples of Vanuatu, Fiji, Solomon Islands, Papua New Guinea and New Caledonia. There have been thousands of indigenous converts to Islam in Melanesia.

== History ==
Islam has been documented in some parts of Oceania possibly as early as the 16th century due to contacts with the largely Muslim peoples of Indonesia. When the people of New Guinea traded with China and the kingdoms of Southeast Asia, from at least the 16th century, the presence of Islam was felt in Oceania for the first time.

Some regions, including Western New Guinea, have long-established native Muslim populations. Islam first gained a presence in the region via Moluccan influence in the 17th century although Muslim merchants had conducted trade with the western Papuans from the 15th century or earlier.

Other parts of Oceania did not feel the presence of Islam until the 19th century. For example, the first Muslims in Fiji came when Muslim migrants came on a ship bringing indentured labourers to Fiji in 1879. Muslims consisted of 22% of the boarders on Leonidas, which was the first such ship.

There are also approximately 500 Muslims in Palau, whose government allowed a few Uyghurs detained in Guantanamo Bay to settle in the island nation.

== Demographics ==
Australasia
Country	Total Population	Muslim	
Country	Total Population	Population	(%)
Australia	25,890,773	813,392	3.20
New Zealand	4,993,923	75,144	1.50

Melanesia
Country	Population	Muslim	
Country	Population	Pop.	%
Fiji	918,465	~60,000	6.53
New Caledonia	290,000	8,521	2.94
Papua New Guinea	7,613,295	10,000	0.13
Solomon Islands	734,887	1,100	0.15
Vanuatu	300,000	~1000	0.33

* Cocos (Keeling) Islands: 65.6% Muslim (2021).

== See also ==
- Islam by country
- List of mosques in Oceania
- Algerians of the Pacific
- Afghan (Australia)
- Māori Muslims
- Islam Day (Hawaii)
