= Islam in Western Sahara =

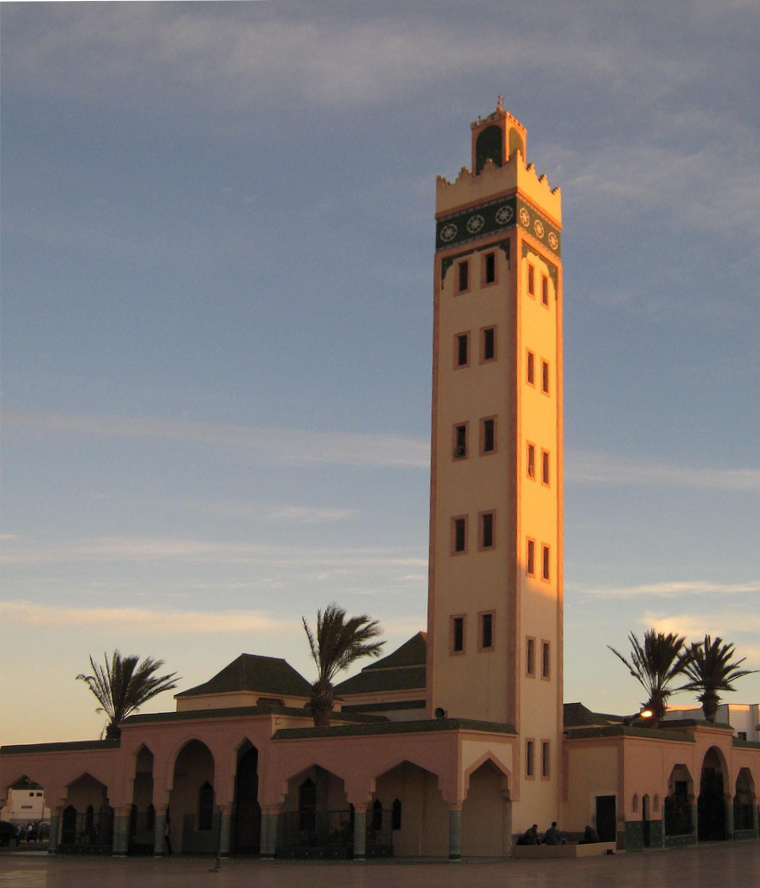
A mosque in Dakhla

According to the CIA World Factbook, Muslims make up almost 100 percent of the population of the Western Sahara.

== Prominent Sahrawi Muslims ==
Adnan Abu Walid al-Sahrawi (1973–2021), a Sahrawi Islamist militant, was one of the founders of the Movement for Oneness and Jihad in West Africa (MUJAO), and the first Emir of the Islamic State – Sahel Province.

== See also ==
- Islam by country
