= Islam in Asia =

Choropleth map showing the Muslim share of population across Asia, c. 2020.

Islam in Asia began in the 7th century during the lifetime of Muhammad. In 2020, the total number of Muslims in Asia was about 1.3 billion, making it the largest religion in Asia. Asia constitutes in absolute terms the world's largest Muslim population, and about 62% of the world's Muslims live in Asia, while Indonesia having the most Muslims of the world in a country, and several others with Pakistan, India, Bangladesh and Malaysia having large Muslim populations in the world. Asia is home to the largest Muslim population, with West Asia, Central Asia, South Asia, and Southeast Asia being particularly important regions. A number of adherents of Islam have lived in Asia especially in West Asia and South Asia since the beginning of Islamic history.

== History ==
The spread of Islam outside of the Arabian Peninsula and into other parts of the continent can be linked to the extensive trade routes connecting West Asia to China.

The Barmakid family was an early supporter of the Abbasid Revolution against the Umayyads and of As-Saffah. This gave Khalid ibn Barmak considerable influence, and his son Yaḥyā ibn Khālid (d. 806) was the vizier of the caliph al-Mahdi (ruled 775–785) and tutor of Hārūn ar-Rashīd (ruled 786–809). Yaḥyā's sons al-Faḍl and Ja'far (767–803) both occupied high offices under Harun. Many Barmakids were patrons of the sciences, which greatly helped the propagation of Indian science and scholarship from the neighboring Academy of Gundishapur into the Arabic world. They patronized scholars such as Gebir and Jabril ibn Bukhtishu. They are also credited with the establishment of the first paper mill in Baghdad. The power of the Barmakids in those times is reflected in The Book of One Thousand and One Nights; the vizier Ja'far appears in several stories, as well as a tale that gave rise to the expression “Barmecide feast”.

We know of Yaḥyā ibn Khālid al-Barmakī (d. 805 CE) as a patron of physicians and, specifically, of the translation of Hindu medical works into both Arabic and Persian. In all likelihood, however, his activity took place in the orbit of the caliphal court in Iraq, where at the behest of Hārūn ar-Rashīd (786–809), such books were translated into Arabic. Thus Khurāsān and Transoxiana were effectively bypassed in this transfer of learning from India to Islam, even though, undeniably the Barmakī's cultural outlook owed something to their land of origin, northern Afghanistan, and Yaḥyā al-Barmakī's interest in medicine may have derived from no longer identifiable family tradition.

Many of the early governors of the Caliphate were Barmakids. Khalid ibn Barmak built Mansura, Sindh and later Baghdad. His son was the governor of what is now Azerbaijan.

== Demographics ==
=== Central Asia ===
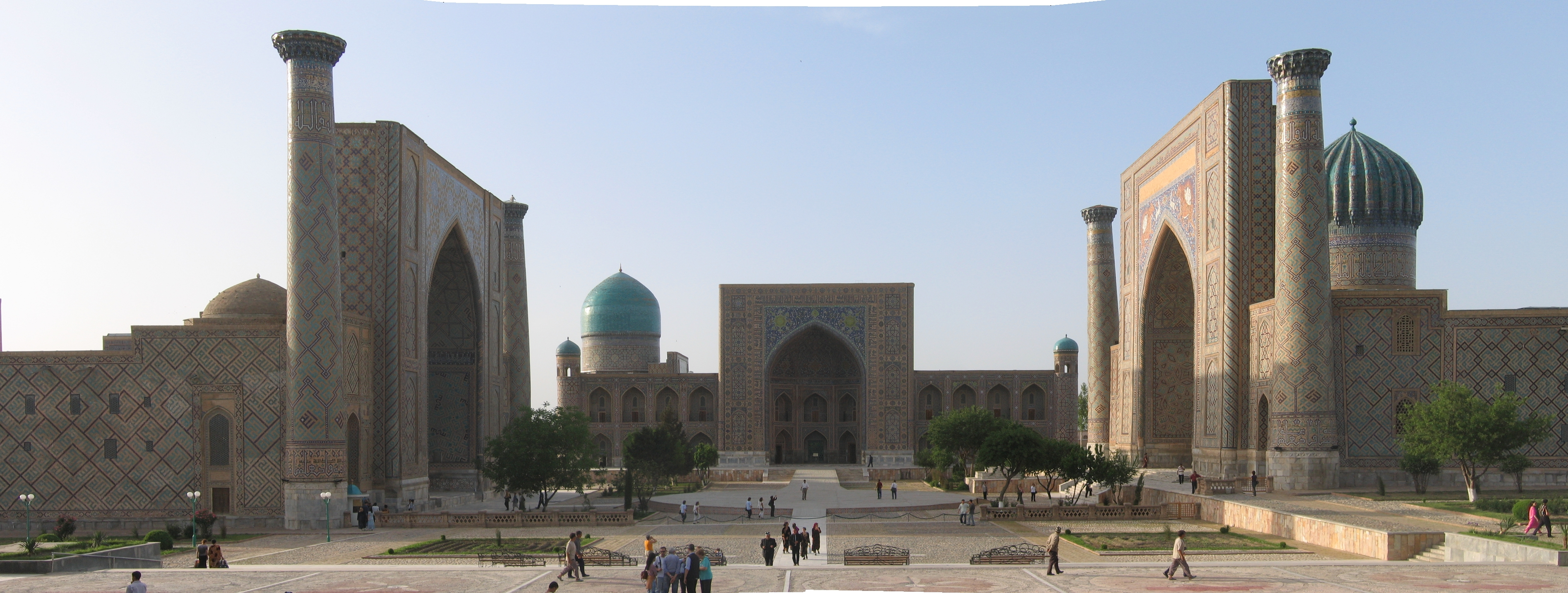
The Registan and its three madrasahs, Samarkand, Uzbekistan

Country	Total Population	Muslim Percentage	Muslim Population
Kazakhstan	18,744,548	70.2%	13,158,672
Kyrgyzstan	6,019,480	90.6%	5,194,811
Tajikistan	8,734,951	98.0%	8,560,251
Turkmenistan	5,851,466	96.1%	5,459,417
Uzbekistan	32,653,900	96.5%	31,511,013
Central Asia	72,004,345	90.6%	66,884,164

=== East Asia ===
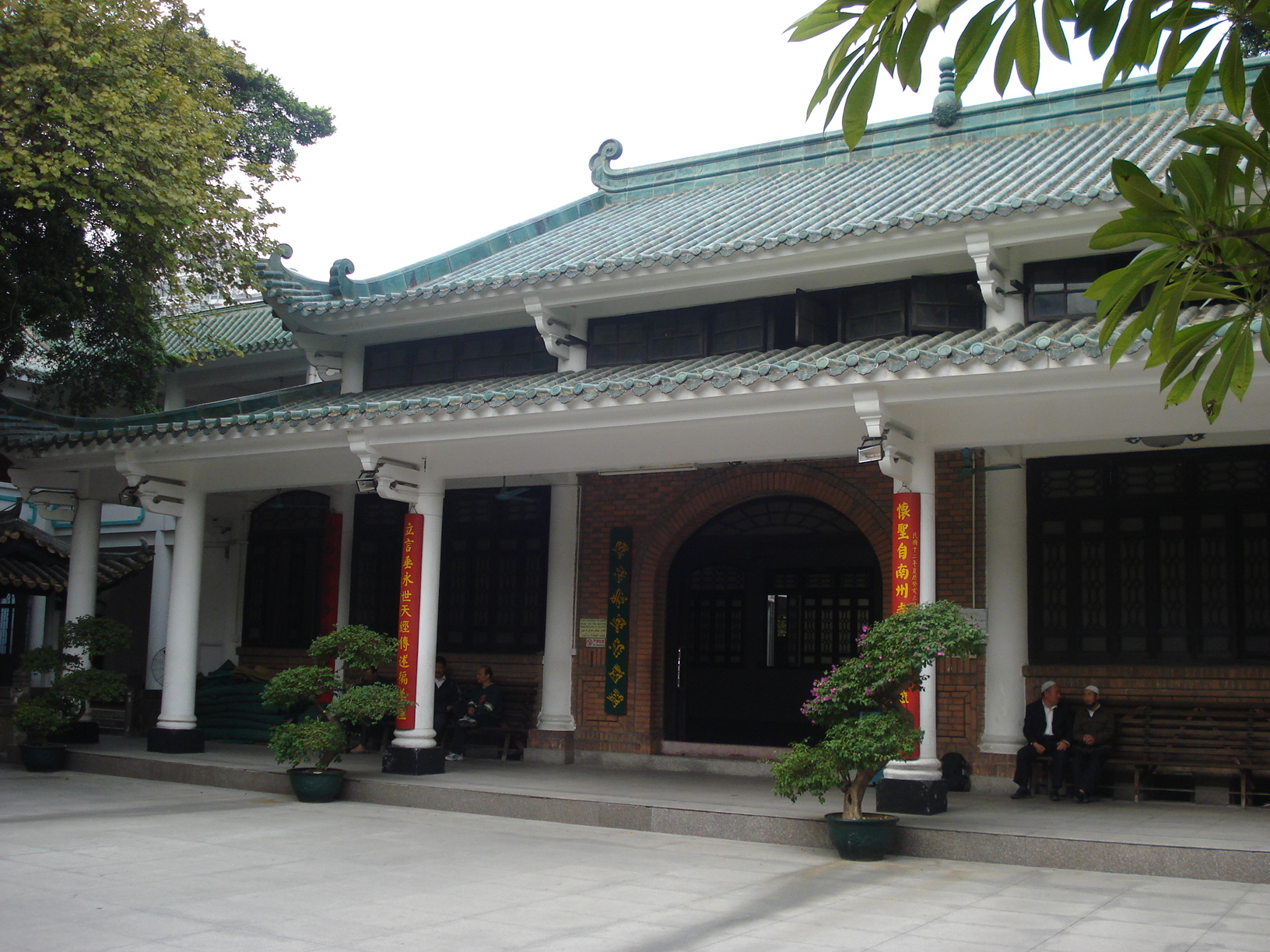
Huaisheng Mosque in Guangzhou, the oldest mosque in China

Country	Total Population	Muslim Percentage	Muslim Population
China	1,447,620,350	1.8%	26,057,166
Hong Kong	7,450,000	4.2%	320,000
Macau	660,000	1.5%	10,000
Japan	126,420,000	0.19%	230,000
North Korea	25,610,672	0.02%	5,000
South Korea	51,635,256	0.38%	196,454
Mongolia	3,231,200	5.0%	121,560
Taiwan	23,577,488	0.3%	70,732
East Asia	1,633,202,416	3.13%	26,889,352

=== South Asia ===
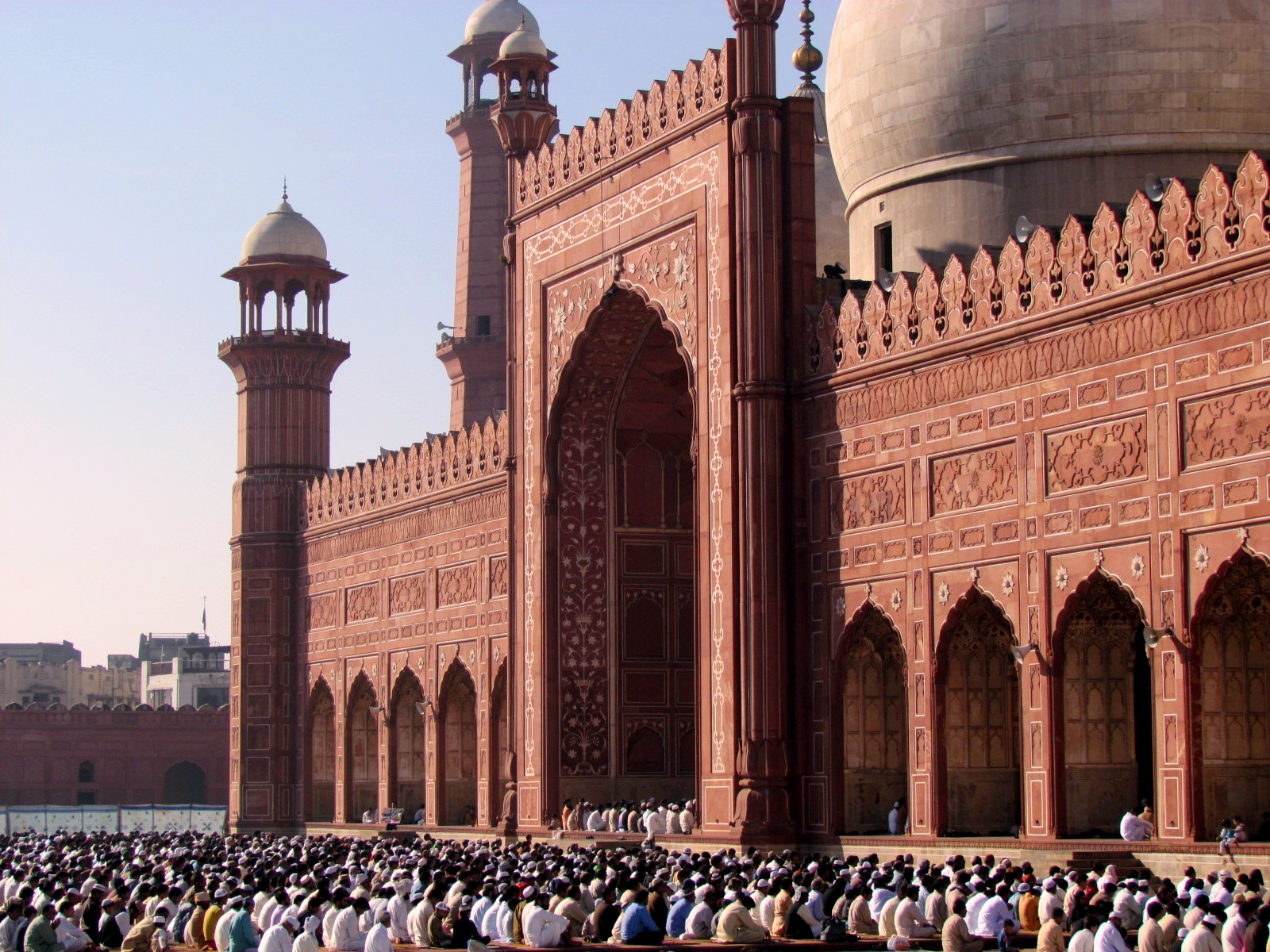
The Badshahi Mosque in Lahore, Pakistan during Eid al-Fitr. It is a historical and the second largest mosque in South Asia

Country	Total Population	Muslim Percentage	Muslim Population
Afghanistan	49,552,566	99.7%	49,403,908
Bangladesh	165,000,000	90.4%	149,100,000
Bhutan	727,145	0.2%	7,000
India	1,338,270,000	15.6%	213,000,000
Maldives	378,114	100%	378,114
Nepal	29,218,867	4.4%	1,285,630
Pakistan	231,085,590	96.50%	200,400,000
Sri Lanka	21,444,000	9.7%	2,080,068
South Asia	1,817,333,303	32.43%	620,083,325

=== Southeast Asia ===
The Istiqlal Mosque in Jakarta, the largest mosque in Southeast Asia

Country	Total Population	Muslim Percentage	Muslim Population
Brunei	460,345	82.7%	380,705
Cambodia	16,204,486	2%	312,540
East Timor	1,291,358	0.3%	4,000
Indonesia	266,500,000	86.7%	231,070,000
Laos	7,126,706	0.1%	8,000
Malaysia	32,730,000	63.5%	20,623,140
Myanmar	55,123,814	4.15%	2,300,000
Philippines	112,018,293	6.4%	6,981,710
Singapore	5,888,926	15.6%	918,672
Thailand	68,414,135	5.0%	3,420,706
Vietnam	96,160,163	0.1%	196,000
Southeast Asia	679,726,700	40.8%	277,346,378

=== West Asia ===
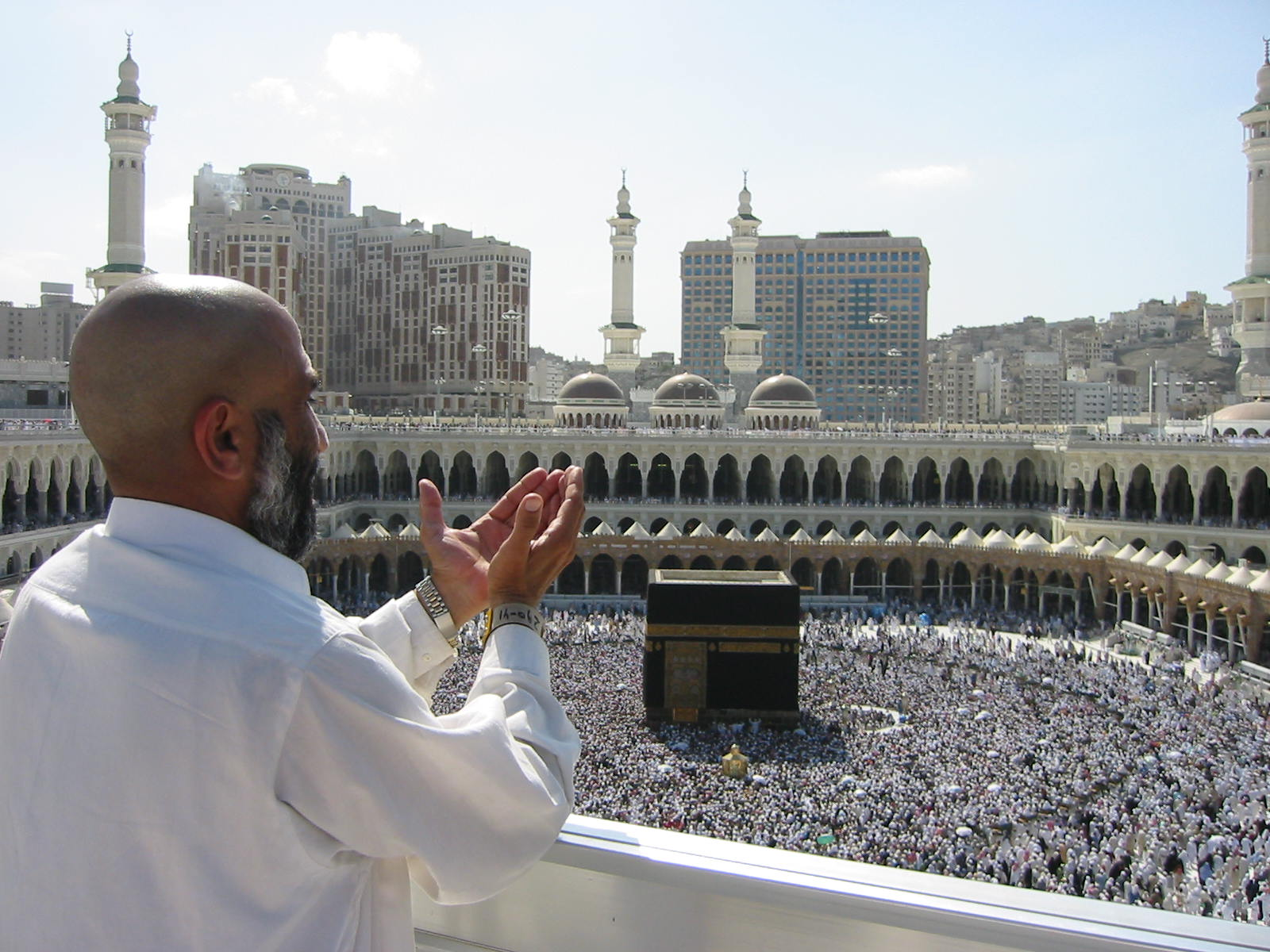
Kaaba Inside the Masjid al-Haram in Mecca, Saudi Arabia with pilgrims performing the Hajj, Kaaba is the direction of prayer of Muslims to Allah

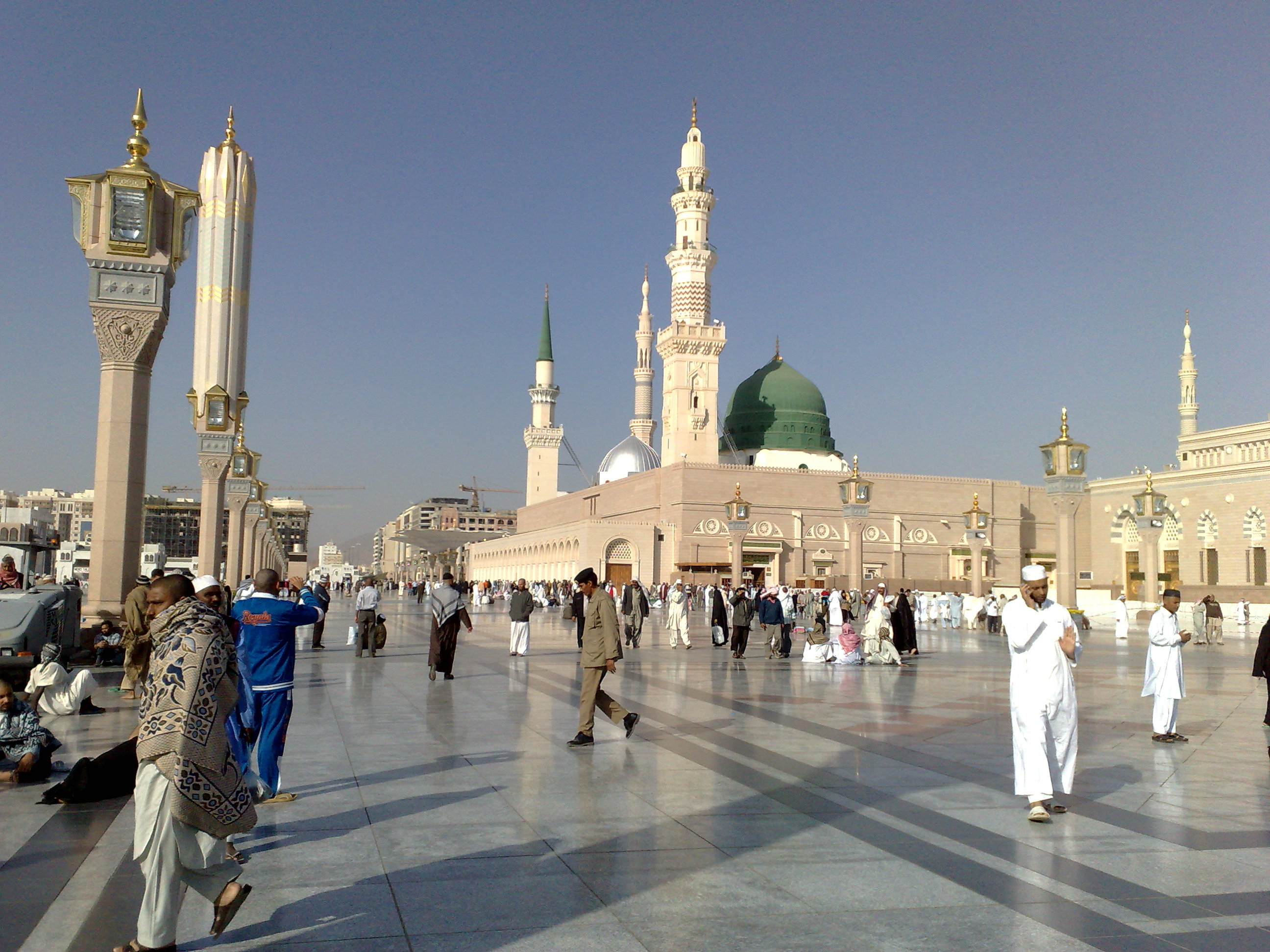
An-Nabawi Mosque, Medina

Country	Total Population	Muslim Percentage	Muslim Population
Armenia	2,975,000	0.03%	1,000
Azerbaijan	10,027,874	96.9%	9,727,038
Bahrain	1,496,300	81.2%	1,214,995
Cyprus	854,800	25.4%	217,119
Georgia	3,723,464	10.7%	463,062
Iran	81,871,500	99%	81,052,785
Iraq	39,339,753	98.0%	38,552,957
Israel	8,930,680	17.7%	1,580,730
Jordan	10,261,300	94.0%	9,645,622
Kuwait	4,226,920	85.0%	3,592,882
Lebanon	6,093,509	54.0%	3,200,000
Oman	4,651,706	99.0%	4,605,188
Palestine	4,816,503	93.0%,	4,479,347
Qatar	2,561,643	77.5%	1,985,273
Saudi Arabia	33,413,660	100.0%	33,413,660
Syria	18,284,407	87.0%	15,907,434
Turkey	80,810,525	99.8%	80,648,903
United Arab Emirates	9,582,340	80.0%	7,665,872
Yemen	28,915,284	99.1%	28,915,284
West Asia	352,837,168	79.45%	326,869,151
