= Muhammad Mosque (Bermuda) =

Mosque in Hamilton, Bermuda

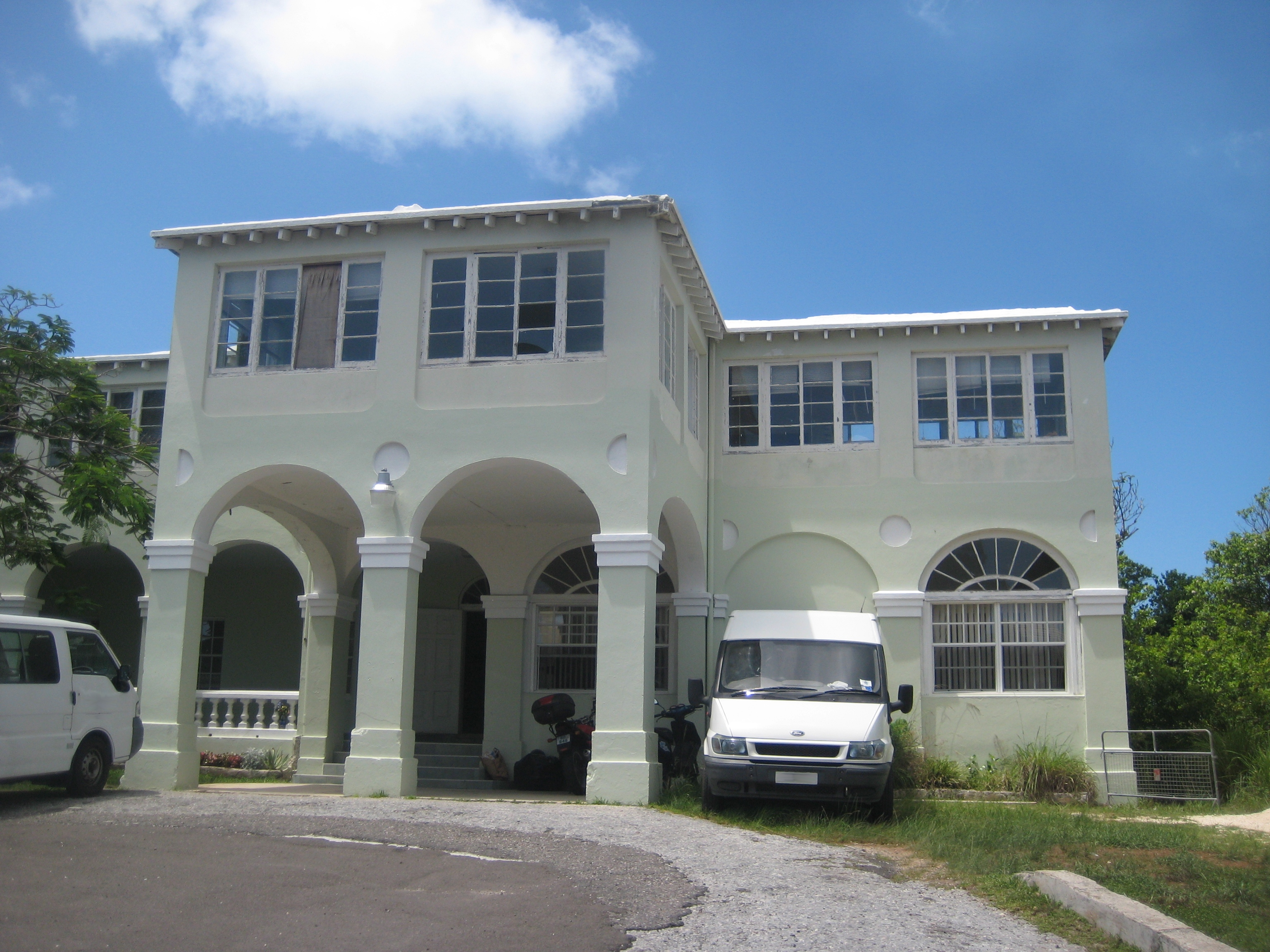

- Bermuda

Religion
- Affiliation: Sunni Islam

Location
- Location: No. 32 Cedar Avenue, Hamilton, Bermuda
- Country: United Kingdom
- Interactive map of Muhammad Mosque
- Coordinates: 32°17′52″N 64°47′06″W

Architecture
- Type: mosque
- Established: 1975

Specifications
- Interior area: 669 m^{2} (7,200 sq ft)
- Site area: 3,772 m^{2} (40,600 sq ft)

Website
- masjidmuhammad.net

The Muhammad Mosque is a mosque in Hamilton, Bermuda. The mosque was established in 1975.

== Architecture ==
The mosque occupies a four-story building comprising a main prayer hall, school, imam's office, and a community center. The total floor area of the building is 669 square metres (7,200 sq ft) on a land area of 3,772 square metres (40,600 sq ft).

== See also ==
- Islam in Bermuda
- List of mosques in the United Kingdom
