= Islam in Bolivia =

Statistics for Islam in Bolivia estimate a Muslim population of around 3,000, representing 0.02% out of the total population of 11,220,000 inhabitants.

In 2004 the first official Sunni mosque, the Yebel An Nur Mosque, was founded in 2004 in La Paz. The Yebel An Nur Mosque remains self-funded with close ties to the Sunni Bolivian Islamic Center of Santa Cruz while the As-Salam Mosque receives both Sunni and Shia followers, connections, and funding.

== See also ==
- Latin American Muslims
- Latino Muslims
- Islam by country
