= La Paz As-Salam Mosque =

Sunni Islamic mosque in La Paz, Bolivia

As-Salam Mosque
- مسجد السلام

Religion
- Affiliation: Sunni Islam
- Ecclesiastical or organizational status: Mosque
- Ownership: Islamic Association Community Yebel An Nur
- Status: Active

Location
- Location: Guachalla 725, La Paz
- Country: Bolivia

Architecture
- Type: Mosque
- Completed: 2006

As-Salam Mosque (Arabic: مسجد السلام, lit. 'Mosque of Peace'; Spanish: Mezquita As-Salam) is a Sunni mosque located in La Paz, the administrative capital of Bolivia.

== Overview ==
The mosque was established in 2006 by local Muslim converts and immigrants from the Middle East and South Asia.

The mosque's recognition by Bolivian authorities signaled greater religious freedom and visibility for Muslims in the country.

== See also ==
- Islam in Bolivia
- List of mosques in South America
