= Islam in the Northern Mariana Islands =

Islam in the Northern Mariana Islands (Arabic:الإسلام في جزر ماريانا الشمالية) is a minority religion. According to a 2009 report by the Pew Research Center, the Northern Mariana Islands, a commonwealth of the United States (a non-incorporated territory freely associated with the United States), are home to 1,000 Muslims, making up about 0.7–1% of the island's population.

== Mosque ==
There are only two mosques in the country:

- Saipan Baitus Salam jam-e Masjid located on the islands of Saipan, the capital of the country (Saipan has a large immigrant population from China, Bangladesh, Philippines, Thailand, Vietnam, and Cambodia)
- Tinian mosque located in Tinian (Tinian also has immigrants from the Philippines, Bangladesh, and East Asia).

== See also ==
- Islam in the United States
