= Islam in the Netherlands Antilles =

Islam is a minority religion in the Netherlands Antilles. There are about 2,500 Muslims in the Islands, 1000 of which are in the Caribbean Netherlands, or 0.31% of the population. Most Muslims are emigrants from Lebanon, Syria and Suriname.

== History ==
Muslims began to reach the islands during colonial times as workers (mainly as slaves and indentured labourers, from Sub-Saharan African countries then from the British India (Indian subcontinent). Then there was a wave of Muslims coming from Lebanon, Syria and Iraq as well as some indigenous people who converted to Islam. In 1982 there were about 2000 Muslims.

== Islamic centers ==
The majority of the Islam community is located on Curaçao where is the only mosque: Omar bin Al-Khattab Mosque, with its imam, Sheikh Yakubu Mohammed. There are other Islamic centers, including:

- Bonaire Islamic Center, Kaya Hanchi Amboina, Bonaire
- Curaçao Islamic Center, Weg Naar Welgelegen # 6, Island of Curaçao, Willemstad
- Sint Maarten Islamic Center, Puma Road 26, Philipsburg
- Muslim Gemeente Curaçao, Weg Naar Welgelegen 6, Curaçao, Willemstad
- Muslim Student Association, University Of Sint Eustatius School Of Medicine, Oranjestad, ST EUSTATIUS
- Sint Eustatius Islamic Foundation, Oranjestad, Sint Eustatius

== See also ==
- Islam in the Netherlands
- Islam in Aruba
