= Islam in Ecuador =

Islam is a minority religion in Ecuador. The Pew Research Center estimates that Ecuador has a Muslim population of about 2,000, representing 0.0117% out of the total population of 16,965,000 inhabitants.

== History ==
The first Muslim settlers in Ecuador were primarily Arabs who emigrated from the Middle East during World War I and thereafter from former territories of the Ottoman Empire. They settled mostly in Quito, Ambato and Guayaquil with smaller communities in Manabí, Los Ríos, and Esmeraldas provinces. Levantine Christians and Muslims created a secular ethnic organization called Lecla in the 1940s and The Arab Club in the 1980s. By the mid-1990s, naturalized citizens and native Muslims of Arab extraction were using a private apartment located in Avenue Los Shyris and Eloy Alfaro as a communal prayer venue, especially on Fridays. At a later day, the Egyptian Embassy provided another private apartment for the same purposes. The Centro Islámico del Ecuador, founded on October 15, 1994, was the first Muslim religious organization recognized by the government. However, it was not the first organization to open its doors in this city. A mosque under the name Khalid ibn al-Walid was founded in the year 1991; it conducted its religious rituals in a private apartment. Religious activities as well as social, cultural, and educational activities are conducted according to Sunni Islam. The Khaled ibn al Walid mosque nowadays is run by Sheikh Mohamed Mamdouh and had opened its doors to all Muslims domiciled in Quito. Recently, Spier (2022) presented a study outlining the manifestations of Islamophobia in Quito, Ecuador.

In Guayaquil, the Centro Islamico Al Hijra was established in 2004 by Juan Saud from Ecuador, Ali Said from Pakistan, and Mazhar Farooq from India.

== Organizations ==
- In the 1940s, Christians and Muslims of the Levant founded a secular ethnic organization called Lukla, which was renamed the Arab Club in the 1980s.
- The Islamic Center of Ecuador (Centro Islâmico del Ecuador), founded on October 15, 1994, was the first Muslim religious organization recognized by the government. The organization is headed by former military officer Juan 'Yahya' Suquillo.
- The Islamic Community of Ecuador (Comunidad Islamica del Ecuador) or Al-Salam Mosque was founded in the country's capital Quito.
- In 2004, the Centro Islamico Al Hijra was founded in Guayaquil by Juan Said from Ecuador, Ali Said from Pakistan, and Mazhar Farooq from India. The Al-Hijra Islamic Center is recognized by the state, has 85 regular Muslims, and headed by Juan 'Abdullah' Saud, an Ecuadorian who convert to Islam.

== Notable figures ==
- Dr. Yahya Suquillo – Dr. Suquillo was born and raised in Quito, Ecuador. He received a master's degree in Islamic Sciences from the University of Madinah in Saudi Arabia. He is the founder and religious director of El Centro Islámico de Quito. He is also the General Secretary for the Interfaith Council CONALIR fighting for religious rights and anti-discrimination. His books in Spanish have been popular and Suquillo is regarded as a bridge and reference for Latino Muslim leaders and scholars. Dr. Suquillo is listed as one of the top 500 Most Influential Muslims in the World.
- Susy Sacoto – Miss Ecuador 2021 who converted to islam in 2022.

== See also ==
- Religion in Ecuador
- Latin American Muslims
- Latino Muslims
