= Islam in Dominica =

Islamin Dominica (الإسلام في دومينيكا) is a minority religion. Statistics on the number of Muslims in Dominica are not available. The Muslim Community of Dominica estimates that there are 300 Muslims in Dominica.

== History ==
Muslims initially came to Dominica on slave ships from European countries. Starting in the 1500s, a significant proportion of the slaves brought to what is now Dominica were taken from Muslim regions of West Africa (Senegal, Mali, Guinea, Ivory Coast). Slaves were not allowed freedom of religion. As a result, Islam was not preserved for the African population of Dominica during the later generations of Caribbean people.

It was not until the 1960s that Islam began to spread to the Afro-Caribbean population of the Caribbean countries. Dominican students studying at the University of the West Indies in the United States and Trinidad converted to Islam. They later became prominent leaders of the Dominican Muslim community. In the 1970s, many Islamic leaders were forced to leave Dominica.

Dominica was not a hospitable place for Muslims until the 1980s. Many people viewed Muslims as they viewed Rastafari and treated them with disdain. During the administration of Prime Minister Eugenia Charles (1980–1995), some Muslims arriving in Dominica by plane were denied entry and forced to leave on the next flight.

The Muslim Community of Dominica was officially registered in 1995 and remains the only registered Muslim organization in the country. There are an estimated 300 Muslims in Dominica. Muslims can now be found in all levels of Dominican society, including teachers, doctors, lawyers, and workers.

== Distribution ==
The Constitution of Dominica provides for freedom of religion, which is respected by the government and society at large. The most widely practiced religion in Dominica is Christianity, with a majority of adherents being Catholics, as well as Protestants (Baptists, etc.). The island also has a diverse religious minority community. According to the 2005 International Religious Freedom Report, 2.1% of the country's population (74,000 people, 2017) are adherents of religious minority denominations: Rastafari, Jehovah's Witnesses, Anglican Church, Islam, Buddhism, etc.). 0.1% of the total population are Muslims (approximately 70-100 people).

== Islamic organizations ==
- In Roseau: Dominica Muslim Community in Roseau
- In Portsmouth: Association of Muslim Students at Ross University Medical School in Portsmouth.

== Mosques ==
External image
- Photos of mosques in Dominica.

In 2004, a Muslim community of approximately 150 international (mostly Canadian, American, etc.) students from the Ross University School of Medicine and their families moved to the country's capital, Portsmouth, which was its capital until 1978. In Portsmouth, Ross financed the construction of the country's first mosque, the modest Al-Ansaar Masjid, located 200 meters from the seafront, next to the University of Portsmouth.

The country's capital, Roseau, opened its first mosque, the Islamic Community Center (Roseau Masjid / Community Center). For 40 years, Roseau has housed private homes, offices, rented apartments, and classrooms. The Roseau Masjid, a community center, operates as a regular mosque, and in addition to the five daily prayers, the mosque serves as a coordination center (organization, leadership, classes, etc.) and continues to play a key role in the life of the local Muslim community. Another important function of the mosque is to support and promote religious education. The mosque is governed by an elected five-member council.

The largest Muslim community in Dominica is in the Kalinago Territory, consisting of 60 Muslim Caribs born in Kalinago who converted to Islam. The community has a small mosque (Kalinago Territory Masjid) overlooking the Atlantic Ocean, built by one of the first Muslim Caribs, now deceased. In the past, Kalinago Muslims were awarded scholarships to study at Islamic institutions in nearby Guyana and Trinidad.
