= Islam in Bermuda =

According to a 2009 Pew Research Center report, there are 1,000 Muslims who constitute approximately 0.8% of the population in Bermuda.

== Demography ==
Most Muslims are of Afro-Bermudian origin and of convert background. Most Muslims live and congregate in Hamilton, where Bermuda's main Islamic centers are located.

== Mosques ==
- Muhammad Mosque
- Masjid Quba, in Southampton

== See also ==
- Islam in the United States
- Religion in Bermuda
