= Islam in Antigua and Barbuda =

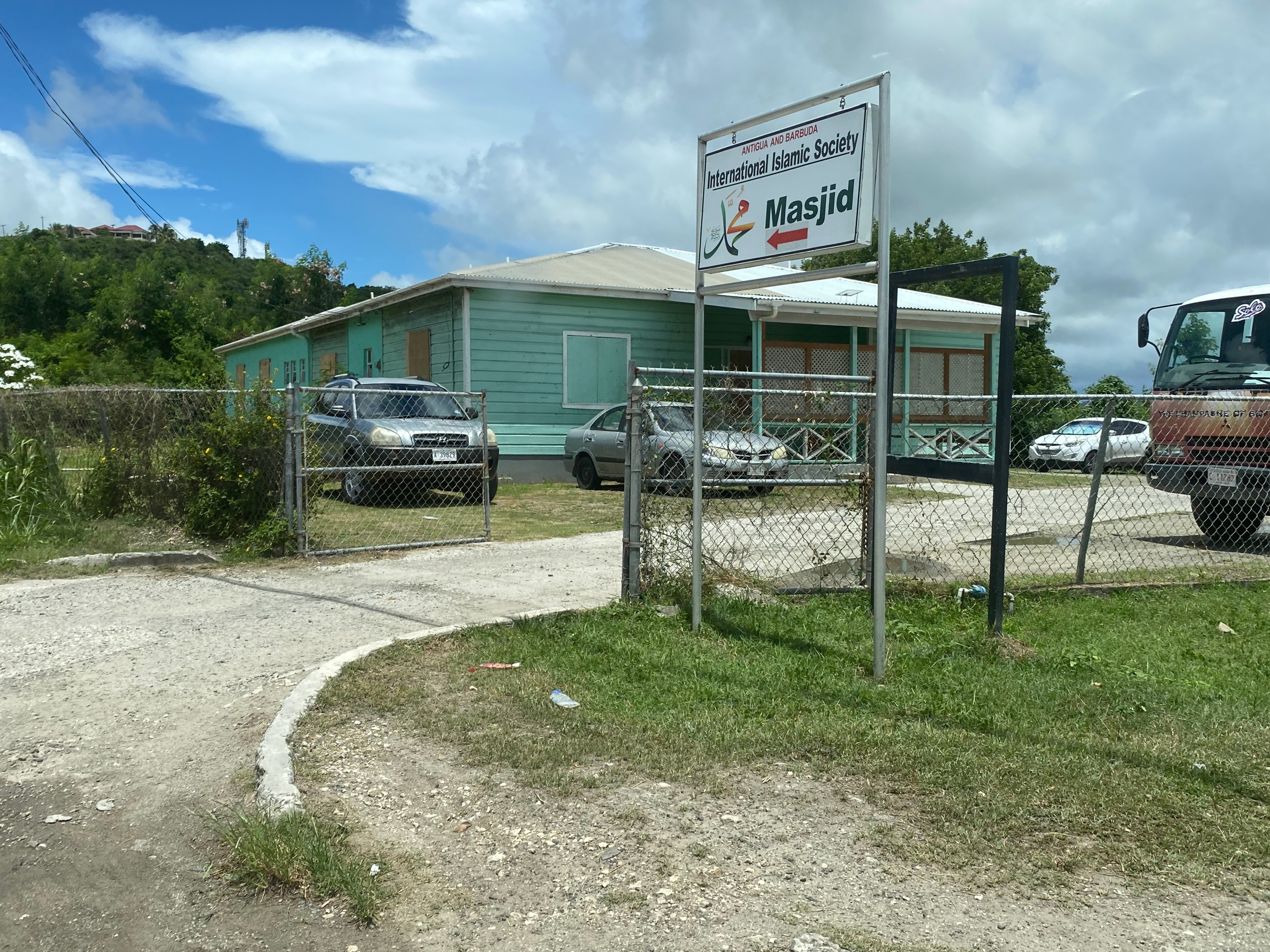
A mosque in Antigua and Barbuda

The statistics for Islam in Antigua and Barbuda estimate a total Muslim population of about 200, representing 0.3 percent of the total population of 67,448. Most of the Muslims of the islands are Arabs of Syrian or Lebanese descent. There are two known Islamic organizations in St. John's, including the Antigua and Barbuda International Islamic Society and the American University of Antigua (School of Medicine) Muslim Students Association. There is also an Ahmadiyya mission in Antigua. A Pew Research Center survey in 2016 calculated the total number to be around 950.

Antigua and Barbuda have yet to establish a proper mosque, Islamic centre or institutions for Muslims in the country. The proposed site of the first mosque to be constructed by the Antigua and Barbuda International Islamic Society (ABIIS) is located on American Road in St. John's. Currently, the location used for a mosque is a small hut that could accommodate about thirty individuals and is available for Friday prayers, the five daily Salat, the two Eids and Qurbani.
