= Islam in Solomon Islands =

Solomon Islands is an overwhelmingly Christian majority country, with adherents of Islam being a minuscule minority. Because of the secular nature of the country's constitution, Muslims are free to proselytize and build places of worship in the country.

The arrival and establishment of the Islamic Religion in the country can be traced back to the early 1980s. Islam Ahmadiyya, however, first reached Solomon Islands probably in 1987, when a Ghanaian missionary by the name of Al-Hajj Hafiz Ahmad Jibreel Saeed visited Guadalcanal.

Today, there are two major Islamic branches (denomination) in the country, the Ahmadiyya Muslim Community and Sunni Islam. According to a 2007 report by the United States Department of State's International Religious Freedom Report, there are approximately 350 Muslims in the country. However, in 2008, an article in the Australian Journal of International Affairs suggested that there may be as many as 1,000 Ahmadis in the country alone, or 0.14% of the population.
