= Islam in Grenada =

Grenada is mainly a secular but Christian majority country, with adherents of Islam being minority. Due to secular nature of the Grenada's constitution, Muslims are free to proselytize and build places of worship in the country. There are over 1,500 Muslims in Grenada. They make up 0.75% of the population.

== Culture ==
There are two prominent mosques in Grenada, although mosques can be found across the island. The Muslims of Grenada have close relations with Trinidadian Muslims.

== See also ==
- Islam in Trinidad and Tobago
