= Islam in Montserrat =

Islam in Montserrat (Arabic:, الإسلام في منتسيرات) is a minority religion. According to the Pew Research Center (Pew Research Center) for 2009, adherents of Islam make up 0.1% of the population of Montserrat (4,649 people, as of 2018).

According to the 2001 United States Central Intelligence Agency, the main religion in Montserrat is Christianity (Protestant 67.1%, including Anglican 21.8%, Methodist 17%, Pentecostal 14.1%, Seventh-day Adventist 10.5%, and Church of God 3.7%), Catholic 11.6%, Rastafarian 1.4%, other 6.5%, atheist 2.6%, and undeclared 10.8%.

== History ==
From the 1660s, sugarcane was grown on plantations established by the French on the island, and large numbers of slaves were brought from Africa to cultivate and process it. It was during this period that the first Muslims arrived on the island. In 1678, the total number of slaves was 1,000, but by 1800, it had reached 7,000, with blacks far outnumbering whites. From 1783, Montserrat came under the full control of Great Britain. After the abolition of slavery in the colonies of the United Kingdom in 1834 and the fall in sugar prices worldwide in the 19th century, limes were grown on an industrial scale on the island and the famous Montserrat lime juice began to be produced. Land was sold to new settlers and lime cultivation was encouraged. On 18 July 1995, the Soufrière Hills volcano erupted, causing widespread damage to the southern part of the island, including Plymouth (Montserrat). en |Plymouth, Montserrat}} suffers major damage, with 2/3 of the island's population fleeing (to neighboring Antigua, Caribbean countries, United Kingdom).

== See also ==
- Islam in America
- Islam in the United Kingdom
- Demographics of Montserrat
