= Muslim population growth =

Analysis of Muslim Growth rate & causes

World Muslim population by percentage (Pew Research Center, 2014)

In 1900, Muslims only numbered 200 million followers or 12% of the world population. This percentage increased over the last 100 years due to a higher birth rate found in Muslim majority countries and reached about 25% or 2 billion in 2025. Pew Research have estimated that the number will be around 2.2 billion in 2030 and 2.8 billion, or 30 percent of the world population, in 2050. This would mean that Islam would almost equal Christianity in terms of population.

== By region ==
=== World ===
The six fastest-growing religions in the world are estimated to be Islam (1.84%), the Baháʼí Faith (1.70%), Sikhism (1.62%), Jainism (1.57%), Hinduism (1.52%), and Christianity (1.38%), with high birth rates being cited as the major reason.

=== Asia ===
Islam is currently the largest religion in Asia. According to the Pew Research Center, 27.3% of the people living in the Asia-Pacific region in 2030 will be Muslim, up from about a quarter in 2010 (24.8%) and 21.6% in 1990.

==== India ====
Islam is the fastest-growing religion in India. Growth rate of Muslims has been consistently higher than the growth rate of others, ever since the census data of independent India has been available. For example, during the 1991–2001 decade, the Muslim growth rate was 29.5% (while others were 19.9%). However, the Muslim population growth rate declined to 24.6% during the decade 2001–2011, in keeping with the similar decline in most religious groups of India.

In India, regarding attitudes "toward birth control," younger (ages 10–19) Muslim women are largely approving. (ages 20–30). Regarding "knowledge of birth control," younger (ages 10–19) Muslim women know less than older (ages 20–30) women do. "Muslim marriages take place earlier" than other religions, and younger (ages 10–19). A 2016 study suggested that urban, north Indian Muslim women's use of contraceptives was more influenced by socioeconomic factors than by religion. Islam makes up 14.2% of the country's population with about 172 million adherents (2011 census). In 2010, India had the second or third largest population of Muslims.

==== China ====
In China, Muslim population growth has been estimated to be as much as 2.7% from 1964 to 1982, however, the Pew Research Center projects a slowing down of Muslim population growth in China. By contrast, China's Christian population growth has been estimated at 4.7% based on total population figures from the year 1949. The number of permitted births in China varies between one and three children depending on geographic area.

=== Europe ===
Islam is the fastest-growing religion in Europe. According to the Pew Research Center, the Muslim population in Europe (excluding Turkey) was about 30 million in 1990, and 44 million in 2010; the Muslim share of the population increased from 4.1% in 1990 to 6% in 2010. In recent years, "Europe has experienced a record influx of asylum seekers fleeing from Syria and predominantly Muslim countries" due to various conflicts in their countries. The wave of Muslim migration has caused debates about immigration and security policies, as well as having raised questions about the current and future number of Muslims in Europe. There were approximately 19 million Muslims in the European Union in 2010 or about (3.8%). Data for the rates of growth of Islam in Europe reveal that the growing number of Muslims is due primarily to immigration. Additionally, average Muslims today are younger and have a higher fertility than other Europeans. Between the mid-2010 and mid-2016, migration was the biggest factor driving the growth of Muslim populations in Europe. Approximately 2.5 million Muslims came to Europe for reasons other than employment and education. Additionally, more than 1.3 million Muslims are expected to or have already received refugee status, allowing them to stay in Europe.

In 2016, the median age of Muslims throughout Europe was 30.4, 13 years younger than the median age of other Europeans. 50% of all European Muslims are younger than 30, however, only 32% of non-Muslims in Europe were under the age of 30. A survey conducted by Pew Research Center in 2016 found that Muslims make up 4.9% of all Europe's population. According to the same study, conversion does not add significantly to the growth of the Muslim population in Europe, with roughly 160,000 more people leaving Islam than converting into Islam between 2010 and 2016.

==== France ====
In France, there are an estimated 100,000 Muslim converts, compared with about 50,000 in 1986. The population mostly originate from the Maghreb, and France is home to a third of EU Muslims. As of mid-2016, there are 5.7 million Muslims in France (8.8% of the population) and the Muslim population continues to grow.

==== Germany ====
In Germany, there are approximately 5 million Muslims (6.1% of the population), and at least 2.3 million trace their origin to Turkey. The "guest worker program" and the domination of Turkish religious authorities have increased German Islam. A report from Pew found "Germany as the top destination for Muslim migrants between 2010 and 2016". Other Muslims have origins in Syria, Tunisia and Afghanistan.

==== United Kingdom ====
The United Kingdom is home to 3.5 million Muslims (6.5% of the population) according to the 2021 census and has the highest number of Muslim migrants. Most originate from South Asia, particularly Pakistan.

== Conversion ==
Counting the number of converts to a religion is difficult, because some national censuses ask people about their religion, but they do not ask if they have converted to their present faith, and, in some countries, legal and social consequences make conversion difficult, such as the death sentence for leaving Islam in some Muslim countries. Statistical data on conversion to and from Islam are scarce. According to a study published in 2011 by Pew Research, what little information is available suggests that religious conversion has no net impact on the global Muslim population as the number of people who convert to Islam is roughly similar to those who leave Islam. According to another study published on 2015 by Pew research center, Islam is expected to experience a modest gain of 3 million adherents through religious conversion between 2010 and 2050, although this modest impact will make Islam, compared with other religions, the second largest religion in terms of net gains through religious conversion after religiously unaffiliated, which expected has the largest net gains through religious conversion.

According to The New York Times, an estimated 25% of American Muslims are converts. In Britain, around 6,000 people convert to Islam per year and, according to a June 2000 article in the British Muslims Monthly Survey, the majority of new Muslim converts in Britain were women. According to The Huffington Post, "observers estimate that as many as 20,000 Americans convert to Islam annually."

According to Pew Research, the number of U.S. converts to Islam is roughly equal to the number of U.S. Muslims who leave the religion, unlike other religions, in which the number of those leaving is greater than the number of converts. 77% of new converts to Islam are from Christianity, whereas 19% were from non-religion. Conversely, 55% of Muslims who left Islam became non-religious, and 22% converted to Christianity. Data from the General Social Survey in the United States show that 32 percent of those raised Muslim no longer embrace Islam in adulthood, and 18 percent hold no religious identification.

According to historian Geoffrey Blainey from the University of Melbourne, since the 1960s, there has been a substantial increase in the number of conversions from Islam to Christianity, mostly to the Evangelical and Pentecostal forms. Many Muslims who convert to Christianity face social and governmental persecution. According to 2015 Believers in Christ from a Muslim Background": A Global Census study published by Baylor University institute for studies of religion, an estimated 10.2 million Muslims have converted to Christianity based on global missionary data. According to Guinness World Records 2003, approximately 12.5 million more people converted to Islam than people converted to Christianity between 1990 and 2000.

Despite this, Islam remains the second religion by number of net converts on the global scale, with about 420,000 more people converting to Islam than leaving Islam between 2015 and 2020. This number being surpassed by the number of people (7,570,000) switching from "religious" to "unaffiliated".

== Historical Muslim population ==
Historical estimate of Muslim population in the World.
Year	World population	Muslim population	Islamic followers´ share (%)
1800	1 billion	91 million	(9.1%)
1900	1.6 billion	200 million	(12.5%)
1970	3.7 billion	577 million	(15.6%)
2000	6.14 billion	1.291 billion	(21%)
2013	7.21 billion	1.635 billion	(22.7%)
2016	7.46 billion	1.8 billion	(24.1%)
2030	8.57 billion	2.2 billion	(est. 26%)
2050	9.7 billion	2.8 billion	(est. 30%)

== See also ==
- Christian population growth
- Projections of population growth
- List of countries by past and projected future population
- Great Replacement conspiracy theory
- Growth of religion
- Islam by country
- Islamic Missionary Activity
- List of religious populations
- List of converts to Islam
