= Māori Muslims =

Muslim community in New Zealand

Māori Muslims are a small minority community in New Zealand.

Muslim Students Performing Haka.

== Growth ==
Islam was estimated to be the fastest growing religion among the Māori, however, recently, there is only a growth of 39 individuals in 12 years between 2006 and 2018. Census figures showing the number of Muslims of Māori ethnicity increasing from 99 to 708 from 1991 to 2001. The Māori Muslim population thereafter virtually stabilised from 1,077 in 2006 to 1,083 in 2013 to 1,116 in 2018. Despite this, the 2006 Māori Muslim community was no more than 0.19 percent of the Māori population (565,329). Traditional beliefs form the background of most Māori religious thought, with others belonging to one of several Christian churches, or syncretic churches such as Rātana.

The leader of the now-defunct Aotearoa Māori Muslim Association (AMMA), Te Amorangi Izhaq Kireka-Whaanga, was identified among The 500 Most Influential Muslims.

They assert that Islam's strict rules and self-discipline are a positive force in Māori development.

In 1990 the Federation of Islamic Associations of New Zealand organized the first official meeting between Māori and immigrant Muslims at a Wellington Marae. In 2003 the Muslim Association of Canterbury arranged a "National Māori Muslim Day" event at both the Al Noor Mosque and the Ngā Hau e Whā National Marae in Aranui.

== Māori Quran translation ==
In 2008, Indian translator Mr. Shakil Ahmad Monir gave the first copy of the Qur'an that he translated into the Māori language to Mirza Masroor Ahmad (Caliph of the Ahmadiyya Muslim Community) as a gift for the blessings of the Khilafat Centennial year in 2008. It took Mr. Monir nearly twenty years to publish the first half of the Qur'an, which is referred to as the Kuranu Tapu in the Māori language.

Mr Monir spent a period of time in New Zealand and abroad doing this work. He established a team consisting of Mr. Mohammed Iqbal VRD, JP and Mr. Mohammed Shahid to assist him with the logistics of this project.

Mr Monir travelled to New Zealand in 2010 for the launch of the Kuranu Tapu. He was honoured to represent this event as the official representative of Mirza Masroor Ahmad, Khalifatul Masih V and as the author of the translation. He spent numerous hours to ensure that the translation work was a close as possible to the original Arabic text in which the Qur'an was revealed.

A copy of this Qur'an was also presented to King Tūheitia at a marae outside Hamilton, which gave Mr. Monir an opportunity to address a large group of Māori in their own language, he said. He said, It was so nice, the people cheered after I'd finished.

The Ahmadiyya Muslim Community is the first Muslim organization to translate the first half of the Qur'an into the Māori language.

== See also ==
- Islam in New Zealand
- Lists of Muslims
- Māori Indians

== Literature ==
- Drury, Abdullah, Islam in New Zealand: The First Mosque (Christchurch, 2007) ISBN 978-0-473-12249-2
- Drury, Abdullah, Treaty compatible with Islamic philosophy in The Press (6 February 2009), page 6.
- Yvonne Tahana, Koran's message of unity shared in te reo translation in The New Zealand Herald (15 April 2010), page.A11.)
- "The 500 Most Influential Muslims - 2010" by The Royal Islamic Strategic Studies Centre (Amman, 2010)
- ARKILIC, Ayca (2025-09-01). "Securitization and the intersectionality of bias: Voices of Māori and non-Māori women converts to Islam in post-Christchurch attack Aotearoa New Zealand". Social Compass. 72 (3): 404–424. doi:10.1177/00377686251331495. ISSN 0037-7686.
- Kadirov, Djavlonbek; Allayarova, Nilufar; Boulanouar, Aisha Wood (2016-01-01). "Transformation as reversion to fitrah: Muslim Māori women's self-transformation through reflexive consumption". Journal of Business Research. 69 (1): 33–44. doi:10.1016/j.jbusres.2015.07.018. ISSN 0148-2963.
- "Māori Muslims in New Zealand: a marginalised minority within a minority | Te Pae Rangahau Tauhōkai Ahurea / Centre for Applied Cross-cultural Research | Te Herenga Waka". Victoria University of Wellington. 2025-09-03.
- Cassim, Shemana; Khan-Janif, Jennifer; Martiarini, Nuke (2023), "Building Enduring Relationships for a Shared Sense of Belonging: Culturally Derived Solidarities Between Muslim Migrants and Māori", in Terruhn, Jessica; Cassim, Shemana (eds.), Transforming the Politics of Mobility and Migration in Aotearoa New Zealand, Anthem Press, pp. 157–172, ISBN 978-1-83998-344-3
- Wellington, Victoria University of (2023-09-05). "What is Islam's appeal to Māori? | News | Te Herenga Waka". Victoria University of Wellington.
