= Islam in São Tomé and Príncipe =

Ahmadiyya Islam is a fast growing religion in São Tomé and Príncipe. Muslims comprise 1 percent of the population of São Tomé and Príncipe. São Tomé and Príncipe was for many years a colony of Portugal, which is overwhelmingly Catholic.

== History ==
Before 1970, there were no recorded Muslims in São Tomé and Príncipe. After independence, the religion was introduced by immigrants from the neighbouring countries of Nigeria and Cameroon, which led to a rise in the number of Muslims in São Tomé and Príncipe, from zero in 1970 to 51 in 1994 and 64 in 2009. However, according to M. Ali Kettani in Muslims Minorities (1986) that the Muslim population in São Tomé and Príncipe was closer to 1,000 and comparable with that of Cape Verde and Equatorial Guinea.

== Population ==
According to the International Religious Freedom Report 2006, some three percent of the population are Muslim, although the total number of Muslims in the country has increased due to an influx of illegal immigrants from neighbouring Nigeria and Cameroon. The Ahmadiyya Muslim Community claims to have "hundreds" of members in the country, thereby representing a large proportion of the Muslim population. However, according to a 2009 study by the Pew Research Center, Muslims in São Tomé and Príncipe make up less than 0.1% of the population.
