= Islam in French Guiana =

Islam is a minority religion in French Guiana. The Muslim population is made up of mainly Arabs from Lebanon, and Afghan Muslims which is nearly 1%. In Cayenne, the capital of the region, and Kourou, there is an Islamic centre and a Muslim school. The majority of the Muslims are Sunnis. There are a few Ahmadi Muslims who established themselves in the region in the year 2007.

== See also ==
- Islam in France
- Religion in French Guiana
