= Islam in Aruba =

Overview of Islam as a minority religion in Aruba

Islam in Aruba is a small minority religion on the Caribbean island of Aruba. The Muslim population, primarily located in Oranjestad, represents less than 1% of the island’s total population.

== Demographics ==
Estimates of Aruba’s Muslim population range from approximately 500 individuals, making up roughly 0.5% of the total population. The U.S. Department of State’s International Religious Freedom Report (2022) cites the 2010 census: around 75.3% identified as Roman Catholic, 4.9% Protestant, 1.7% Jehovah’s Witness, 5.5% no religion, and 12% “other”—a category that includes Muslim residents.

== History ==
Detailed historical records of early Muslim migration to Aruba are sparse. The Muslim presence is believed to have increased in recent decades through migration from countries including Lebanon, Syria, Suriname, Nigeria, Egypt, and others, as well as community formation around the establishment of a mosque.

== Religious life ==
The central institution is the Aruba Islamic Foundation (also known as Islamic Center of Aruba), based in Oranjestad. It offers Jumʿah prayers, community services, religious education, and hosts weddings (nikāḥs), though full mosque amenities (e.g. wudu areas) remain under development.

== Religious freedom and integration ==
Aruba’s constitution enshrines freedom of religion. Religious organizations are not obliged to register unless pursuing tax-exempt status. There have been no notable cases of religious persecution or institutional restriction of Muslim practice.

== Community composition ==
The Muslim community in Aruba is ethnically diverse, with roots in countries such as Lebanon, Syria, Nigeria, Egypt, Suriname, as well as diaspora communities from North America and Europe.

== See also ==
- Religion in Aruba
- Islam in the Netherlands
- Islam in the Americas
- Aruba First Mosque
