= Islam in Guadeloupe =

Islam in Guadeloupe is a minority religion in the region.

== History ==
Islam began to spread in the region in the 1940s. In the early 1990s, the idea to construct a mosque was proposed, but the plan was halted midway.

== Demographics ==
As of 2009, there were around 1000-2,000 Muslims in Guadeloupe, representing about 0.4-0.3% of the population.

== Organizations ==
- Guadeloupe Muslim Association, established in 2015
- Jamaat-e-Ahmadiyya Guadeloupe, established in 2016

== See also ==
- Demographics of Guadeloupe
