= Islam in Saint Lucia =

There is a very small Muslim community (150-400) in Saint Lucia. The community is made up of mainly converts or locals, who are of African descent, but who also include immigrants from the Middle East, South Asia and other Caribbean countries.According to a 2009 Pew Research Center report, Muslims constitute approximately 0.1% of the population in Saint Lucia.The rate at which people embrace Islam is on average 1-2 per month, mainly males.

== History ==
Islam has been revived in St Lucia in the early 1990s.

== Demographics ==
The majority of Muslims in the country constitute local African descent converts and also immigrants from Middle East and South Asia.

== Organizations ==
Registered in 2020, the Islamic Association of Saint Lucia is the organization representing the Muslims in the country.

- ASLAM - Association of Saint Lucian Muslims.

== Mosque ==
There are only a few small places of worship: two in the capital Castries and one in Vieux Fort, Saint Lucia.

- The Morne Masjid in Castries, located in the Morne district of Castries, has separate rooms for Muslims and Islamic studies.
- The An-Noor Mosque in Castries
- The Masjidur Rahman Mosque and Islamic Foundation in Vieux Fort

== See also ==
- Demographics of Saint Lucia
