= Islam in the United States Virgin Islands =

Islam in the United States Virgin Islands (Islam in the United States Virgin Islands, الإسلام في جزر العذراء الأمريكية) is a minority religion. At present, there are approximately 1,200 Muslims living in this territory.

== History ==
According to the Central Intelligence Agency's World Factbook, more than 95% of the population (87,146 people as of 2020) in the US-governed islands (a group of nine islands in the Caribbean Sea) identify as Christians — including 65.5% Protestants and 27.1% Catholics, among others. Around 6% follow minority religions, such as Rastafari, Judaism, Buddhism, Hinduism, and Islam. The followers of these faiths began settling in the islands from Europe, the Middle East, and the Caribbean Basin from the 18th century onward. With the establishment of sugar plantations by the Danish West India Company, enslaved people were brought from Africa, some of whom were Muslims.

=== Modern Era ===
The growth of Islam in the territory began in the 1960s, with Muslims migrating primarily from other Caribbean islands, South Asia, and Middle Eastern countries in search of employment. Many brought their families and eventually settled on the islands. Today, there are about 500 Muslims in the U.S. Virgin Islands who are of Arab (including Palestinians, Egyptians, and Jordanians), Pakistani, African, and continental U.S. origin.

== Islamic Organisation ==
The only Islamic organisation on the islands is the non-profit and independent "Masjid Nur Ahl-Us Sunnah". Despite some challenges, efforts are made to maintain unity among Muslims. In a region predominantly inhabited by Christians, Muslims strive to come together and strengthen their community.

== Mosque ==
The first Islamic centre in the U.S. Virgin Islands was established in 1978 in the capital city of Charlotte Amalie, U.S. Virgin Islands, located on Saint Thomas, U.S. Virgin Islands. It began with the founding of the Muhammad Mosque, which was later renamed Masjid Nur Ahl-Us Sunnah. Given that tourism is the main economic activity on Saint Thomas, Muslims visiting the island from various countries are welcomed. The mosque provides religious education and organises religious celebrations and community events.

== Islamic School ==
In 1998, the first Islamic school — Iqra Academy (www.iqravi.org) — was established on Saint Croix. The academy was founded to provide education to both Muslim and non-Muslim children (including girls). It offers faith-based education from preschool to 12th grade. The campus, covering more than seven acres, overlooks the scenic tropical landscape and the Caribbean Sea.
