= Islam in the Cayman Islands =

Islam in the Cayman Islands is a minority religion. according to 2021 census 258 muslims are in cayman which is 0.4%.

== History ==
Muslims have been residing in the Cayman Islands—a maritime territory of Great Britain located in the Caribbean Sea basin—since the early 1970s.

In December 1981, very few Muslim families lived on the islands, and most were employed at the branch of the BCCI holding situated on the island of Grand Cayman (BCCI Overseas). Following the bank’s closure in 1991, many Muslim families subsequently left the island.

The Friday prayers were originally held in the private apartment of a Muslim employed at the BCCI branch; however, after that individual was transferred abroad for work, the practice of assembling for worship ceased.

From 1992, Friday prayers resumed in the apartment of another Muslim. At that time, only a few people (three or four) took part. With the addition of Muslims who had migrated from Indonesia, community activities were revitalised and opportunities to disseminate information about Islam increased. As a result, the majority of the island’s Muslims began to attend Friday prayers on a regular basis.

A few years later, the Islamic Sunday School was established. Initially organised in the town hall of George Town, Cayman Islands, the capital of the islands, it was later relocated due to high rental costs and accessibility issues with the building. For ten years, the school operated from the private residence of one Muslim, during which time a Quran reciter class was conducted, Arabic language courses were offered, and the daily offering of the five Prayer took place. Five children successfully completed their studies of the Quran.

In September 2004, collective gatherings for Friday prayers were suspended for several months following the devastation wrought by Hurricane Ivan, which struck the Cayman Islands, damaging 85% of the buildings.

In 2007, a building was acquired for use as a mosque, where daily prayers have since been organised.

Over the last 20 years, the Muslim community on the island has grown considerably. Additionally, Muslim students now come to Cayman University Insaalawo to pursue their education.

== Mosque ==
The islands do not have an established Mosque, however, there are public halls set aside for worship and religious events. Because the Muslim population is so small (121 person or 0.17% out of population of 71,105), the community is more close-knit and will gather at a friend’s home for worship if there are no available halls. The Islamic Society of the Cayman Islands was also established to reach out to fellow Muslims in the country and provide a place for free and safe worship.Muslim community in the Cayman Islands is relatively small. Members of the Islamic Society include migrants from Afghanistan, Indonesia, India, Pakistan, South Africa, Mauritius, and Guyana, as well as local converts to Islam.

The society is led by Muzaffar Soomro, who has been a resident of the Cayman Islands for 35 years.

== Notable Muslims ==
- Anwar Choudhury, Governor of the Cayman Islands (2014-2018)

== See also ==
- Demographics of the Cayman Islands
