= Conversion to Islam =

Religious conversion

Conversion to Islam, also known within Islam as reversion, is adopting Islam as a religion or faith. Conversion requires a formal statement of the shahādah, the credo of Islam, whereby the prospective convert must state that "I bear witness that there is no god but God, and I bear witness that Muhammad is the Messenger of God". Some Shia Muslims also include a profession that "Ali is the friend of God", although many do not view this as a requirement for conversion. Proselytism of the faith is referred to as "dawah", and missionary efforts have been promoted since the dawn of the religion in the 7th century.

== Terminology ==
Converts to Islam may be referred to as "converts", "reverts", or "new Muslims". Many people who have converted to Islam prefer to call themselves "reverts", in reference to a hadith that says that all people are Muslims at birth, but only come to "leave" the faith due to the environment they are raised in. The belief in the innate condition of Islam in all people is referred to as "fitra".

== Requirements ==
Converting to Islam requires one to declare the shahādah, the Muslim profession of faith ("there is none worthy of worship except Allah and Muhammad is the messenger of Allah", Classical Arabic: أَشْهَدُ أَن لا إِلٰهَ إلَّا الله و أَشْهَدُ أَنَ مُحَمَّدًا رَسُول الله)

In Islam, circumcision (khitan) is considered a sunnah custom that is not mentioned in the Quran but is mentioned in hadith. The majority of clerical opinions holds that circumcision is not required upon entering the Muslim faith.

== Islamic missionary activities ==
Dawah (Arabic: دعوة, lit. 'invitation', Arabic: [ˈdaʕwah]) is the act of inviting or calling people to embrace Islam. In Islamic theology, the purpose of da‘wah is to invite people, Muslims and non-Muslims, to understand the worship of God as expressed in the Qur'an and the sunnah of Muhammad and to inform them about Muhammad.

Dawah as the "Call towards God" is the means by which Muhammad began spreading the message of the Quran to mankind. After Muhammad, his followers and the Muslim community assumed responsibility for it. They convey the message of the Qur'an by providing information on why and how the Qur'an preaches monotheism.

== Conversion rate ==
Counting the number of converts to a religion is difficult, because some national censuses ask people about their religion, but they do not ask if they have converted to their present faith, and, in some countries, legal and social consequences make conversion difficult, such as the death sentence for leaving Islam in some Muslim countries. Statistical data on conversion to and from Islam are scarce. An expert on Islamic law, M. Cherif Bassiouni, states "The Quran contains a provision that says ‘he who has embraced Islam and then abandons it will receive punishment in hell after Judgment Day'." According to a study published in 2011 by Pew Research, what little information is available suggests that religious conversion has no net impact on the global Muslim population as the number of people who convert to Islam is roughly similar to those who leave Islam.

According to the religious forecast for 2050 by Pew Research Center, between 2010 and 2050 modest net gains through religious conversion are expected for Muslims (3 million) and most of the net gains through religious conversion for Muslims found in the Sub Saharan Africa (2.9 million). A Pew study published on 2026, projected that about 8 million more people would leave Islam than join it worldwide between 2020 and 2070. Between 2020 and 2025, Pew estimated that about 300,000 more people left Islam than joined it worldwide. Over the same period, births in the global Muslim population outnumbered deaths by nearly 182 million. Religious switching therefore had little effect on the overall growth of the Muslim population.

According to projections published by the Pew Research Center on 2026, the number of Muslims expected to become Christians between 2020 and 2070 (9.2 million) slightly exceeds the number of Christians expected to become Muslims (9 million). Switching between the two faiths would therefore result in a net gain of about 200,000 for Christianity. According to Pew, the projected growth of the Muslim population is not due to Christians converting to Islam.

According to The New York Times in 2005, an estimated 25% of American Muslims are converts. In Britain, around 6,000 people convert to Islam per year and, according to a June 2000 article in the British Muslims Monthly Survey, the majority of new Muslim converts in Britain were women. According to The Huffington Post, "Though exact numbers are difficult to tally, observers estimate that as many as 20,000 Americans convert to Islam annually." In the Philippines, approximately 220,000 people converted to Islam in 2011, known as balik-Islam (lit. 'return to Islam'). The number is increasing year by year, and a surge in conversions is expected in the coming years.

According to Pew Research, the number of U.S. converts to Islam is roughly equal to the number of U.S. Muslims who leave the religion, unlike other religions, in which the number of those leaving is greater than the number of converts. 77% of new converts to Islam are from Christianity, whereas 19% were from non-religion. Meanwhile, among American-born Muslims who have left Islam, about 55% now identify with no religion, 22% identify as Christian, and another 21% identify with other faiths.

According to Guinness, approximately 12.5 million more people converted to Islam than people converted to Christianity between 1990 and 2000.

Despite this, Islam remains, on the global level, the religion with the second largest number of net converts, with about 420,000 more people converting to Islam than leaving Islam between 2015 and 2020, this number being surpassed by the number of people (7,570,000) switching from "religious" to "unaffiliated".

In 2010, the Pew Forum found "that statistical data for Muslim conversions is scarce and as per their little available information, there is no substantial net gain or loss of Muslims due to religious conversion. It also stated that "the number of people who embrace Islam and the number of those who leave Islam are roughly equal. Thus, this report excludes religious conversion as a direct factor from the projection of Muslim population growth." People switching their religions will likely have no effect on the growth of the Muslim population, as the number of people who convert to Islam is roughly similar to those who leave Islam. Another study found that the number of people who will leave Islam is 9,400,000 and the number of converts to Islam is 12,620,000 so the net gain to Islam through conversion should be 3 million between 2010 and 2050, mostly from Sub Saharan Africa (2.9 million).

According to a 2017 Pew Research Center survey, between 2010 and 2015 "an estimated 213 million babies were born to Muslim mothers and roughly 61 million Muslims died, meaning that the natural increase in the Muslim population – i.e., the number of births minus the number of deaths – was 152 million over this period", and it added small net gains through religious conversion into Islam (420,000). According to a 2017 Pew Research Center survey, by 2060 Muslims will remain the world's second largest religion; and if current trends continue, the number of Muslims will reach 2.9 billion (or 31.1%).

It was reported in 2013 that around 5,000 British people convert to Islam every year, with most of them being women. According to an earlier 2001 census, surveys found that there was an increase of 60,000 conversions to Islam in the United Kingdom. Many converts to Islam said that they suffered from hostility from their families. According to a report by CNN, "Islam has drawn converts from all walks of life, most notably African Americans". Studies estimated about 30,000 converting to Islam annually in the United States. According to The New York Times, an estimated 25% of American Muslims are converts, these converts are mostly African American. According to The Huffington Post, "observers estimate that as many as 20,000 Americans convert to Islam annually.", most of them are women and African Americans. Experts say that conversions to Islam have doubled in the past 25 years in France, among the six million Muslims in France, about 100,000 are converts. On the other hand, according to Pew Research, the number of American converts to Islam is roughly equal to the number of American Muslims who leave Islam and this is unlike other religions in the United States where the number of those who leave these religions is greater than the number of those who convert to it, and most people who leave Islam become unaffiliated. According to the same study, ex-Muslims were more likely to be Christians compared to ex-Hindus or ex-Jews.

== See also ==
- Apostasy in Islam
- Islamic missionary activity
- Spread of Islam
- Al-Baqara 256
- List of converts to Islam
- Conversion to Islam in prisons
- Muslim population growth
