= Islam in New Caledonia =

Islam in New Caledonia is a minority faith, consisting of 2.6% of population or 6,357 people. The community is largely ethnic Javanese, and primarily speaks French, and Arabic or Indonesian, causing a linguistic gap between them and neighbouring Anglophone Muslim communities in Australia and Fiji. There is an Islamic centre in Nouméa, and another in Bourail catering to Algerian-Caledonians.

== History ==
Among the first Muslims in New Caledonia were Algerian prisoners sent there in 1872, followed by Indonesian, Somali, and Arab labourers.

The Association des Musulmans de Nouvelle Caledonie (New Caledonia Muslim Association) was founded in 1975, superseding an earlier organisation.
