= Islam in Central Asia =

Muslims in Central Asia
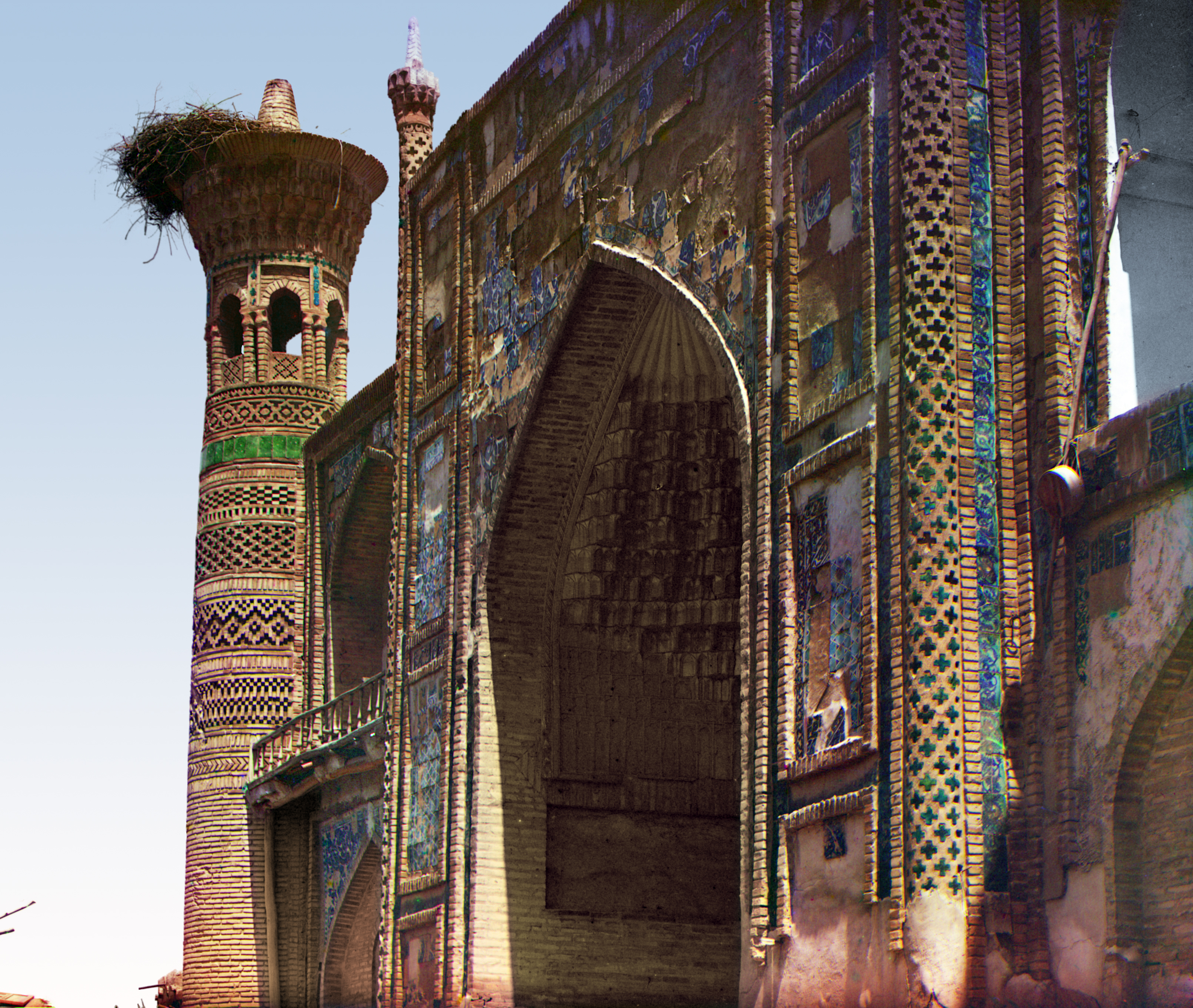
- Madrassa in Bukhara

Total population
- c. 72 million (95%)

Religions
- Sunni Islam

Languages
- Liturgical: Quranic Arabic; Common; Some Turkic languages, Russian, Tajik (Persian)

Muslims Percentage per Country
Country	Percent
Tajikistan	98%
Turkmenistan	96.1%
Uzbekistan	96.5%
Kyrgyzstan	90.6%
Kazakhstan	70%

Islam in Central Asia has existed since the beginning of Islamic history. Non-denominational and Sunni branch of Islam is the most widely practiced religion in Central Asia. Shiism of Imami and Ismaili denominations predominating in the Pamir plateau and the western Tian Shan mountains (almost exclusively Ismailis), while boasting to a large minority population in the Zarafshan river valley, from Samarkand to Bukhara (almost exclusively Imamis). Islam came to Central Asia in the early part of the 8th century as part of the Muslim conquest of the region. Many well-known Islamic scientists and philosophers came from Central Asia, and several major Muslim empires, including the Timurid Empire and the Mughal Empire, originated in Central Asia. In the 20th century, severe restrictions on religious practice were enacted by the Soviet Union in Soviet Central Asia and the People's Republic of China in Xinjiang.

== History ==
=== Arrival of Islam and Medieval period ===
Age of the Caliphs Expansion under Muhammad, 622–632/A.H. 1-11 Expansion during the Rashidun Caliphate, 632–661/A.H. 11-40 Expansion during the Umayyad Caliphate, 661–750/A.H. 40-129

Urban centers were the first to adopt Islam in the region due to many socio-political and economic institutions coming under the influence of Muslim leadership. Rural regions were Islamized significantly later. While urban areas generally tended to be spiritually influenced by the ulema, Sufi mystics held prominent authority in the rural regions.

=== Russian Empire ===
After conquests in the region by the Russian Empire in the 1860s and 1870s, western Central Asia came under Russian control and was incorporated into the empire as a Governor-Generalship led by Konstantin von Kaufman. Russian authorities debated what position they should take on Islam in the newly conquered territories. Some advocated a policy of religious repression, citing the ongoing Dungan Revolt in the neighboring Qing Empire as proof of the potential "threat" of Islam. Others, such as General Kaufman and his superior Dmitry Milyutin, preferred a policy of mild religious tolerance. Kaufman was nevertheless concerned about pan-Islam movements that would cause the Muslims of Russian Turkistan to view anyone other than the czar as their ruler.

=== Soviet Union ===
While the practice of Islam was broadly tolerated by the Russian Empire during its rule over Central Asia from the mid-1860s to 1917, the advent of Soviet rule following the Russian Revolutions of 1917 and the subsequent civil war brought with it Marxist opposition to religion. During the first few years of Bolshevik rule in the early 1920s, Soviet officials took a pragmatic approach by prioritizing other goals (attempting to modernize culture, building schools, improving the position of women) in order to solidify their hold on Central Asia. During this time, the Bolsheviks cooperated with the Jadids (Muslims working towards social and cultural reforms such as improved education) to accomplish their goals. In the process, the Bolsheviks created a new political elite favorable towards Marxist ideology by using propaganda and appointing officials favorable towards their policies during the division of Central Asia into separate republics along ethnic lines in the 1920s and 1930s.

In 1926, the Soviet government decided it had consolidated control over Central Asia sufficiently to shift official policy from toleration of Islam to condemnation. The government closed private religious schools in favor of state-run public ones. Between 1927 and 1929, the state ran a campaign to shut down mosques in Central Asia. This operation was not well documented, but existing accounts indicate that it was often violent and poorly controlled, often carried out by self-appointed officials who arrested imams and destroyed buildings, denouncing Islam as an enemy of communism.

Despite these assaults, Islam in Central Asia survived Soviet rule in the following decades. However, it was transformed in the process: instead of part of the public sphere, Islam became family-oriented, "localized and rendered synonymous with custom and tradition." This led to a homogenization of practice; as religious authorities could not publish treatises or often even communicate with one another, the store of religious knowledge available vastly decreased. Additionally, Islam was largely removed from the public discourse, especially in terms of its influence on morals and ethical values. What religious practice that was permitted by the Soviet government was regulated by the Spiritual Administration of the Muslims of Central Asia and Kazakhstan.

=== 1980s, 1990s, and Islamic Revival ===
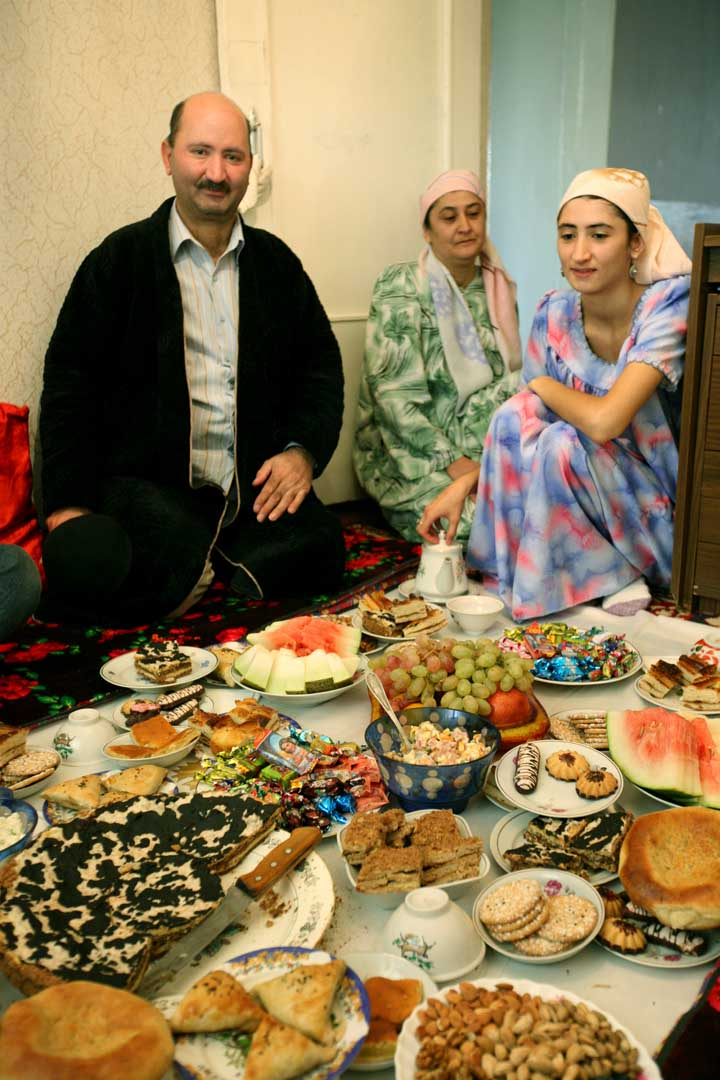
Muslim family in Tajikistan celebrating Eid-i Fatr

The policy of glasnost put into practice by Mikhail Gorbachev in the mid-1980s meant that by 1988 the Soviet government relaxed its controls on Islam. As a result, there was a rapid religious revival, including new mosques, literature, and the return of private religious schooling. Many Central Asians were interested in the ethical and spiritual values that Islam could offer.

The revival accelerated further following the collapse of the Soviet Union in 1991. For many, Islam constituted a national heritage that had been repressed during the Soviet era. Additionally, relaxed travel restrictions under Gorbachev enabled cultural exchange with other Muslim countries; Saudi Arabia, for example, sent copies of the Qur'an into the Soviet Union in the late 1980s. Islam, as practiced in Central Asia, became much more varied in this short time. Furthermore, Islam was attractive because it offered alternatives and solutions to the myriad political and economic problems facing the republics in the wake of the Soviet Union's collapse.

However, the governments of the Central Asian republics were wary of Islam in the political sphere. Their fears of undue influence were soon justified by the outbreak of the Tajik Civil War in 1992, between the Tajik government and a coalition of opponents led by a radical Islamist group called the Islamic Renaissance Party. The civil war, which lasted until 1997, demonstrated to the other former Soviet republics the dangers posed by Islamic opposition groups. The takeover in 1996 of Afghanistan by the Taliban further emphasized that threat.

The Islamic Renaissance Party (IRP) was one of several similar Islamic opposition groups, including the Islamic Movement of Uzbekistan (IMU), which also fought against the Tajik government in the civil war. The IRP had its origins in underground Islamic groups in the Soviet Union. It was formed in 1990 in Astrakhan by a group consisting mostly of Tatar intellectuals, with separate branches for each Soviet republic. It was in fact registered as an official political party in Russia, but was banned by the Central Asian communist governments. Partly as a result of this oppression, political opposition erupted into the violence of the civil war in Tajikistan, in which over 50,000 people were killed out of a population of 6 million and another 250,000 fled the country to Afghanistan, Uzbekistan or elsewhere. Following the civil war, the Tajik government incorporated Islamic groups into the government in order to prevent future tensions. However, the other Central Asian republics did not follow this example, continuing instead to repress and persecute Islamic groups rather than allow them to participate in the political process.

=== 21st century ===
Following the attacks of September 11, 2001, foreign powers took a much greater interest in preventing the spread of radical Islamic terrorist organizations such as the IMU. The Central Asian republics offered their territory and airspace for use by the US and its allies in operations against the Taliban in Afghanistan, and the international community recognized the importance of ensuring stability in Central Asia in order to combat terrorism.

In Uzbekistan, the government took advantage of this shift in international attitude in order to erode the position of Islam in politics, taking steps such as forbidding the hijab in public schools and reducing the legal rights of Islamic groups.

Since 2001, ethnic and religious tensions in the Central Asian republics combined with endemic poverty and poor economic performance have made them increasingly volatile. However, governments as often use Islamic groups as a justification for repression and crackdowns as those groups are the cause of violence, if not more often. For example, in May 2005 the Uzbek government massacred over 700 of its own civilians demonstrating following a trial of 23 suspected Islamic radicals, saying that they were terrorists. Though the events of the massacre were complex, this simplistic account appears to be false; instead, it was a case of the Uzbek government repressing peaceful protesters, perhaps attempting to prevent the sort of popular revolt that had occurred two months earlier in Kyrgyzstan, toppling President Askar Akayev. Overall, Islamic militancy in Central Asia is not a major threat to regional stability compared to the myriad social and economic problems—such environmental devastation around the Aral Sea, endemic poverty, poor education—that plague the region. Central Asian expert Adeeb Khalid, writes that the situation in Central Asia demonstrates most of all that Islam is a complex phenomenon that rejects easy categorization into "good" and "bad," "moderate" and "extremist," and that the form Islam takes in Central Asia is not the same as the form it takes elsewhere. "For observers," he writes, "it is critical to have perspective, to discern clearly the political stakes at issue...and to separate the disinformation dished out by the regimes from the actual conduct of Muslims."

== See also ==
- Holiest sites in Sunni Islam
- Islam in Afghanistan
- Islam in China
- Islam in Kazakhstan
- Islam in Kyrgyzstan
- Islam in Mongolia
- Islam in Tajikistan
- Islam in Turkmenistan
- Islam in Uzbekistan
- Ziyarat
- List of ziyarat locations
