= Muslims =

Adherents of Islam

- The name of Allah, a common symbol of the Muslim people

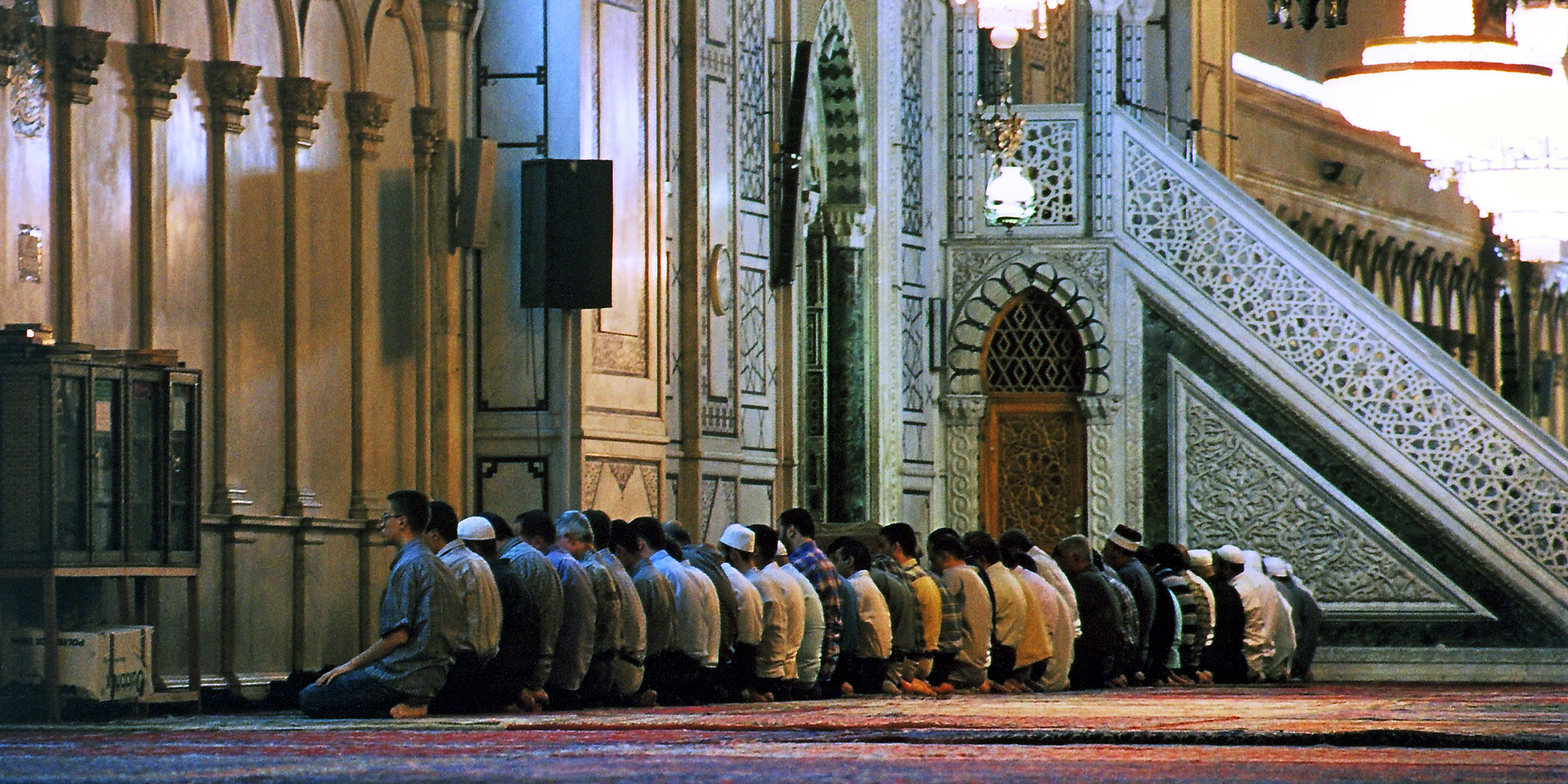
- The Muslim worshippers are performing salah inside a mosque, reflecting the enduring tradition of communal prayer

Total population
- c. 2 billion (25.6% of the global population)▲ (Worldwide, 2020 est.)

Founder
- Muhammad, according to Sīrah

Regions with significant populations
- Indonesia: 238,990,000
- Pakistan: 226,880,000
- India: 213,060,000
- Bangladesh: 151,440,000
- Nigeria: 119,980,000
- Egypt: 104,040,000
- Iran: 87,520,000
- Turkey: 83,600,000
- Sudan: 46,250,000
- Algeria: 43,330,000

Religions
- 87–90% Sunni Islam; 10–13% Shia Islam; ~1% Other Islamic traditions, including Ahmadiyya, Ibadism, Quranism, etc

Scriptures
- Quran; Prophetic traditions: Hadith

Languages
- Arabic (also Sacred), South Asian languages, African languages, Southeast Asian languages, Turkic languages, Iranian languages, and other Muslim world languages

Muslims (/ˈmʊslɪmz/, /ˈmʌzlɪmz/; Arabic: المسلمون, romanized: al-Muslimūn, lit. 'submitters [to God]') are people who are adherents of Islam, a monotheistic religion belonging to the Abrahamic tradition. They consider the Quran, the foundational religious text of Islam, to be the verbatim word of the God of Abraham (or Allah) as it was revealed to Muhammad, the last Islamic prophet. Alongside the Quran, Muslims also believe in finality of prophet as well as previous revelations, such as the Tawrat (Torah), the Zabur (Psalms), and the Injil (Gospel). These earlier revelations are associated with Judaism and Christianity, which are regarded by Muslims as earlier versions of Islam. The majority of Muslims also follow the teachings, traits and practices attributed to Muhammad (sunnah) as recorded in traditional accounts (hadith).

With an estimated population of 2 billion followers, Muslims comprise around 26% of total global population. In descending order, the percentage of people who identify as Muslims on each continental landmass stands at: 45% of Africa, 25% of Asia and Oceania collectively, 6% of Europe, and 1% of the Americas. Additionally, in subdivided geographical regions, the figure stands at: 91% of the Middle East–North Africa, 90% of Central Asia, 65% of the Caucasus, 42% of Southeast Asia, 32% of South Asia, and 42% of sub-Saharan Africa.

While there are several Islamic schools and branches, as well as non-denominational Muslims, the two largest denominations are Sunni Islam (87–90% of all Muslims) and Shia Islam (10–13% of all Muslims). By sheer numbers, South Asia accounts for the largest portion (31%) of the global Muslim population. By country, Indonesia is the largest in the Muslim world, holding around 12% of all Muslims worldwide; with Pakistan having the second-largest number of Muslims in the world after Indonesia. Outside the Muslim-majority countries, India and China are home to the largest (11%) and second-largest (2%) Muslim populations, respectively. Due to high Muslim population growth, Islam is the fastest-growing religion in the world. Muslims have experienced persecution of varying severity, especially in China, India, some parts of Africa, and Southeast Asia.

== Etymology ==
The word muslim (Note: Arabic: مسلم, IPA: [ˈmʊslɪm]; English: /ˈmʌzlɪm/, /ˈmʊzlɪm/, /ˈmʊslɪm/ MUZZ-lim, MUUZ-lim, MUUSS-lim) or moslem (Note: /ˈmɒzləm/, /ˈmɒsləm/ MOZ-ləm, MOSS-ləm) is the active participle of the same verb of which islām is a verbal noun, based on the triliteral Š-L-M "to be whole, intact". A female adherent is a muslima (مسلمة; also transliterated as muslimah). The plural form in Arabic is muslimūn (مسلمون) or muslimīn (مسلمين), and its feminine equivalent is muslimāt (مسلمات).

=== In English ===
The ordinary word in English is "Muslim". For most of the 20th century, the preferred spelling in English was "Moslem", but this has now fallen into disuse. That spelling and its pronunciation were opposed by many Muslims in English-speaking countries because the "s" was often pronounced with a z sound. This made the word more closely match the Arabic triliteral ẓ-l-m (ظ-ل-م), which has negative meanings and includes the Arabic word for "the oppressor". In the United States, the Associated Press (AP) instructed news outlets to switch to the spelling "Muslim" in 1991, making it the most common spelling thereafter. The last major newspaper in the United Kingdom to use the spelling "Moslem" was the Daily Mail, which switched to "Muslim" in 2004.

The word Mosalman, Mussulman, or Musulman (Persian: مسلمان, romanized: mosalmân, alternatively musalmān) is a common equivalent for Muslim used in Central and South Asia. In English it was sometimes spelled Mussulman and has become archaic in usage; however, cognates of this word remain the standard term for "Muslim" in various other European languages. Until at least the mid-1960s, many English-language writers used the term Mohammedans or Mahometans. Although such terms were not necessarily intended to be pejorative, Muslims argue that the terms are offensive because they allegedly imply that Muslims worship Muhammad rather than God. Other obsolete terms include Muslimite and Muslimist. In medieval Europe, Muslims were commonly called Saracens.

=== In Islam ===
The Muslim philologist Ibn al-Anbari said:

a Muslim is a person who has dedicated his worship exclusively to God, for just as we say in Arabic that something is ‘salima’ to a person, meaning that it became solely his own, so in the same way ‘Islām’ means making one's religion and faith God's alone.

In several places in the Quran, the word muslim conveys a universal meaning, beyond the description of the followers of Muhammad, for example:

"Abraham was neither a Jew, nor a Christian, but he was a true Muslim [مُسۡلِمࣰا], and he was not a polytheist." – Quran 3:67

"Then when Jesus perceived their disbelief he said, 'Who will be my helpers of God.' The disciples said 'We will be the helpers of God; we believe in God and bear witness that we are Muslims [مُسۡلِمُونَ].'" – Quran 3:52

Quranic studies scholar Mohsen Goudarzi has argued that in the Quran the word dīn means "worship", the islām means "monotheism" and the muslim means "monotheist".

Until the 8th century, the term muslim was more inclusive, including anyone who was considered to be submitting to God—e.g. Christians and Jews—and the term mu'min was instead used to refer to believers in Islam as a distinct religion.

== Qualifiers ==
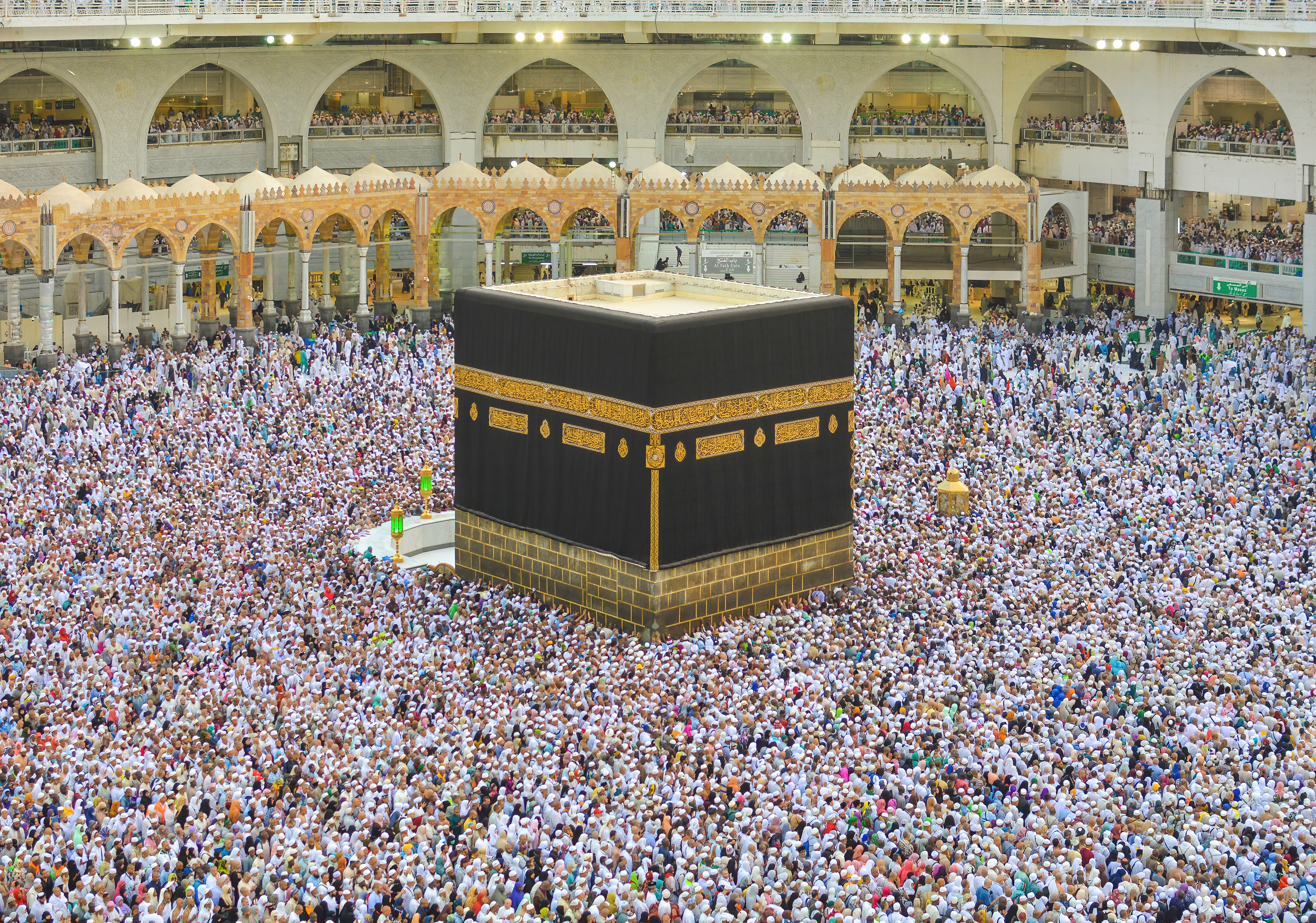
The Kaaba in Masjid al-Haram, Mecca, Saudi Arabia, during the Hajj season. Muslims face towards the Kaaba while performing Salah

To become a Muslim and to convert to Islam, it is essential to say the Shahada in front of Muslim witnesses, one of the Five Pillars of Islam, a declaration of faith and trust that professes that there is only one God (Allah) and that Muhammad is God's messenger. It is a set statement normally recited in Arabic: ašhadu ʾan-lā ʾilāha ʾillā-llāhu wa ʾašhadu ʾanna muħammadan rasūlu-llāh (أشهد أن لا إله إلا الله وأشهد أن محمداً رسول الله) "I testify that there is no god [worthy of worship] except Allah, and Muhammad is the messenger of Allah."

=== In Sunni Islam ===
In Sunni Islam, the shahada has two parts: la ilaha illa'llah (there is no god but Allah), and Muhammadun rasul Allah (Muhammad is the messenger of God), which are sometimes referred to as the first shahada and the second shahada. The first statement of the shahada is also known as the tahlīl.

=== In Shia Islam ===
In Shia Islam, the shahada also has a third part, a phrase concerning Ali, the first Shia Imam and the fourth Rashid caliph of Sunni Islam: وعليٌّ وليُّ الله (wa ʿalīyyun walīyyu-llāh), which translates to "Ali is the wali of God".

=== In Quranism ===
In Quranist Islam, the shahada is the testimony that there is no god but Allah (la ilaha illa'llah). Quranists believe adding Muhammad or other messengers in the declaration of faith contradicts the Quran and leads to idolization alongside God.

=== Five Pillars of Islam ===
The religious practices of Muslims are enumerated in the Five Pillars of Islam: the declaration of faith (shahadah), daily prayers (salah), almsgiving (zakat), fasting during the month of Ramadan (sawm), and the pilgrimage to Makkah (hajj) at least once in a lifetime.

== In Islamic theology ==
The majority of theological traditions of Islam accept that works do not determine if someone is a Muslim or not. God alone would know about the belief of a person. Fellow Muslims can only accept the personal declaration of faith. Only the Khawārij developed an understanding of Muslim identity based mainly on the adherence to liturgical and legal norms.

When asked about one's beliefs, it is recommended for one to say the Istit̲h̲nāʾ, for example, "in-sha'allah I am Muslim a believer" (so God will, I am Muslim), since only God knows the future of a person. Among Ash'arites, it is also seen as a sign of humility and the individual's longing to improve, because the creature has no assurance of their own state (of belief) until the end of life.

The Quran describes many prophets and messengers within Judaism and Christianity, and their respective followers, as Muslim. Some of those that were mentioned are: Adam, Noah, Abraham, Ishmael, Jacob, Moses, and Jesus and his apostles are all considered to be Muslims in the Quran. The Quran states that these men were Muslims because they submitted to God, preached His message and upheld His values, which included praying, charity, fasting and pilgrimage. Thus, in Surah 3:52 of the Qur'an, Jesus' disciples tell him: "We believe in God; and you be our witness that we are Muslims (wa-shahad be anna muslimūn)." In Islamic belief, before the Quran, God had given the Tawrat (Torah) to the prophets and messengers among the Children of Israel, the Zabur (Psalms) to David and the Injil (Gospel) to Jesus, who are all considered important Muslim prophets.

== Demographics ==
World map showing Muslims as a percentage of each country’s population, with bars for the number of Muslims, 2020

Muslim population by Region(2020)
Region	Muslim Population	% of the region is Muslim
Asia-Pacific	1,187,660,000	26.1
Middle East-North Africa	414,110,000	94.2
Sub-Saharan Africa	368,640,000	32.8
Europe	45,510,000	6.0
North America	5,910,000	1.6
Latin America–Caribbean	750,000	0.1
World	2,022,590,000	25.6

According to Pew estimates, as of 2020, Muslims made up about 25.6% of the global population, or roughly 2 billion people. The growth is mainly due to Muslims having a younger average age and higher birth rates—two key drivers of natural population increase. The most populous Muslim-majority country is Indonesia, home to 12.7% of the world's Muslims, followed by Pakistan (11.0%), Bangladesh (9.2%), Nigeria (5.3%) and Egypt (4.9%). About 20% of the world's Muslims live in the Middle East and North Africa. Non-majority India contains 10.9% of the world's Muslims. Arab Muslims form the largest ethnic group among Muslims in the world, followed by Bengalis, and Punjabis.

Over 87–90% of Muslims are Sunni. The second-largest sect, Shia, make up 10–13%, whereas other movements such as the Ahmadiyya, Quranism, Ibadism, collectively count for 1 per cent. While the majority of the population in the Middle East identify as either Sunni or Shia, a significant number of Muslims identify as non-denominational.

With about 2 billion followers (2025), over a quarter of earth's population, Islam is the second-largest and the fastest-growing religion in the world, primarily due to the young age and high fertility rate of Muslims, with Muslims having a rate of 3.1 compared to the world average of 2.5. According to the same study, religious switching has no impact on the Muslim population, since the number of people who embrace Islam and those who leave Islam are roughly equal. According to a 2020 Pew study, about 1% of adults raised Muslim leave the faith, while a similar share convert to Islam, resulting in low levels of religious switching both into and out of Islam.

As of 2010, 49 countries in the world had Muslim majorities, in which Muslims comprised more than 50% of the population. In 2010, 74.1% of the world's Muslim population lived in countries where Muslims are in the majority, while 25.9% of the world's Muslim population lived in countries where Muslims are in the minority. A Pew Center study in 2010 found that 3% of the world's Muslim population lives in non-Muslim-majority developed countries. India's Muslim population is the world's largest Muslim-minority population in the world (11% of the world's Muslim population). Followed by Ethiopia (28 million), China (22 million), Russia (16 million) and Tanzania (13 million). Sizeable minorities are also found in the Americas (5.2 million or 0.6%), Australia (714,000 or 1.9%) and parts of Europe (44 million or 6%). According to a 2020 Pew study, 79% of the world's Muslim population live in Muslim-majority countries, while 21% reside in countries where Muslims are a minority.

A Pew Center study in 2016 found that Muslims have the highest number of adherents under the age of 15 (34% of the total Muslim population) of any major religion, while only 7% are aged 60+ (the smallest percentage of any major religion). According to the same study, Muslims have the highest fertility rates (3.1) of any major religious group. The study also found that Muslims (tied with Hindus) have the lowest average levels of education with an average of 5.6 years of schooling, though both groups have made the largest gains in educational attainment in recent decades among major religions. About 36% of all Muslims have no formal schooling, and Muslims have the lowest average levels of higher education of any major religious group, with only 8% having graduate and post-graduate degrees.

== Culture ==
Muslim culture or Islamic culture are terms used to describe the cultural practices common to Muslims and historically Islamic people. The early forms of Muslim culture, from the Rashidun Caliphate to early Umayyad period, were predominantly Arab, Byzantine, Persian, and Levantine. With the rapid expansion of the Arab Islamic empires, Muslim culture has influenced and assimilated much from the Indonesian, Pakistani (Punjabi, Pashtun, Baloch Kashmiri, Sindhi), Hindustani, Bengali, Nigerian, Egyptian, Persian, Turkic, Caucasian, Malay, Somali, Berber, and Moro cultures.

== See also ==
- Cultural Muslims
- Historiography of early Islam
- Islamic schools and branches
- Islam by country
- Muslim attitudes toward terrorism
- Muslim world
- List of Muslims

== Sources ==
- Lang, Isabel (31 December 2015). Intertextualität als hermeneutischer Zugang zur Auslegung des Korans: Eine Betrachtung am Beispiel der Verwendung von Israiliyyat in der Rezeption der Davidserzählung in Sure 38: 21–25 (in German). Logos Verlag Berlin GmbH. ISBN 9783832541514.
- Talbot, Ian; Singh, Gurharpal (2009), The Partition of India, Cambridge University Press, ISBN 978-0-521-85661-4, archived from the original on 29 March 2024
