= PIEDAD =

- Propagación Islámica para la Educación y la Devoción a Aláh el Divino
- Formation: 1988
- Founder: Khadijah Rivera
- Founded at: Miami, FL
- Headquarters: New Jersey
- Official language: English, Spanish
- National Coordinator: Nylka Vargas
- Affiliations: LLAMO, LADO, LALMA, IslamInSpanish
- Website: PIEDAD website

In 1988 PIEDAD was founded by Khadijah Rivera in New York. In its acronym form, it reads "Propagación Islámica para la Educación y la Devoción a Aláh el Divino" (Islamic dawah to educate and worship Allah the Most High). Literally, PIEDAD means "Taqwa, piety or God-fearing." Their numerous seminars have included speakers like Imam Siraj Wahhaj, Mohammed Nasim, Dr. Thomas Irving, Dr. Omar Kasule, and others. PIEDAD began as the first Latina Muslim organization dedicated to Latina converts in the United States. Nylka Vargas became the PIEDAD National Coordinator after Khadijah Rivera's passing on November 22, 2009. Today, members consists of Latinas and non-Latinas. PIEDAD actively participates in local mosques and communities to collaborate, share information, and devise strategies to better all communities. Its five national chapters have more than 300 members.

== See also ==
- Latino Muslims
- African-American Muslims
- Islam in Africa
- African-American Muslims
- Islam in the United States
- Latin American Muslims
- Latino American Dawah Organization
