= Islam in Argentina =

Muslims in Argentina المسلمون في الأرجنتين Musulmanos argentinos
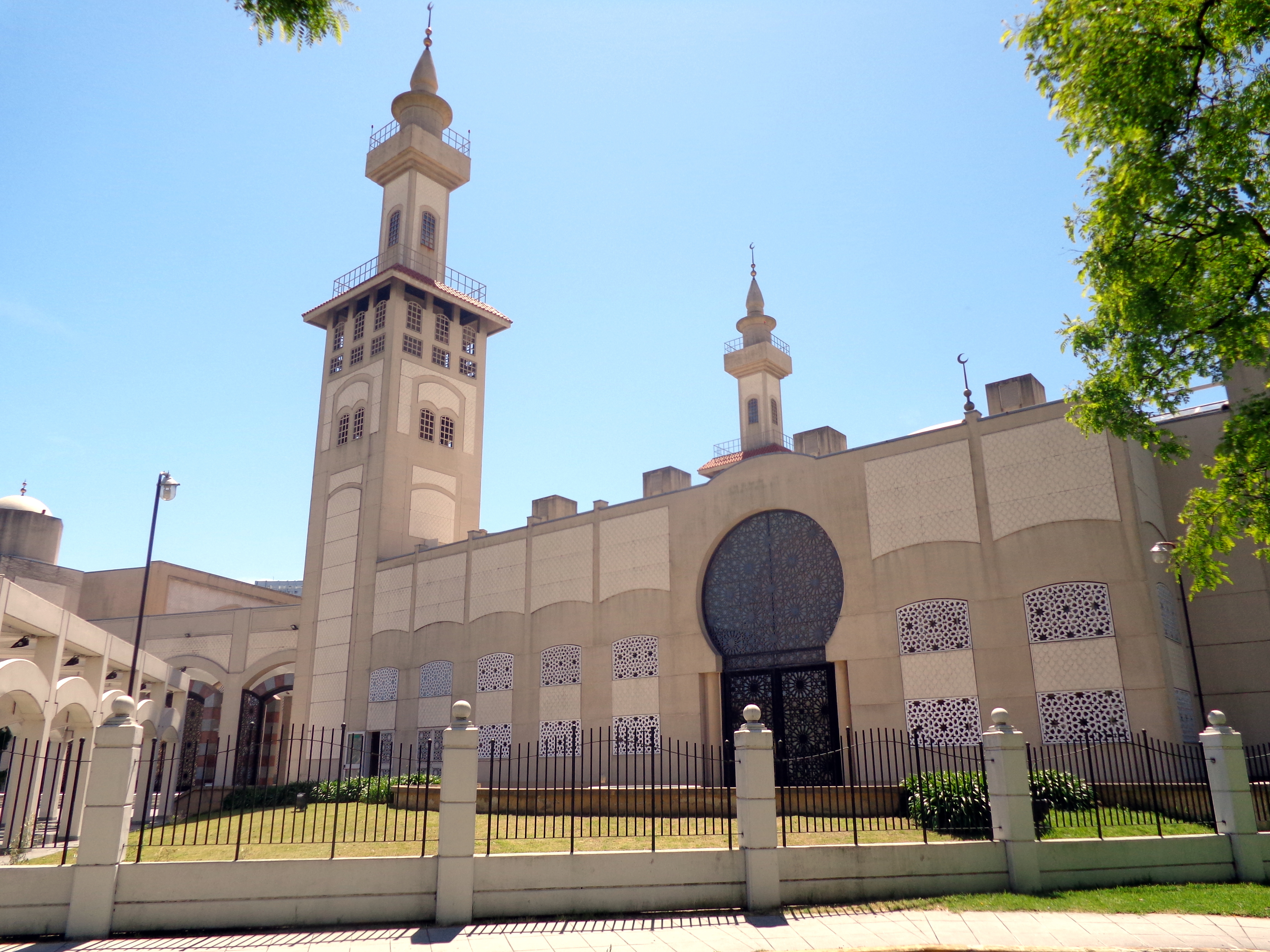
- King Fahd Islamic Cultural Center in Buenos Aires, the largest mosque in Argentina

Total population
- c. 400,000 to 500,000

Regions with significant populations
- Buenos Aires • Buenos Aires Province • Tucumán

Religions
- Islam

Languages
- Spanish • Arabic • Turkish • Wolof • Persian

Related ethnic groups
- Arabs in Argentina, Turks in Argentina, Senegalese in Argentina

Argentina is a predominantly Christian country, with Islam being a minority religion. Due to the secular nature of the Argentine constitution, Muslims are free to proselytize and build places of worship in the country.

Although accurate statistics on religion are not available (because the national census does not solicit religious data), the actual size of Argentina's Muslim community is estimated to be around 1% of the total population (400,000 to 500,000 members), according to the International Religious Freedom Report in 2015.

== Early Muslim immigration ==
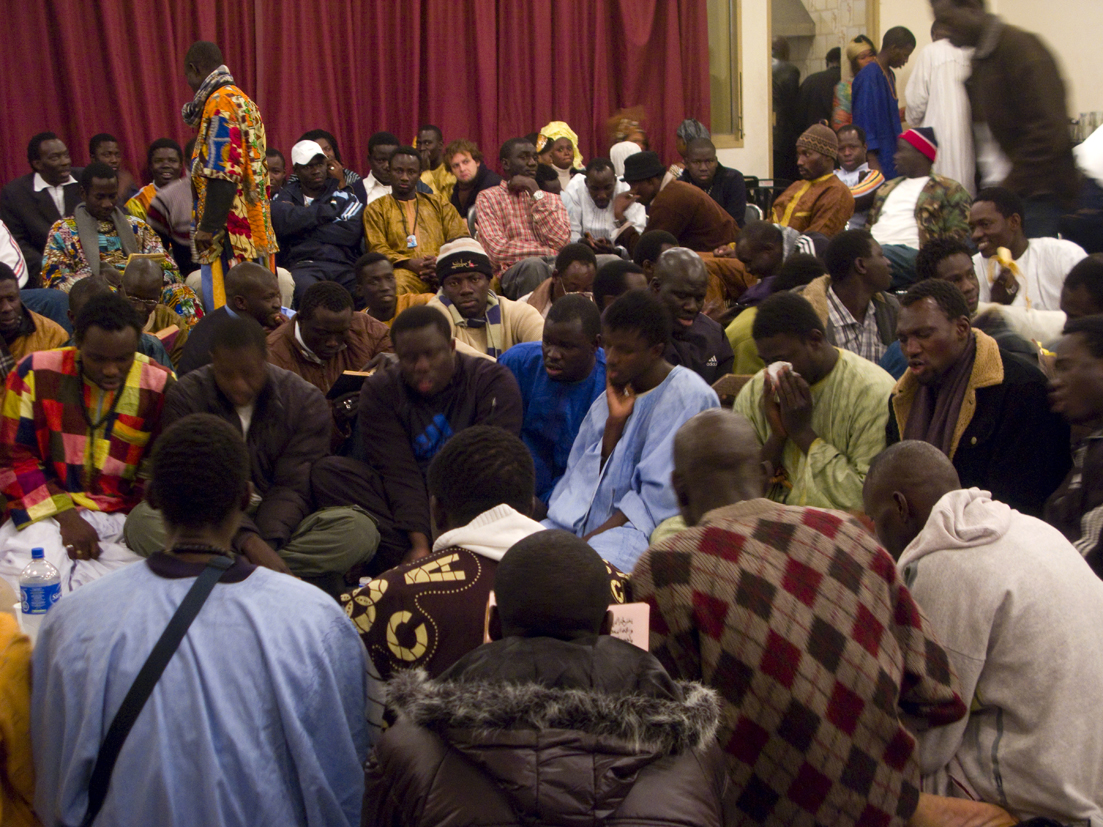
Senegalese immigrants at the King Fahd Islamic Cultural Center in Buenos Aires, Argentina.

There are some indications that the Muslim presence within present day Argentine territory dates back to the time of the Spanish exploration and conquest. The first mentioned Muslim settlers were the 15th century's Moorish-Morisco (Muslims of the Iberian peninsula of North African and Spanish descent) who explored the Americas with Spanish explorers, many of them settling in Argentina who were fleeing from persecution in Spain such as the Spanish Inquisition.

However, in the 19th century Argentina saw the first real wave of Arabs to settle within its territory, mostly from Syria and Lebanon. It is estimated that today there are about 3.5 million Argentines of Arab descent, most of whom are Arab Christians.

== Islamic institutions in Argentina ==
Muslims in Argentina (estimated)
Year	Population	% of Argentina
1990	444,000	1.4%
2010	1,000,000	▲2.5%
2030	1,233,000	▲2.6%
Source: Pew Research Center.

The first two mosques in the country were built in Buenos Aires in the 1980s: At-Tauhid Mosque was opened in 1983 by the Shia community of Buenos Aires and with the support of the Embassy of the Islamic Republic of Iran to Argentina, while Al Ahmad Mosque was opened in 1985 for Sunni Muslims and is the first building with Islamic architecture in the country. There are also several mosques in other cities and regions throughout the country, including two in Córdoba, two in Mar del Plata and the southernmost Sufi mosque in the world, in El Bolsón.

The King Fahd Islamic Cultural Centre, the largest mosque in Argentina, was completed in 1996 with the help of the Custodian of the Two Holy Mosques, the then King of Saudi Arabia, Fahd, on a piece of land measuring 20,000 m². The total land area granted by the Argentine government measures 34,000 m², and was offered by President Carlos Menem following his visit to Saudi Arabia in 1992. The project cost around US$30 million, and includes a mosque, library, two schools, a park, is located in the middle-class district of Palermo, Buenos Aires.

The Islamic Organization of Latin America (IOLA), headquartered in Argentina, is considered the most active organization in Latin America in promoting Islamic affiliated endeavors. The IOLA holds events to promote the unification of Muslims living in Latin America, as well as the propagation of Islam.

== Notable Muslims from Argentina ==
- Shaykh Isa Garcia - Isa Garcia was born in Buenos Aires, Argentina. He studied Arabic, Islamic studies, and theology at Umm Al-Qura University in Makkah. He is a specialist in the origins of Prophetic Tradition. Garcia has translated numerous books, with many only available to a Spanish-speaking readership in his translation. He is also the author of the series Know Islam. Garcia is listed as one of the top 500 Most Influential Muslims in the World.
- Sohail Asad (Edgardo Rubin) - an Argentinian of Lebanese descent who was born in Buenos Aires in 1970 and is now a philosopher and preacher of Shiite Islam.
- Lee Aaliya
- Carlos Menem Jr
- Eduardo Menem
- Abdul Karim Paz
- Soher El Sukaria
- Jorge Yoma
- Zulema Yoma

== See also ==
- Latin American Muslims
- Latino Muslims
- Arab Argentines
- Religion in Argentina
- List of mosques in Argentina
- Morisco
- Mudéjar
- Moors
