= Lalma =

Lalma may refer to:

- Lalma (Afghanistan), a village in Bamyan Province in central Afghanistan.

LALMA is also an acronym for:

- The La Asociacion Latino Musulmana de America, a Latino Muslim organization located in Los Angeles, California.
