= Islam in Nicaragua =

According to 2007 statistics released by the United States Department of State concerning Islam in Nicaragua, there are approximately 1,200 to 1,500 Muslims, mostly Sunnis who are resident aliens or naturalized citizens from Palestine, Libya, and Iran or natural-born Nicaraguan citizens born to both of the two groups. The Islamic Cultural Center in Managua serves as the primary salaat (prayer) center for Muslims in the city, with approximately 320 men attending on a regular basis. Muslims from Granada, Masaya, Leon, and Chinandega also travel to the Managua center for Friday prayers. Granada, Masaya, and Leon have smaller prayer centers in the homes of prominent local Muslims. In May 2007 the Sunni leader of the Managua prayer center was dismissed, due to the increase in Iranian influence in the Muslim community and was to be replaced by a Shi'a religious leader. By the end of the reporting period (May 2007) the Shi'a leader had not been identified.

== Background ==
=== Early Immigration ===
Muslim immigration occurred in moderate numbers in Nicaragua in the late 19th century. The majority were Palestinian Arab Muslims; the immigration constituted one of the largest waves of immigration to Central America. Although the exact number of Palestinians is not available, Guzmán writes "it is possible that from the end of the nineteenth century until 1917, when the Ottoman Empire entered its final decline, during World War I, 40 Palestinian families arrived in Nicaragua".

This early wave of immigrants quickly lost their Islamic roots and blended into the local population, often by adopting a Christian heritage due to intermarrying and government pressure. At different points during the 1890s to the 1940s Nicaragua, and many other Latin American countries, established laws or issued ordinances that restricted the entry of Arabs, forbade the stay of Arabs already present in the country and curtailed the expansion of their commercial activities.

=== Immigration: 1960s through 2000 ===
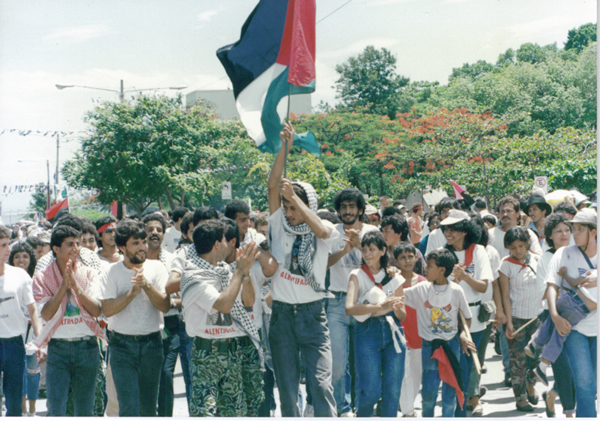
Palestinians celebrating the 10th anniversary of the Nicaraguan revolution in Managua waving Palestine and Sandinista flags.

The second group of immigrants in the 1960s was better educated, but not any more oriented towards Islam than the first. This group was affected by two major events in Nicaragua: the 1972 Nicaragua earthquake, and the Nicaraguan Revolution in 1979. At that time, many of the former Palestinians immigrated to North America or returned to Palestine. Those that stayed suffered greatly and their families were further assimilated into Christianity. The latest and smallest group of émigrés was in the early 1990s. Many of these were immigrants returning to Nicaragua who had since become more aware of their Muslim heritage from exposure in North America or Palestine. These immigrants also possessed a stronger Islamic identity than previous groups, enabling an Islamic reawakening by the community.

By 2000 it was estimated that there were 500 families of Palestine Arabs and Palestinian descendants in Nicaragua. The Palestinians that arrived in Nicaragua were mostly Christians and a small number of Muslims, the majority of which came from rural villages near Ramallah, Jerusalem, Beit Jala and Bethlehem. The total population of Palestinians in Nicaragua ranks as the largest Arab community in Central America.

=== Recent developments ===
According to Fahmi Hassan, President of the 'Asociación Cultural Nicaragüense-Islámica, the Muslim population consists primarily of Arabs who immigrated from Palestinian territories and Lebanon, in addition to a number of indigenous converts. In 1999, the first masjid (mosque) was constructed in the country on a parcel of land measuring three thousand meters in the San Juan district (Ciudad Jardin) with a capacity for nearly one thousand people. The masjid provides introductory courses on Islamic doctrine, as well as a place for performance of the congregational Friday prayer (Salaat al-Jummah) and Ramadan activities. Although the small Muslim community initially lacked finances, they were assisted by contributions from a delegation of Panamanian Muslims. Besides its characteristic minar, the liturgical office has a library, prayer room, administrative office, children's area, and a school. Religious seminars are offered for both men and women; Spanish language pamphlets are also distributed. Additionally, another new Islamic Center was recently inaugurated, called the Centro Cultural Islámico Nicaragüense. It is operated by a group of Shiite Muslims and their main goal is the propagation of Islamic teachings. Population of Shiite Muslims existed in Nicaragua from migration of Iranian refugees escaping Iranian Revolution of 1979 and escaping turmoil of Iran–Iraq War of the 1980s, the Iran–Nicaragua ties strengthened the influence of Shia Islam. Most Shi'ite Muslim Nicaraguans are of Iranian blood, they may still speak Persian and/or other Iranian language, aside from Arabic and Spanish. in the 2018 protests in Managua there was little identified participation by the Muslim community

== See also ==
- Latin American Muslims
- Latino Muslims
