= Marta Felicitas Galedary =

American non-profit executive and nurse

Marta Felicitas Ramirez de Galedary is a co-founder of the La Asociacion Latino Musulmana de America (LALMA) in 1999. LALMA is at the forefront of providing information and support to Latinos in Southern California. She is a former nursing director at the UMMA Clinic in Los Angeles. Galedary also works with LA Voice, and MuslimARC, (Muslim Anti-Racism Collaborative.) She is also a registered nurse.

== Biography ==
Marta Felicitas Ramirez was born into a ranching family in Guerrero, Mexico. She was the youngest of eleven daughters and was a student at a Catholic school. She attended the Colegio Hispano Americano in Mexico City, studying philosophy, art, psychology, and western literature. Galedary then married and had a son. She later took English lessons at a British Embassy institute before becoming an exchange student in Bath, England in 1981. There she first learned of Islam and befriended three of her Muslim classmates.

Galedary divorced her husband and moved to the United States through an exchange program. She says that she came to Islam through much soul-searching and study and embraced the religion in 1985. In September 1999, Galedary joined four other Muslim women at the Islamic Center of Southern California in Los Angeles to start a Latina Muslim study group and Spanish language library. She has been leading Spanish-language classes for new Muslim converts. She is also a khateebah at the Women's Mosque of America.

Her conversion story is featured in "Latino Muslims: Our Journeys to Islam."

== See also ==
- Latino Muslims
- Black Muslims
- Islam in the United States
- Latin American Muslims
- Latino American Dawah Organization
