= Jaime Fletcher =

Filmmaker

Jaime "Mujahid" Fletcher is a Colombian-American filmmaker and member of National Association of Latino Independent Producers (NALIP).

Fletcher was born in Colombia and moved to Houston, Texas at the age of 8, graduating in Multimedia and Film Honors at the Art Institute of Houston. A former Roman Catholic, Fletcher studied Christianity, Hinduism, Buddhism and Islam, and converted to the latter at a Muslim convention in Florida.

He is a youth advocate and founder of the Andalucia Media Arts Center. As a public speaker, he has covered topics about Latinos, youth, Islam, film and media at many institutions. Fletcher is the founder of IslamInSpanish, a non-profit organization dedicated to producing Spanish multimedia to "educate Latinos about Islam worldwide". He has worked as media analyst on Univision, Telemundo and CNN in Spanish, among others. He is the owner and CEO of an advertising agency, FocusPoint Studios.

== See also ==
- Latino Muslims
- Black Muslims
- Islam in the United States
- Latin American Muslims
