= San Pedro Sula Mosque =

Mosque in San Pedro Sula, Cortés, Honduras

Religion
- Affiliation: Islam

Location
- Municipality: San Pedro Sula
- State: Cortés
- Country: Honduras
- Interactive map of San Pedro Sula Mosque
- Coordinates: 15°29′25″N 88°01′56″W

Architecture
- Type: mosque
- Established: 2018
- Interior area: 250 square metres (2,700 ft^{2})

The San Pedro Sula Mosque, also known as the Islamic Centre of Honduras, is a Sunni mosque and cultural center located in San Pedro Sula, Cortés Department, Honduras. It is one of just two mosques in the country, the other being in Tegucigalpa.

== Overview ==
The mosque was inaugurated in 2018 and serves the Muslim community of San Pedro Sula and surrounding areas. Imam Mohammed, a Pakistani-born clergyman, leads the Friday prayers, which attract a modest weekly attendance of around 30 worshippers.

Covering an area of approximately 250 square metres (2,700 ft^{2}), the mosque was built in an Arabic architectural style and features two towers and a golden-colored dome. The interior is adorned with green carpeting and Quranic inscriptions in gold. The building's exterior is painted sky-blue and partially hidden behind palm trees, blending into its urban surroundings.

== See also ==
- Islam in Honduras
