= Inclán - Mezquita Al Ahmad (Buenos Aires Underground) =

Buenos Aires Underground station

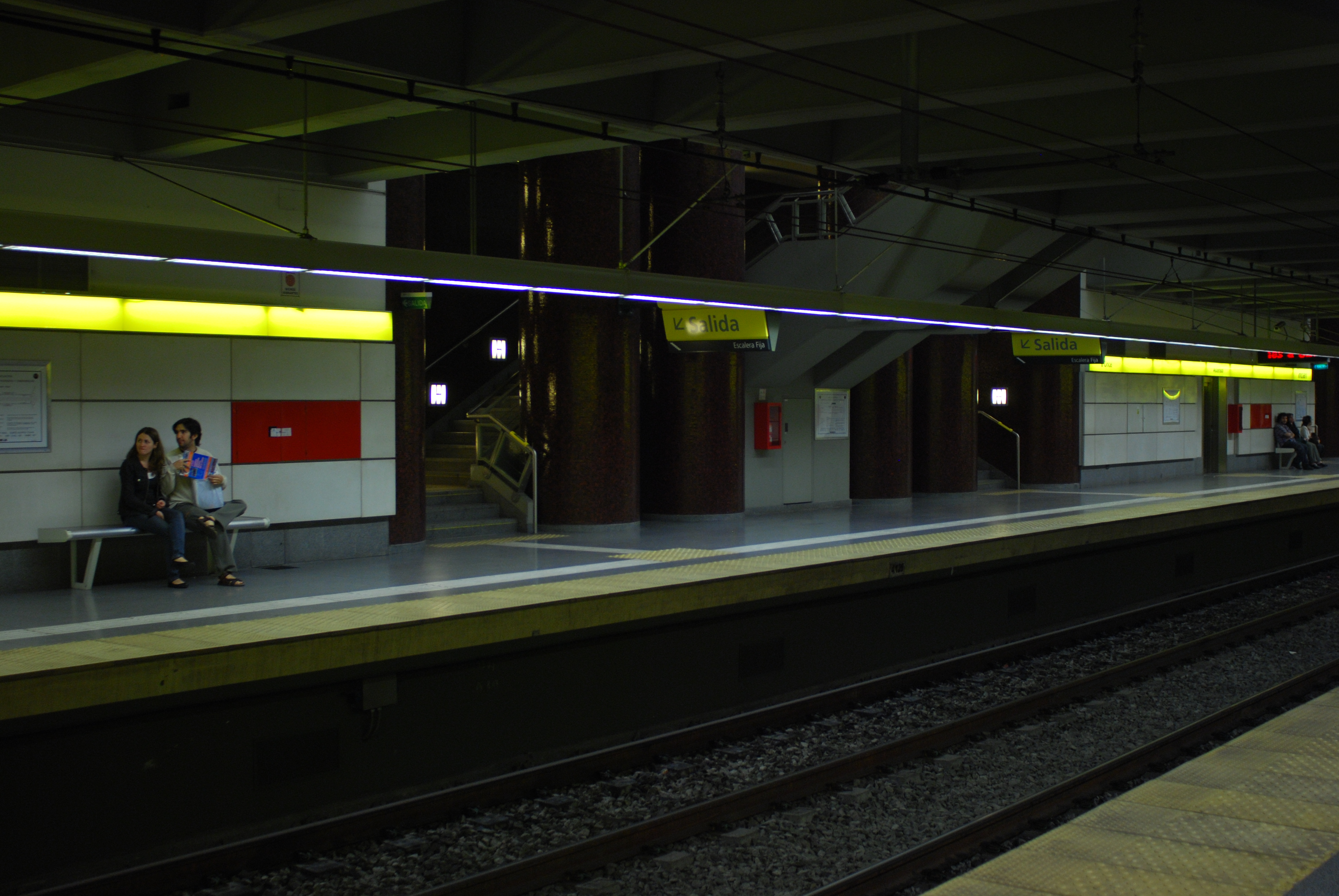

General information
- Location: Jujuy and Inclán
- Coordinates: 34°37′45.7″S 58°24′3.5″W
- Platforms: Side platforms

History
- Opened: 18 October 2007

Services
Preceding station	Buenos Aires Underground	Following station
Humberto I towards Facultad de Derecho	Line H	Caseros towards Hospitales
Location

Inclán - Mezquita Al Ahmad is a station on Line H of the Buenos Aires Underground. Here passengers may transfer to Metrobus Sur. The station was opened on 18 October 2007, as part of the inaugural section of the line, between Once - 30 de Diciembre and Caseros.

Originally named simply "Inclán" for Inclán Street, the station was renamed in 2016 to reference the nearby Al Ahmad Mosque.
