= Islam in Colombia =

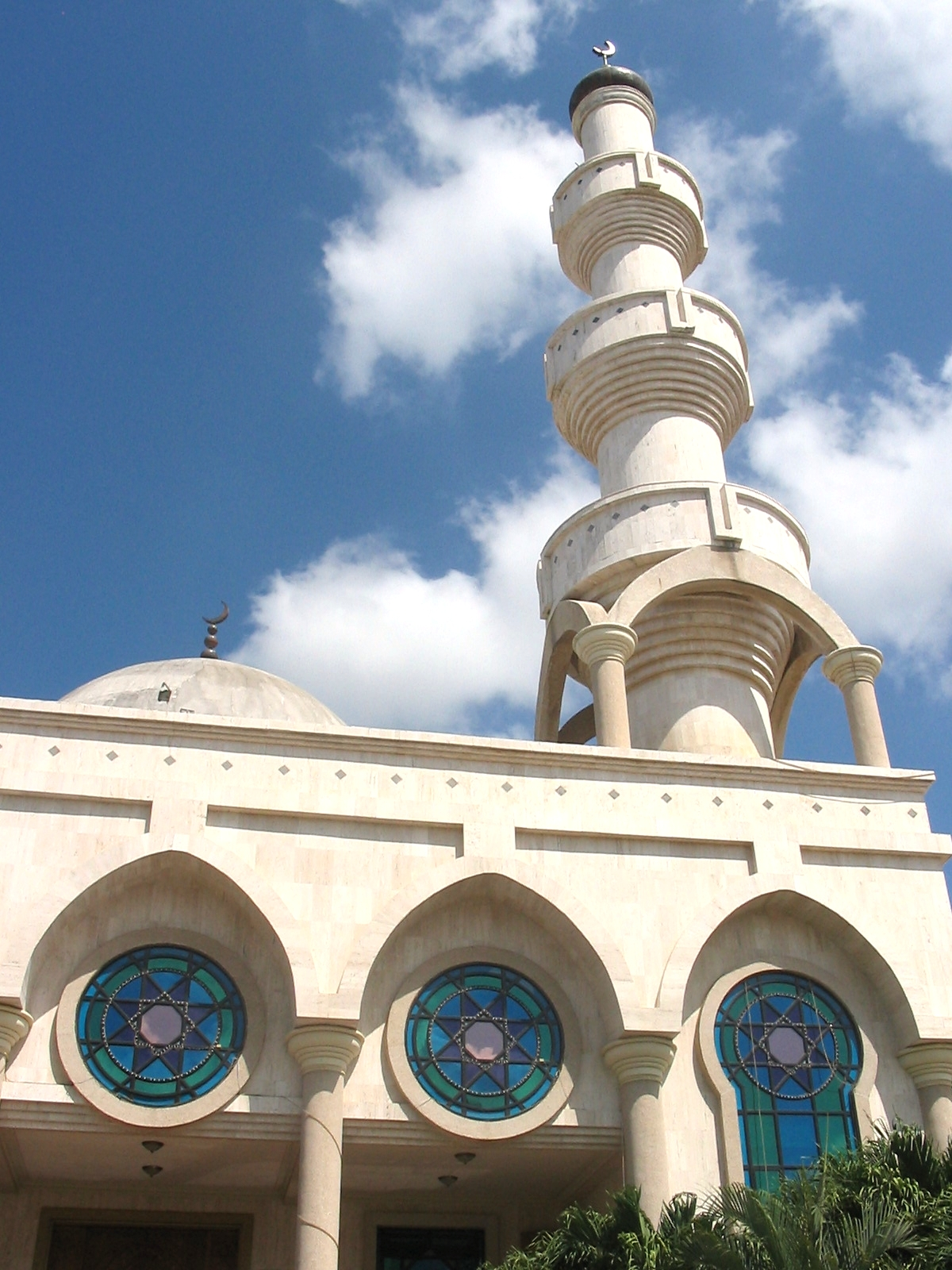
The Mosque of Umar in Maicao is the third-largest mosque in Latin America.

Islam in Colombia is a minority religion, with most Colombians adhering to Christianity (Roman Catholicism). According to a 2018 study conducted by Pew Research Center, the size of the Colombian Muslim population ranges from about 85,000–100,000 people out of a total population of 50.4 million. However, according to official estimates the Colombian Muslim community numbered just 10,000 people or 0.02% of the total Colombian population. Most Colombian Muslims are immigrants from the Arab World along with a small number of local converts.

There are a number of Islamic communities in Colombia, the most important of which, according to their size, are in Bogotá, Maicao and Buenaventura. There are also Islamic centers in San Andrés, Nariño Department, Santa Marta and Cartagena and primary as well as secondary Islamic schools in Bogotá and Maicao. Maicao plays host to the continent's third-largest mosque, the Mosque of Omar Ibn Al-Khattab. Muslims may have resided in Colombia for centuries. In 1620, a Catholic priest in Cartagena reported a community of slaves from Africa that shared same the religion (Islam) and communicated with each other using Arabic despite hailing from various origins. Most modern Muslims in Colombia are descendants of Arab immigrants from Syria, Lebanon, and Palestine during the late 19th to early 20th century. The Afro-Colombian Muslims in Buenaventura, Colombia's main Pacific port city, have over the years embraced the teachings of the Nation of Islam, mainstream Sunni Islam, and the Shia Islam denomination.

== Mosques ==
- Abou Bakr Al-Siddiq Mosque
- Mosque of Omar Ibn Al-Khattab

== See also ==
- Latin American Muslims
- Hispanic and Latino American Muslims
- Arab Colombians
- Lebanese Colombians
- Religion in Colombia
