= Jama Mosque, Panama City =

Mosque in Panama City, Panama

Jama Mosque
- Jama Mezquita
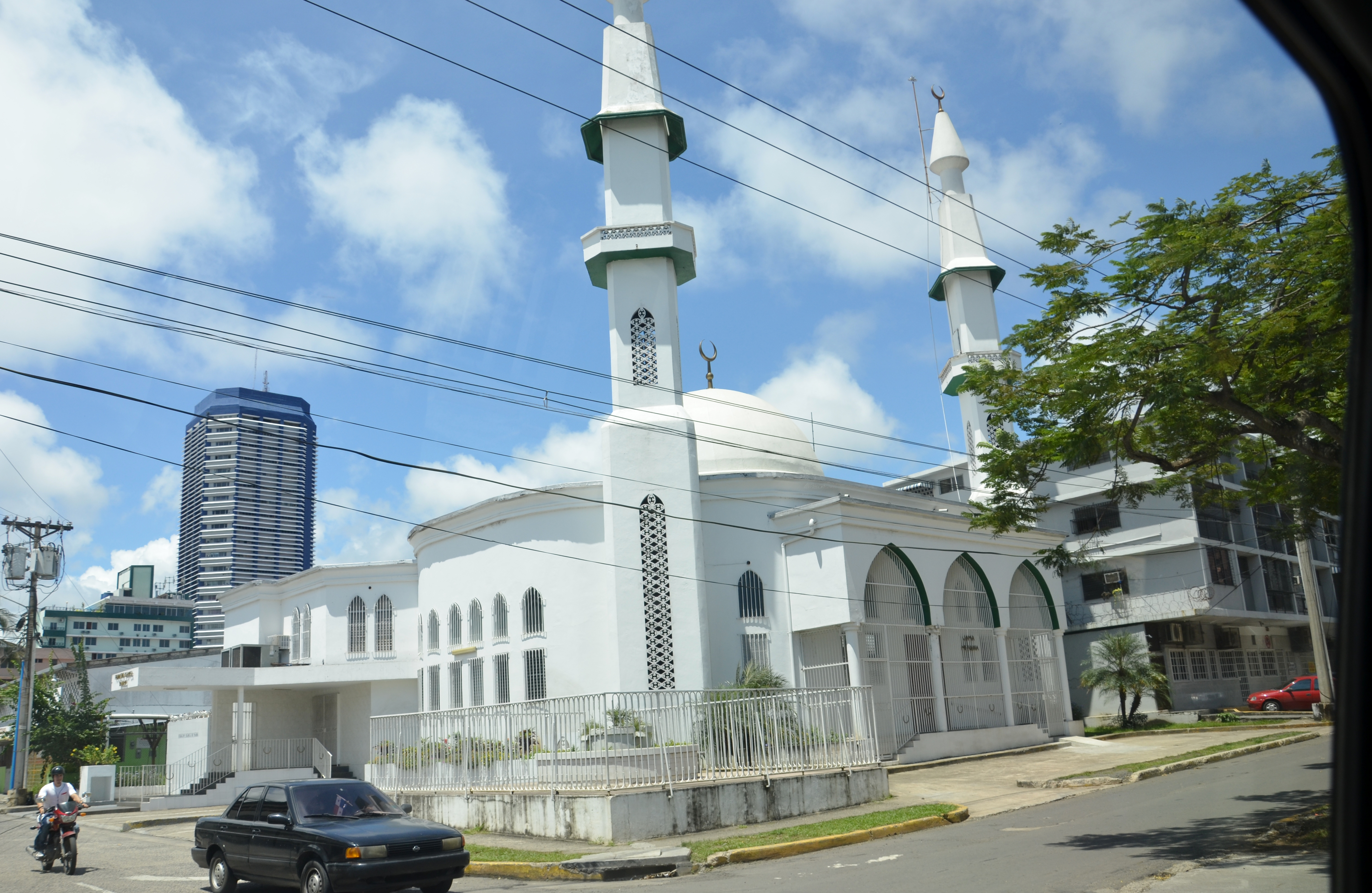

- Location of the mosque in Panamá Province

Religion
- Affiliation: Islam
- Ecclesiastical or organisational status: Mosque
- Status: Active

Location
- Location: Calle 30 Este, Ave. México, Panama City
- Country: Panama
- Interactive map of Jama Mosque
- Coordinates: 8°57′59.1″N 79°32′07.6″W

Architecture
- Type: Mosque
- Funded by: Suleman Bhiku, Libyan Embassy
- Established: 1982

Specifications
- Capacity: about 500 worshippers
- Minaret: 2
- Minaret height: 27 meters

Website
- https://islamenpanama.com

The Jama Mosque (Spanish: Jama Mezquita; Arabic: مسجد الجامع, romanized: Masjid al-Jāmiʿ, lit. 'Mosque of the Gathering') is a mosque located in Panama City, Panama.

== Overview ==
The mosque's construction started on 8 August 1980, and was established on 15 January 1982. It is the oldest mosque in the country and in all of Central America. The mosque's creation was funded by Suleman Bhiku and the Libyan Embassy in Panama. This led to the foundation of Fundación Islamica de Panamá (English: Islamic Foundation of Panama).

The mosque has 2 27-meter high minarets and can accommodate about 500 worshippers. The time for Jumu'ah is at 1:00 pm.

== See also ==
- Lists of mosques in North America
- Islam in Panama
