= At-Tauhid Mosque =

Mosque in Floresta, Buenos Aires, Argentina

- Spanish: Mezquita At-Tauhid
- Location of the mosque in Buenos Aires

Religion
- Affiliation: Shia Islam
- Ecclesiastical or organizational status: Mosque
- Status: Active

Location
- Location: Felipe Vallese St. 3614, Floresta, Buenos Aires
- Country: Argentina
- Interactive map of At-Tauhid Mosque
- Coordinates: 34°37′31.8″S 58°28′53.7″W

Architecture
- Type: Mosque architecture
- Style: Islamic
- Completed: 1983

Website
- organizacionislam.org.ar (in Spanish)

The At-Tauhid Mosque (Spanish: Mezquita At-Tauhid) is a Shia Islam mosque, located in the Floresta neighbourhood of Buenos Aires, Argentina. Inaugurated in October 1983, it is the oldest mosque in the country, and was established with the support of the Embassy of the Islamic Republic of Iran to Argentina. It is a simple building with a subtle Islamic style in its façade.

The mosque is located on Felipe Vallese St. 3614.

== See also ==
- Islam in Argentina
- List of mosques in Argentina
