= Al Ahmad Mosque =

Mosque in Buenos Aires, Argentina

- Spanish: Mezquita Al Ahmad
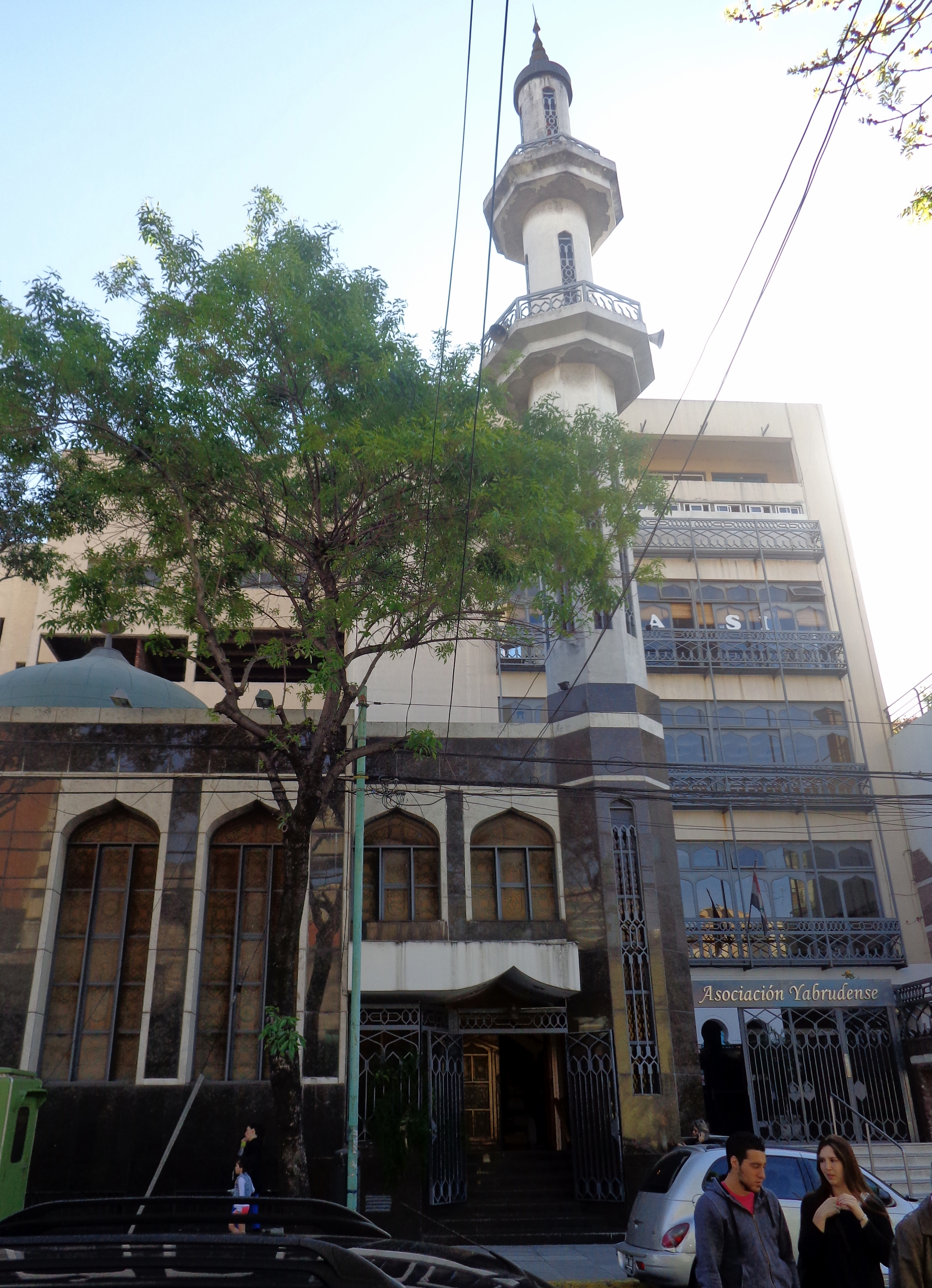
- The mosque in 2016

- Location of the mosque in Buenos Aires

Religion
- Affiliation: Sunni Islam
- Ecclesiastical or organizational status: Mosque
- Governing body: Islamic Center of Argentina (CIRA)
- Status: Active

Location
- Location: Calle Alberti, 1541, San Cristobal, Buenos Aires
- Country: Argentina
- Interactive map of Al Ahmad Mosque
- Coordinates: 34°37′40″S 58°24′01″W

Architecture
- Architects: Ahmed and Elia Ham
- Type: Mosque architecture
- Style: Islamic
- Groundbreaking: 1985
- Completed: 1986

Specifications
- Dome: One
- Minaret: One

Website
- islam.com.ar (in Spanish)

The Al Ahmad Mosque (Spanish: Mezquita Al Ahmad) is a Sunni Islam mosque, located in Buenos Aires, Argentina.

== Overview ==
Designed by Ahmed and Elia Ham, the mosque opened in 1986. It is the second oldest mosque in Buenos Aires and it is the oldest building in Argentina, completed in the Islamic style.

It is located on Alberti St. 1541, San Cristobal neighbourhood. It has a minaret from which the muezzin issues the call for the five daily prays, the dome over the prayer hall also highlights. The mosque is part of the Islamic Center of Argentina. The Al Ahmad Mosque accommodates a large number of Muslims on Fridays at noon for Jummah, the most important Muslim prayer of the week and to hear the sermon delivered by the Imam.

The nearby Inclán - Mezquita Al Ahmad station of Line H of the Buenos Aires Underground draws its name from the mosque.

== See also ==
- Islam in Argentina
- List of mosques in Argentina
