= Caseros (Buenos Aires Underground) =

Buenos Aires Underground station

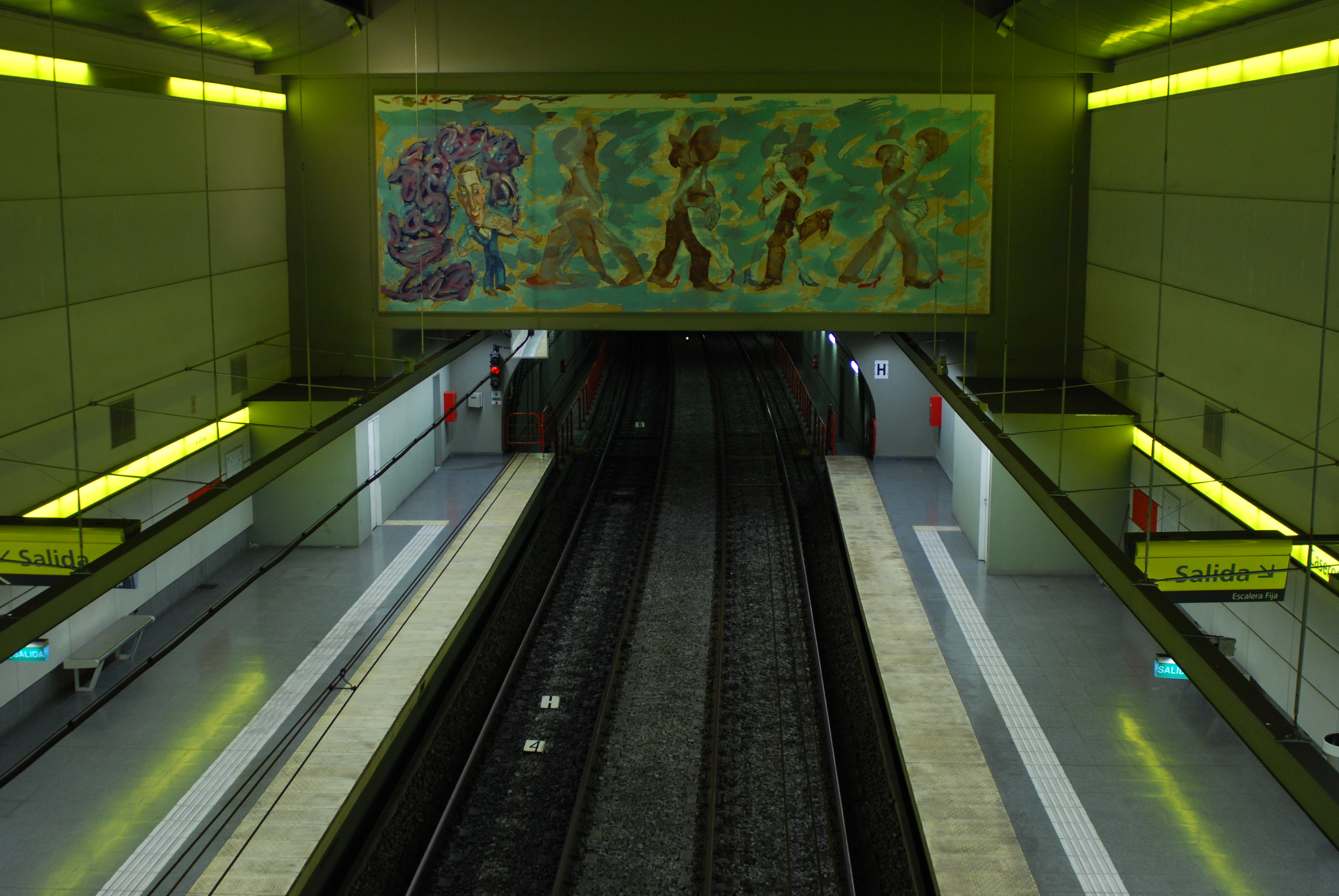

General information
- Location: Jujuy and Caseros
- Coordinates: 34°38′9″S 58°23′56.1″W
- Platforms: Side platforms

History
- Opened: 18 October 2007

Services
Preceding station	Buenos Aires Underground	Following station
Inclán towards Facultad de Derecho	Line H	Parque Patricios towards Hospitales
Location

Caseros Station is a station on Line H of the Buenos Aires Underground. The station was opened on 18 October 2007, as the southern terminus of the inaugural section of the line, between Once - 30 de Diciembre and Caseros. It remained the line's southern terminus until the opening of Parque Patricios Station on 4 October 2011.
