= LALMA =

Not-for-profit organisation established in 1999

- La Asociacion Latino Musulmana de America
- Formation: September 1999
- Founded at: Los Angeles, California
- Type: NGO
- Legal status: Non-profit organization
- Purpose: Promoting understanding of Islam among Latino Muslims
- Official language: Spanish
- President: Marta Felicitas Galedary
- Website: lalma.net
- Formerly called: Los Angeles Latino Muslims Association

LALMA is a not-for-profit organization that was established in 1999 in response to the need for Spanish-language resources on Islam. Initially, LALMA stood for Los Angeles Latino Muslims Association, but after a restructuring to accommodate its growth, LALMA was renamed to La Asociacion Latino Musulmana de America.

LALMA began with a group of five Latino Muslims from Los Angeles led by Marta Felicitas Galedary began having regular meetings to learn about Islam in the Spanish language. The Spanish-speaking Islamic study group first met at the Islamic Center of Southern California.

Each Sunday morning, LALMA members gather to attend Arabic lessons, receive instruction on the Quran and the biography of Muhammad (sirah), and discuss issues of interest to Muslim converts. They regularly have guest lectures on different aspects of Islam, meeting at various mosques in Southern California. They also provide CPR courses, first aid, and community safety courses as well as teen counseling and support to Latino dawah programs. LALMA sponsors events such as conferences on the Islamic roots of Spain and yearly activities during Ramadan.

== See also ==
- Alianza Islámica
- Black Muslims
- Islam in the United States
- Latin American Muslims
- Hispanic and Latino American Muslims
- Latino American Dawah Organization
