= Mezquita del Este =

Mosque and Islamic cultural center in Ciudad del Este, Paraguay

- Mezquita Alkhaulafa Al-Rashdeen
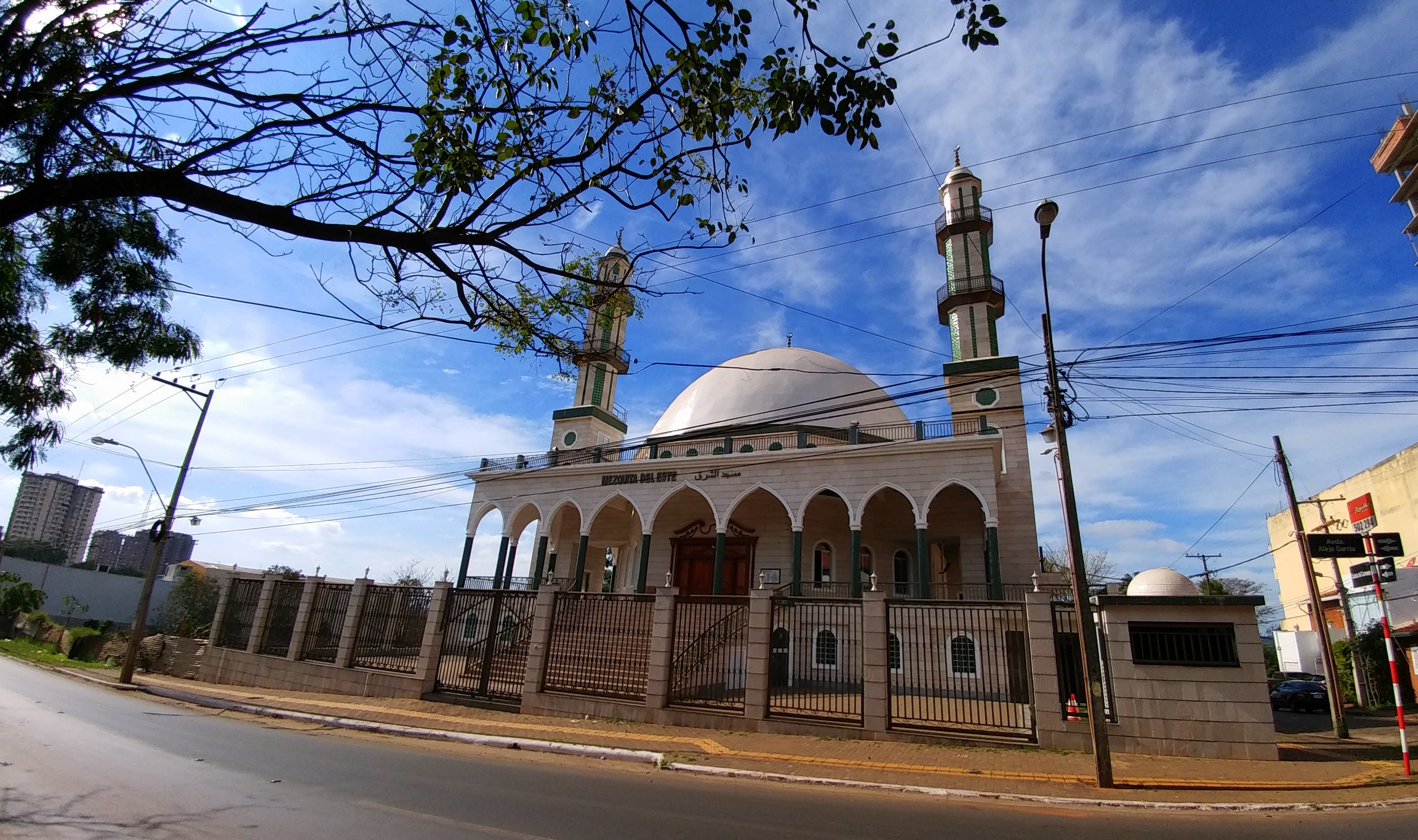

- Location in Paraguay

Religion
- Affiliation: Islam
- Ecclesiastical or organizational status: Mosque
- Status: Active

Location
- Location: Ciudad del Este, Alto Paraná,
- Country: Paraguay
- Interactive map of Mezquita del Este
- Administration: Comunidad Árabe Islámica del Paraguay
- Coordinates: 25°31′20″S 54°36′37″W

Architecture
- Architect: Héctor Duré (engineer)
- Type: Mosque
- Style: Islamic architecture
- Groundbreaking: April 2011
- Completed: November 2015
- Construction cost: US$1 million

Specifications
- Capacity: c. 650 worshippers
- Dome: 1
- Dome height (outer): 20 m (66 ft)
- Minaret: 2
- Minaret height: 35 m (115 ft)
- Site area: 3,500 m^{2} (38,000 sq ft)

The Mezquita del Este (Spanish: Mezquita Alkhaulafa Al-Rashdeen; Arabic: مسجد الخلفاء الراشدين, romanized: Masjid al-Khulafā al-Rāshidīn), is a mosque and Islamic cultural center located in Ciudad del Este, Paraguay. It serves as both a house of worship and a cultural hub for the Muslim community in the Triple Frontier region.

== History ==
Construction of the mosque began in April 2011, led by engineer Héctor Duré, funded entirely by the local Arab-Islamic community, of approximately 7,000 members in Ciudad del Este and about 20,000 across the Triple Frontier.

After roughly four years of construction, the mosque was inaugurated on 3 November 2015 by Paraguay’s president Horacio Cartes, with attendance by Arab diplomats.

== Architecture ==
The mosque showcases traditional Islamic architectural features-including a prominent dome constructed from reinforced concrete—and two towering 35-metre (115 ft) minarets, one with an elevator, the other with a staircase, connecting all four levels.

The subsurface level serves as a car park for up to 45 vehicles. The interior uses materials imported from Saudi Arabia and China, contrasting with locally sourced structural work and Paraguayan craftsmanship.

It includes gender-specific prayer areas: a main hall for men (450–500 worshippers) and a mezzanine for women (approx. 150 worshippers).

== Gallery ==
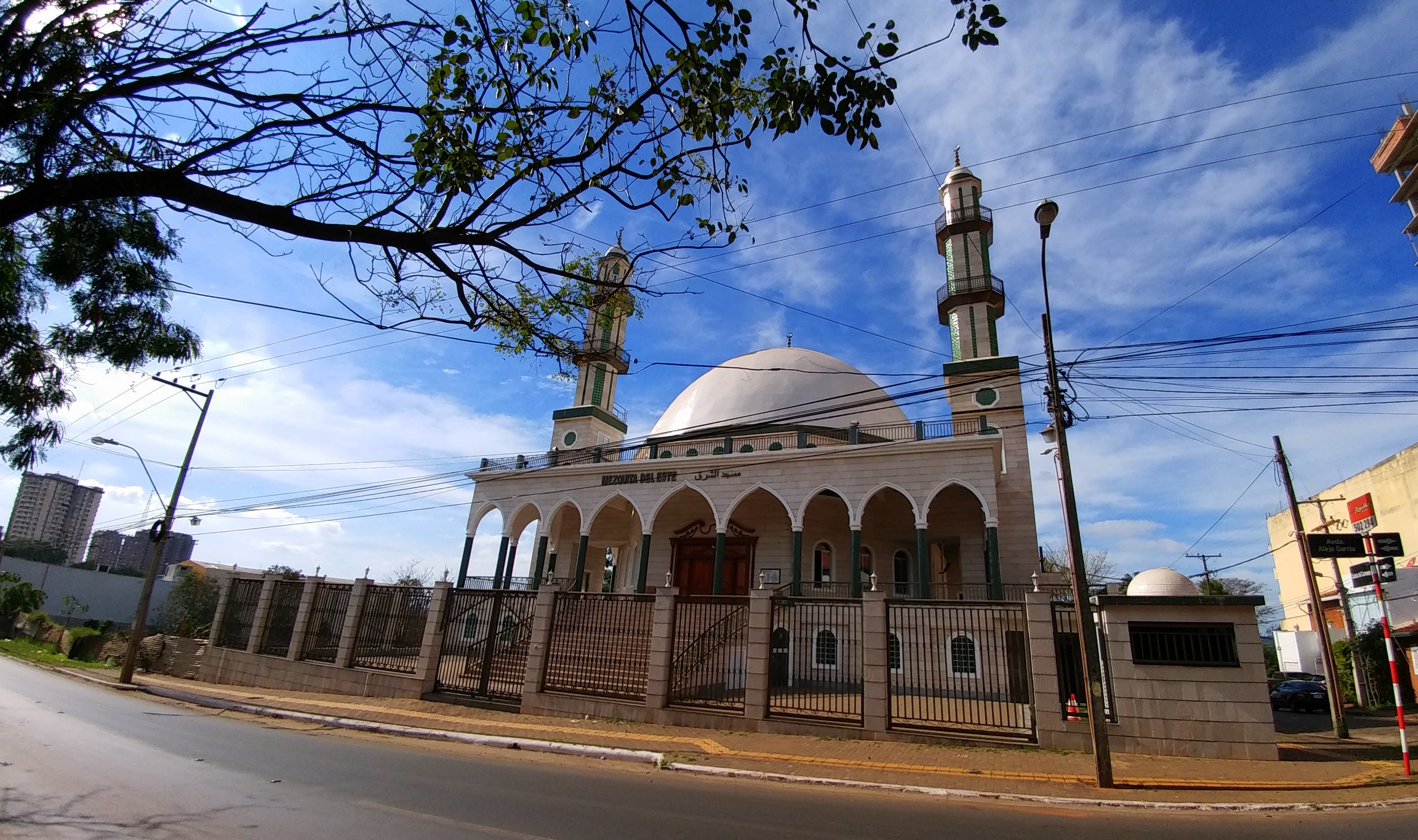
View of the mosque’s façade

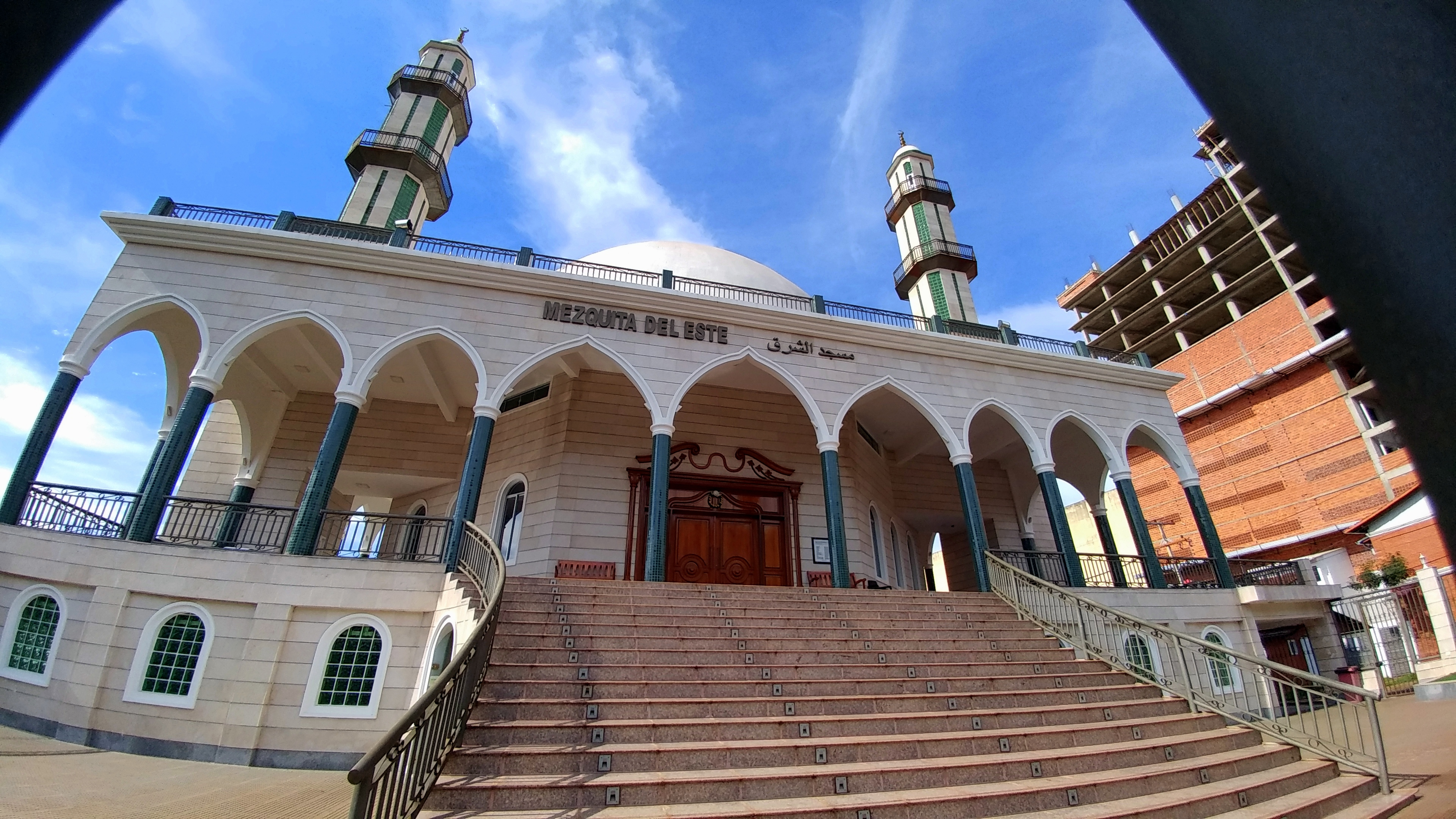
Approach with dome and minaret

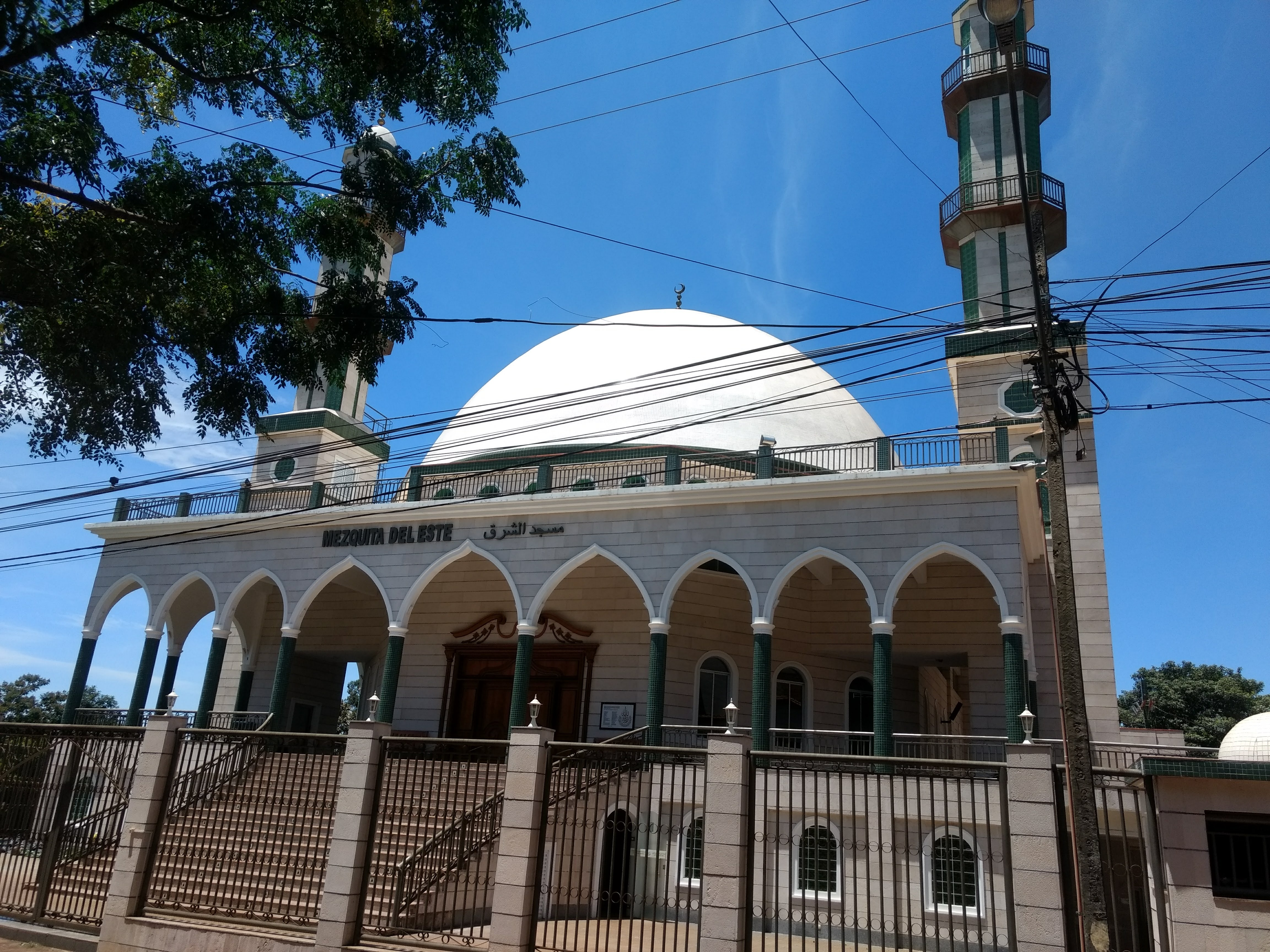
Another exterior angle showing dome and towers

== See also ==
- Islam in Paraguay
- List of mosques in Paraguay
