= Mosque of Omar Ibn Al-Khattab =

Mosque in Maicao, Columbia

- Mezquita de Omar Ibn Al-Jattab
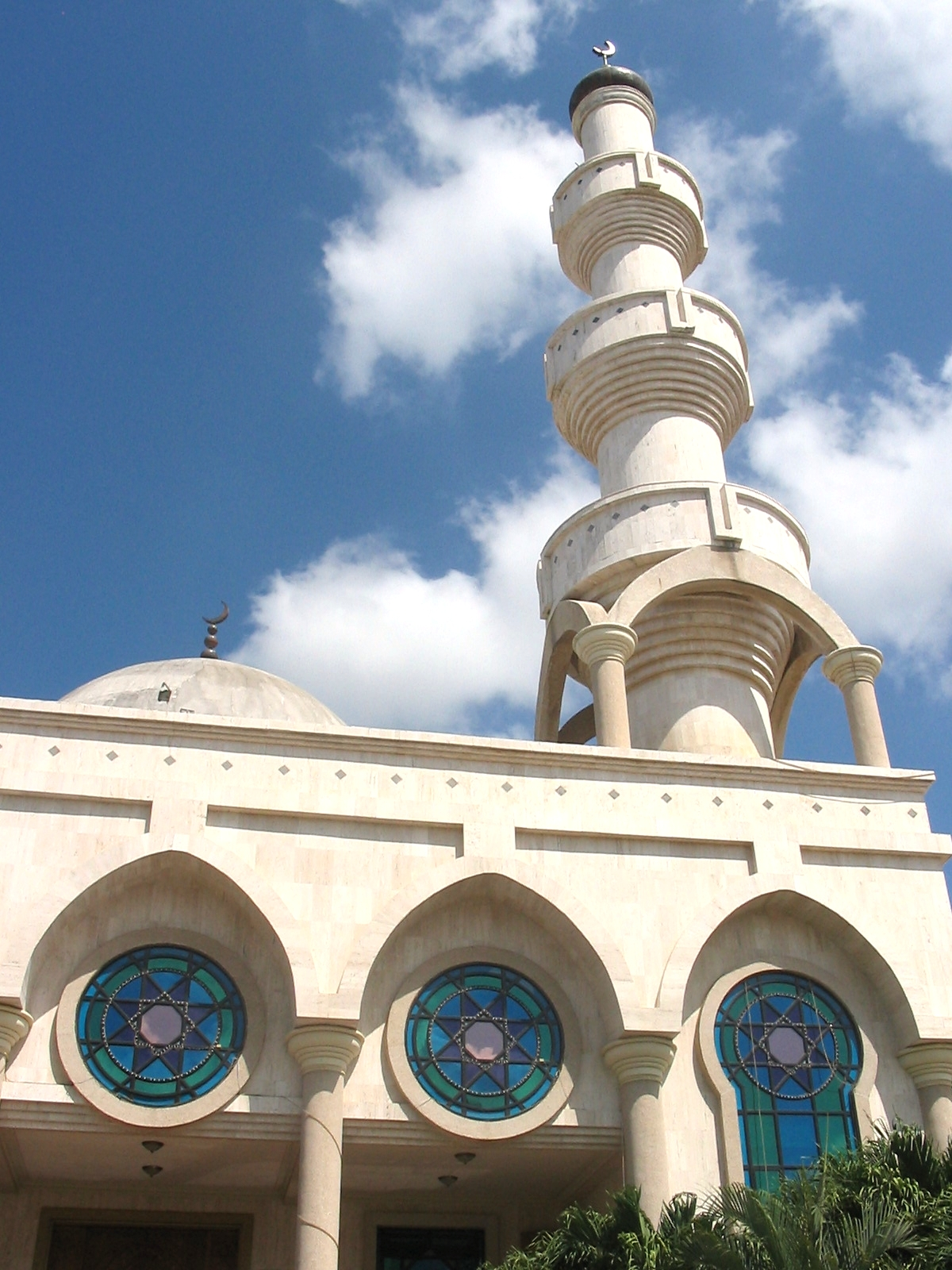

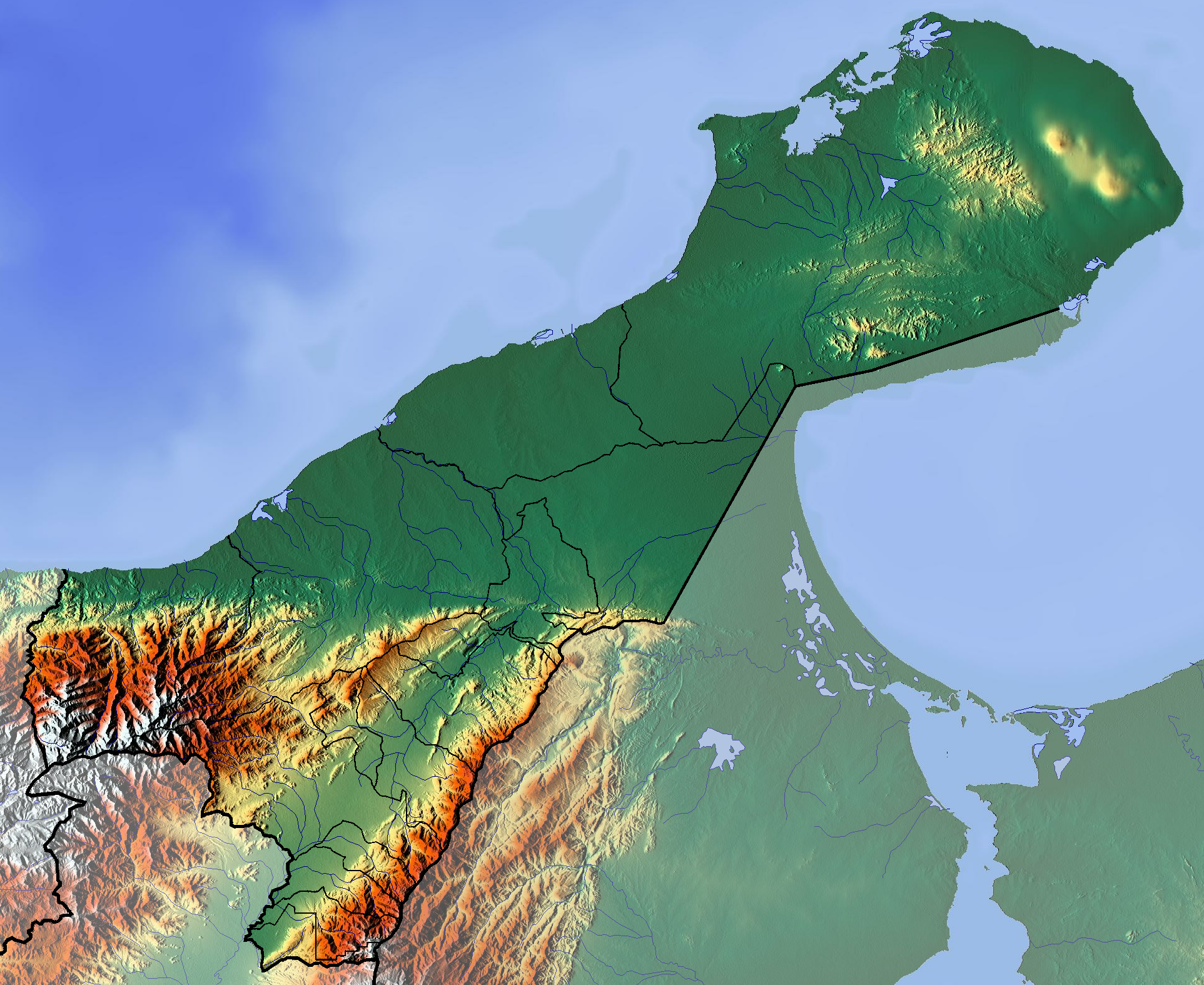
- Location within La Guajira Department

Religion
- Affiliation: Islam
- Ecclesiastical or organizational status: Mosque
- Status: Active

Location
- Location: Maicao, La Guajira
- Country: Colombia
- Interactive map of Mosque of Omar Ibn Al-Khattab
- Coordinates: 11°22′41″N 72°14′03″W

Architecture
- Architect: Ali Namazi
- Type: Mosque
- Completed: 1997

Specifications
- Capacity: 1,000 worshipers
- Dome: 1
- Minaret: 1
- Minaret height: 37 m (121 ft)
- Materials: Marble

The Mosque of Omar Ibn Al-Khattab (Spanish: Mezquita de Omar Ibn Al-Jattab) is a mosque in Maicao, La Guajira, Colombia. It is the third largest mosque in Latin America. It is locally known as "La Mezquita" ("The Mosque"), simply because it is the only mosque in the region. Along with the Dar Alarkan School, they are the centers for the Islamic faith and culture in the region.

== Overview ==
The mosque was completed on 17 September 1997, and named after the second caliph Omar Ibn Al-Khattab. It was designed by the Iranian architect Ali Namazi and built by the civil engineer Oswaldo Vizcaino Fontalvo who used Italian marble for its construction. It can easily accommodate over 1,000 people.

At the entrance there is a large open hall decorated with framed Arabic inscriptions. Further on, there is another hall, larger than the first, used by men for prayer. This is also where they meet in order to end periods of fasting. The ceiling of this room has decorative engravings. Facing Mecca, there is a place for the women to pray, elevated and overlooking the men's hall. The 37-metre-high (121 ft) minaret dominates the upper parts of the structure.

Below the great stairs exiting the mosque, there is a room for undertaking of the deceased before their remains are taken to the local Muslim cemetery.

== See also ==
- Islam in Colombia
- List of mosques in the Americas
