= Soher El Sukaria =

Argentine politician

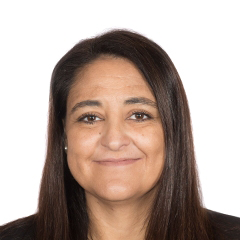

National Deputy
- In office 10 December 2019 – 10 December 2023
- Constituency: Córdoba

Provincial Legislator of Córdoba
- In office 10 December 2015 – 10 December 2019

Personal details
- Born: 16 May 1975 (age 51) Jdeide, Lebanon
- Party: Republican Proposal (since 2013)
- Other political affiliations: Juntos por el Cambio (2015–present)
- Education: National University of Córdoba

Soher El Sukaria (born 16 May 1975) is a Lebanese-born Argentine politician. She was a member of the Argentine Chamber of Deputies elected in Córdoba Province from 2019 to 2023. A member of Republican Proposal, El Sukaria previously served as a member of the Córdoba Provincial Legislature from 2015 to 2019.

A practicing Muslim, El Sukaria is the first Muslim woman elected to the Argentine Congress. Since 2023, she has been a councilwoman in the city of Córdoba.

== Early life and education ==
El Sukaria was born on 16 May 1975 in Jdeide, a small village in northeastern Lebanon. Her mother, Rosa, is Argentine of Arab descent, while her father, Mounif, was a prominent Sunni imam in Córdoba until his death in 2002. Her parents met during a trip to Lebanon and married there; Soher was born shortly thereafter. The family moved back to Argentina when Soher was a month old, settling in Córdoba.

El Sukaria studied law at the National University of Córdoba and attained a master's degree on International Relations from the same university. She also has a master's degree on International Relations from the International University of Andalusia.

== Political career ==
At the 2015 general election, El Sukaria was a candidate in the Juntos por Córdoba list to the Córdoba Provincial Legislature; she was elected. She was later appointed president of the City of Córdoba chapter of the Republican Proposal.

El Sukaria was the second candidate in the Córdoba Province Juntos por el Cambio list to the Argentine Chamber of Deputies in the 2019 general election, behind Mario Negri; the list was the most voted in the province, and El Sukaria was elected. Upon being elected, El Sukaria became the first Muslim woman elected to the National Congress of Argentina – a number of Muslim men, most prominently Eduardo Menem, had previously served in both houses of Congress before.

== Electoral history ==
Electoral history of Soher El Sukaria
Election	Office	List	#	District	Votes			Result	Ref.
Election	Office	List	#	District	Total	%	P.	Result	Ref.
2015	Provincial Legislator	Together for Córdoba	—N/a	Provincial List	532,322	32.72%	2nd (Note: Presented on an electoral list. The data shown represents the share of the vote the entire party/alliance received in that constituency.)	Elected	
2019	National Deputy	Juntos por el Cambio	2	Córdoba Province	1,140,338	51.32%	1st	Elected	
