= Islam in Honduras =

Honduras is a predominantly Christian country, with Islam being a small minority religion. Due to secular nature of the country's constitution, Muslims are free to proselytize and build places of worship in the country. The statistics for Islam in Honduras estimate a total Muslim population of 11,000 representing 0.1 percent of the population.

Although there are no official statistics, it is estimated that more than 300,000 of the country's ten million inhabitants are of Arab descent, and of these, the great majority are Palestinian and Lebanese Arabs. However, the vast majority of these Arabs are of Orthodox and Catholic Christian descent. No other country in the Western Hemisphere has a higher proportion of Arab immigrants and, in absolute numbers, Honduras ranks seventh after the United States, Mexico, Colombia, Venezuela, Canada and Chile. There are two known Islamic organizations in Honduras, including the Centro Islámico de Honduras at the San Pedro Sula Mosque in San Pedro Sula led by Yusuf Amdani, and the Comunidad Islámica de Honduras in Cortés.

== Background ==
Honduras received its first Arab immigrant in 1896, and by 1918, according to a local survey, Arab immigrants were largely Palestinian Christians in San Pedro Sula, the country's second-largest city. They immigrated due to the Ottoman control of Palestine, where Arabs fled with Ottoman passports gaining their commonly known nickname, Turkish (Turcos). Immigration picked up again after World War II and the Arab-Israeli war of 1948. In 1984, an Islamic charitable organization was founded, with the main object of taking care of the interests of the Arabs and Muslims in the country, and they have since built a mosque, where they meet and discuss their social and religious affairs, including the education of their children, the most important of which is teaching them the Qur’an and the Arabic language.

== See also ==
- Latin American Muslims
- Latino Muslims
- Islam in the Americas
