= Latin American Muslims =

Muslims from countries in Latin America

Total population
- No reliable data for the total population

Regions with significant populations
- Latin America, Spain, United States

Languages
- American English, Spanish, Portuguese, Spanish Creole, Portuguese Creole, Amerindian, Basque, Catalan, Galician, Arabic

Religion
- Islam (majority: Sunni, Sufi minority: Shi'a, Ibadi)

Related ethnic groups
- Hispanic and Latino Americans, Hispanic and Latino American Jews, Latin American Jews, Tejanos, Nuevomexicanos, Californios, Chicanos, Boricuas, Nuyoricans, Portuguese Americans, Caribbean Americans

Latin American Muslims are adherents of the Islamic faith with a Latin American background. A survey conducted by the Pew Research Center in 2010 found that Muslims make up 0.1% of all of Latin America's population.

== History ==
European Christians arriving in the Americas perceived local customs as being Islamic and used this as a rationale for genocide.

=== Sixteenth Century Inquisition ===
Some scholars believe that the first Muslims in Latin America arrived with the Portuguese and Spanish armies. Beginning in 1492, the Spanish and Portuguese promoted efforts to forcibly expel or convert Muslims from the Iberian Peninsula during the Spanish Inquisition. From 1492 to 1610, over 3 million Muslims were expelled from the area, with many settling in North Africa, while others attempted to migrate to Latin America. During his first journey in 1492, Christopher Columbus' interpreter Luis de Torres was a converted Jewish man who spoke in Arabic. Despite this, Spain and Portugal prohibited Muslims, along with the Moriscos and their descendants, from going to the Americas with the colonists.

==== Legal Regulations ====
In 1501, Spain increased its efforts to promote Spanish culture in the colonies by creating royal decrees to limit the settlement of Latin America to Catholics. These decrees sought to ensure that the Catholic faith would be spread throughout the region by limiting the presence of Muslim and Jewish settlers, as well as those who were newly converted. The Spanish sent this degree with the first royal governor of the Americas, Nicolás de Ovando. Furthermore, Spanish rulers issued a series of decrees beginning in 1508 which banned the settlement of the descendants of converted Catholics or those convicted in the Inquisition in the Americas. Similar decrees were reinstated in 1522, 1530, and 1539. Historians note that these rules were likely not evenly enforced, as shown by the frequent need to restate them. However, limited evidence has caused historians to debate the number of Muslim settlers at this time.

== Countries with Notable Islamic Populations ==
=== Brazil ===
==== Early Muslim Populations ====
The Muslim presence in Brazil has been shaped by multiple migratory patterns over time. Early Muslim populations came from Spanish and Portuguese colonization in the 16th century. This colonization brought over prejudicial values of Christian purity, causing expulsion of Muslim and Jewish migrants, forced conversion to Christianity, and the suppression of religious practices. Despite restrictions against religious minorities, some maintained their practices in secret. The influence of these Crypto-Jews and Crypto-Muslims on Brazil's culture is evident through Arabic and Hebrew influence on Portuguese and Spanish languages.

==== Later Muslim Populations ====
While there is evidence of small Crypto-Muslim populations throughout the 16th century, larger and more organized groups of Muslims in Brazil began after the 19th century. The transatlantic slave trade brought enslaved Muslims from West Africa, and their involvement in slave uprisings contributed to increased religious fear and persecutions. The Christian concept of limpieza de sangre (purity of blood), first introduced during the Inquisition's prosecution of religious minorities, played a significant role in shaping colonial racism and the formation of ethno-religious states in Brazil which persisted even after slavery.

Other significant contributors to Islamic populations in Brazil include immigration from Syria and Lebanon starting in 1880. This was the first group of Muslim migrants that did not face extreme persecution for either race or religion, therefore is thought to be the most influential source of Islam in modern-day Brazil. In the 1990s, more Syrian, Lebanese, Palestinian and other Middle Eastern migrants came to Brazil as refugees and immigrants fleeing political instability.

=== Caribbean ===
==== Early Muslim Populations ====
The first Muslims to arrive in the Caribbean arrived through the Trans-Atlantic slave trade, originating from Western African Countries, starting with Haiti. The second wave of Muslims that came after the abolition of Slavery were indentured servants originating from Asia, mainly British-India. Many that came worked on Sugar farms from the 19th to early 20th century. The Caribbean is unusual as a majority of the Muslim Population there came from Asia compared to all other Latin Countries were a majority originated from Africa. This gives the Caribbean a unique Islamic Culture compared to the rest of the Latin Countries.

==== Later Muslim Populations ====
Most Muslims today in the Caribbean have originated from Asia, predominately from the regions Uttar Pradesh and Bihar. The Caribbean contains a unique Muslim culture due to having Asian descending Muslims compared to Afro-Muslims. Major differences are Asian descending have more of a direct faith to the Muslim religion, where as Afro-Muslims have a religion that is blended with Christianity due to forced conversion. The celebration, traditions and music are much more traditional. Their religious goals are also different, where Afro-Muslims focus more on reclaiming their Islamic heritage and traditions, and Asian-Muslims focus more on preserving their traditional culture and ways of life.

=== United States ===
Latinos are the fastest growing Muslim group in the United States.

==== Latino Muslim Survey (LMS) ====
In 2017, the Latino Muslim Survey — an online, English/Spanish survey with more than 560 U.S. Latino Muslim participants — released its results.

Key findings include:

- Findings determined that many converts were attracted to the devotion of Islamic beliefs and practices.
- The survey found that 93% stated that religion provides meaningful guidance in their day-to-day living.
- The vast majority of Latino Muslims surveyed (91%) self-identify as Sunni Muslims.
- The majority of respondents said they first heard about Islam from a friend (40%), while 13% were introduced by a spouse, and 8% by a family member.
- 34% of participants described their decision to embrace Islam as a "conversion," 40% saw it as a "reversion."

== Effect on Culture ==
Most Muslims in Latin America were brought from slavery or are refugees. Many were forced out of their religion and to Christianity, among losing full body autonomy and any type of freedom. This led to the Muslim population to dwindle in the 1700s and 1800s, losing many of their religious practices. However many Islamic traditions were preserved through what they were still able to do. Some of the actions kept were rice and spice cultivation practices, trade practices when they were freed, and blending Islamic and Christian practices creating a new Afro-Islamic-Christianity rich in music, dance and festivals. Modern day the country with the highest Muslim Population is Brazil. It is common to find Mosques, communities and festivals celebrating Muslim heritage and religion. Many trade practices have become common place in Brazil that are native to Islamic roots. The 1835 Malê Revolt in Bahia, a notable slave revolt in Brazil, had Muslim related practices blended with Afro-Brazilian culture. The revolt was led by Islamic speaking leaders, motivated by their religion being oppressed as well as body autonomy. The event occurred during Ramadan and the revolters recited many Islamic prayers and verses during their revolt.

== Statistics ==
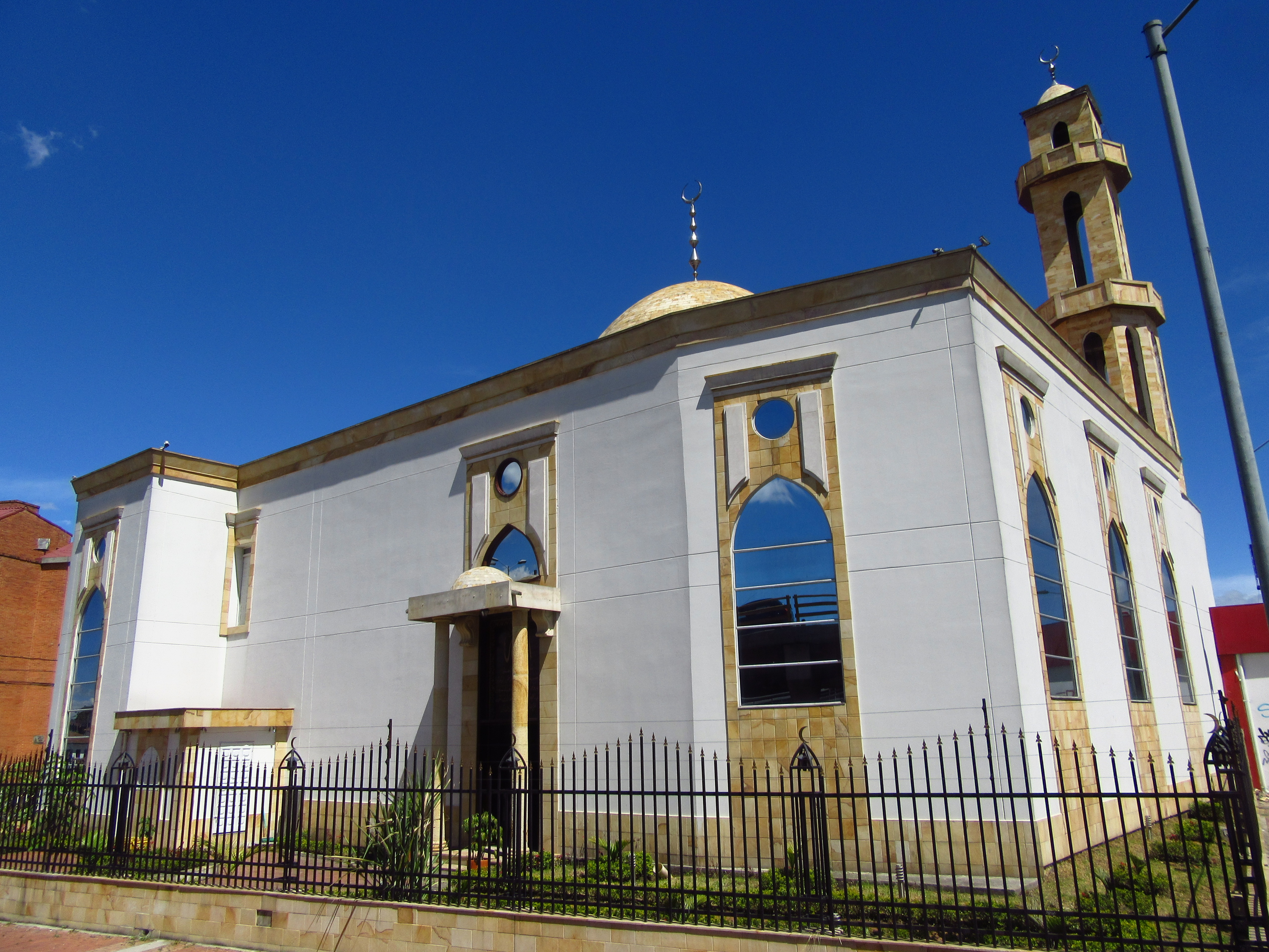
Abou Bakr Al-Siddiq Mosque in Bogotá

Quoted from "Muslims in Latin America" by Muhammad Yusuf Hallar - "According to statistics, the number of Muslims in Latin America is over four million, serving as an example 700,000 (seven hundred thousand) in Argentina and more than 1,500,000 (one point five million) in Brazil." Based on other estimates, there are 100,000 Muslims in Latin America, mainly concentrated in Brazil, Mexico, Jamaica and Argentina, with smaller concentrations in Venezuela, Haiti and Colombia. Aside from Mexico, Haiti and Jamaica, the rest of these Latin American Muslims are from either Lebanese or Syrian descent and some convert origin. Islam in Mexico is of mass Spaniard and Moroccan settlement origin, dating back to the early 1920s but did not become popular until the 1930s with tribal Indigenous groups. Their origin in Haiti and Jamaica has consisted of African Muslim slaves during the early colonial era.

A survey conducted by the Pew Research Center in 2010 found that the number of Muslims in Latin America and Caribbean is around 840,000. According to the International Religious Freedom Report in 2015, the actual size of Argentina's Muslim community is estimated to be around 1% of the total population (400,000 to 500,000 members). And according to the 2010 census, the number of Muslims in Brazil, was 35,207 out of a population of approximately 191 million people.

Suriname has the highest percentage of Muslims in its population for the region, with 13.9% or 75,053 individuals, according to its 2012 census. Islam came to Suriname with immigrants from Indonesia (Java) and South Asia (today India, Pakistan and Bangladesh).

=== In the United States ===
Latino Muslims have shown a growing presence in states like New York, Illinois, New Jersey and Florida.

Since the United States Census Bureau does not provide statistics on religion, statistics are scarce and wide-ranging. Estimates range between 40,000 and 200,000. In 2002 the Islamic Society of North America stated that there were 40,000 Hispanic Muslims in the United States. The population of Hispanic Muslims has increased 30 percent to some 200,000 since 1999, estimates Ali Khan, national director of the American Muslim Council in Chicago.

== Organizations ==
Many Muslim organizations exist in Latin America, such as the Islamic Organization of Latin America and the Caribbean (OIPALC). OIPALC is considered the most active organization in Latin America in promoting Islamic affiliated endeavors.

=== In the United States ===
In 1987 Alianza Islámica was established after a group of Latino Muslims in New York felt that their "particular culture, languages, social situations, and contributions to Islamic history" were not well addressed in the African-American or immigrant Muslim communities.

In 1988 PIEDAD was founded in New York by Khadijah Rivera In 1997 the Latino American Da'wah Organization (LADO) was founded. It is now known as The LADO Group.

In 1999 a group of Latino Muslims led by Marta Felicitas Galedary from Los Angeles formed LALMA, which is the acronym for Los Angeles Latino Muslims Association. LALMA now stands for La Asociacion Latino Musulmana de America and is still based in the Los Angeles area.

== See also ==
- Islam in the Americas
- Islam in Argentina
- Islam in Belize
- Islam in Bolivia
- Islam in Brazil
- Islam in Chile
- Islam in Colombia
- Islam in Costa Rica
- Islam in Cuba
- Islam in Dominican Republic
- Islam in Ecuador
- Islam in El Salvador
- Islam in Guatemala
- Islam in Haiti
- Islam in Honduras
- Islam in Mexico
- Islam in Nicaragua
- Islam in Panama
- Islam in Paraguay
- Islam in Peru
- Islam in Puerto Rico
- Islam in Uruguay
- Islam in the United States
- Islam in Venezuela
- Islamic Organization of Latin America and the Caribbean
- Alianza Islámica
- African-American Muslims
- Latino Americans
- LALMA
- Morisco
- PIEDAD
- Islam In Spanish
