= Parque Patricios (Buenos Aires Underground) =

Buenos Aires Underground station

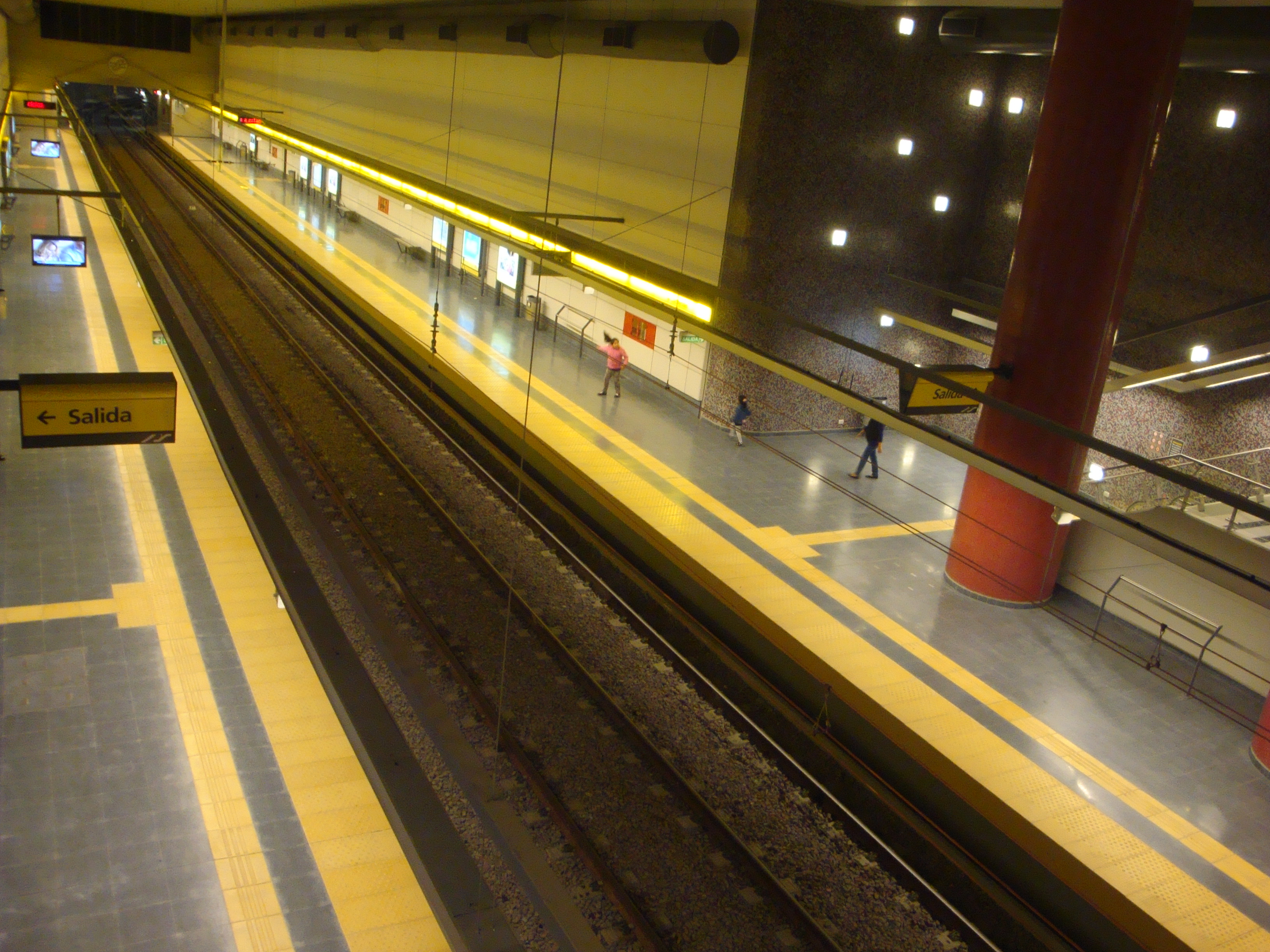

General information
- Location: Monteagudo 100
- Coordinates: 34°38′19″S 58°24′21″W
- Platforms: Side platforms

History
- Opened: 4 October 2011

Services
| Preceding station | Buenos Aires Underground | Following station |
|---|---|---|
| Caseros towards Facultad de Derecho | Line H | Hospitales Terminus |
Location

Parque Patricios Station is a station on Line H of the Buenos Aires Underground. It was inaugurated on 4 October 2011 as the southern terminus of one-station extension from Caseros. It remained the terminus of the line until 27 May 2013, when the line was extended to Hospitales.
