= IslamInSpanish =

U.S. non-profit organization

- Founded: 2013
- Founder: Jaime Fletcher
- Type: Non-profit organization
- Legal status: Active
- Purpose: Education about Islam in Spanish
- Headquarters: Houston, Texas, United States
- Region served: Worldwide
- Method: Audiovisual media, khutbahs, interactive website
- Website: www.islaminspanish.org

IslamInSpanish is an American educational, non-profit organization that seeks to educate Latinos about Islam in the Spanish language worldwide through audiovisual media (DVDs, TV, audio CDs, radio and interactive website). It distributes materials within the United States and to Spanish-speaking countries. It was established by Jaime Fletcher in Houston, Texas.

In 2013, IslamInSpanish began providing khutbahs (sermons) in Spanish at two locations in the Houston area. The weekly sessions are broadcast online to the worldwide Spanish-speaking Muslim population. In 2016, IslamInSpanish opened up the first Spanish-speaking mosque in Houston, and in December of that year, it organized the first National Latino Muslim Convention in cooperation with the Texas Dawah Convention. In 2024, the IslamInSpanish Centro Islámico was opened in Alief. It is a community hub for Latino Muslims to receive Islamic education in Spanish and is reported to have cost US$4 million.

== See also ==
- Latino Muslims
- Alianza Islámica
- Black Muslims
- Islam in the United States
- Latin American Muslims
