= Islam in Paraguay =

Islam in Paraguay (Islam en Paraguay, الإسلام في باراغواي ) is a minority religion. According to the latest statistics on Islam in Paraguay, the total number of Muslims is less than 1,000, representing 0.02% of the country's population (7.3 million people, as of 2021). According to other estimates, the number of Muslims in Paraguay is 15,000.

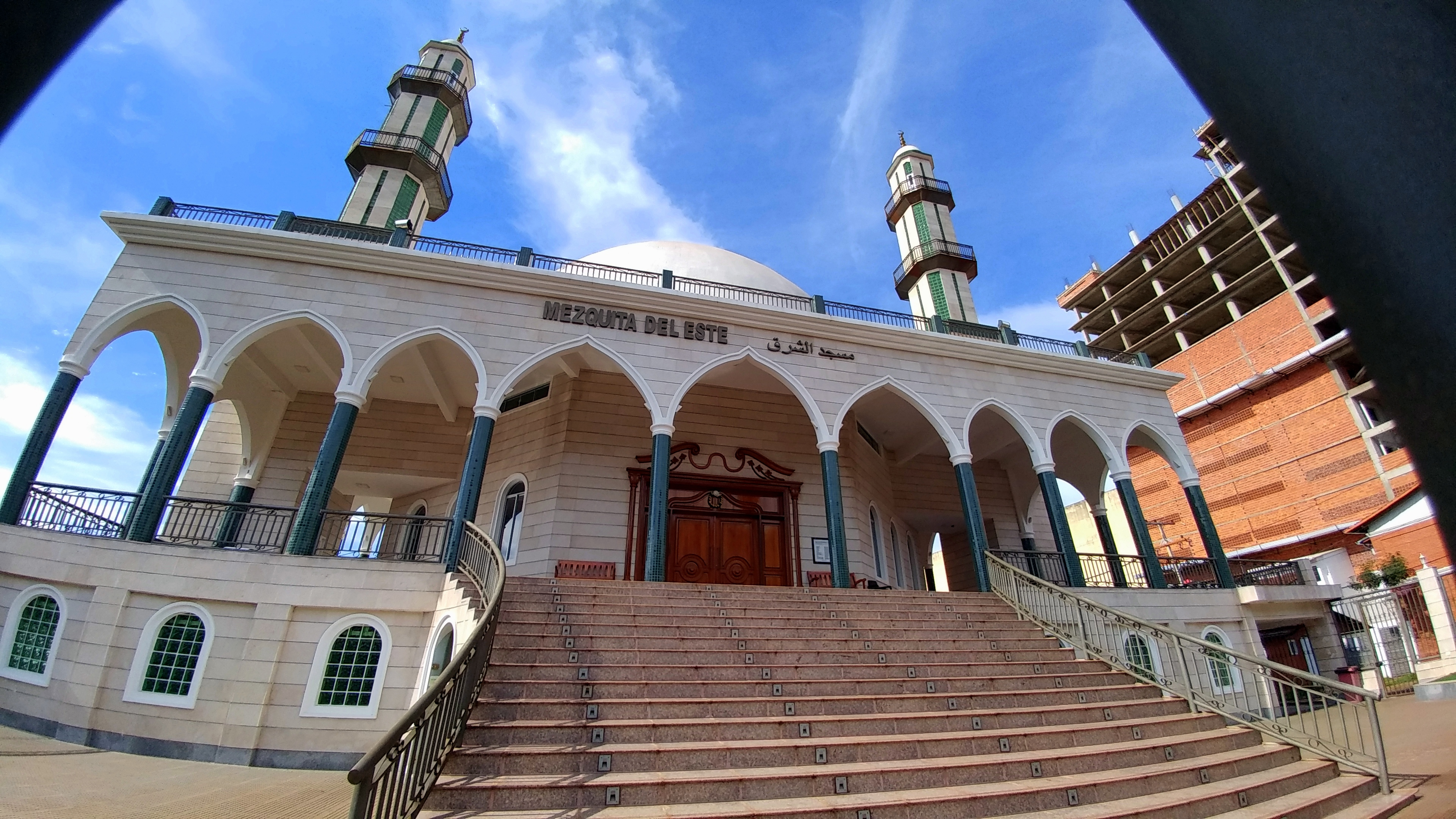
Mezquita del Este mosque in Ciudad del Este, Paraguay

== History ==
Islam began to spread in Paraguay in the late 20th century with Arab immigrants. Islam is a minority religion in Paraguay, as over 95% of the population identify as Christian (89% Catholic and 8% Protestant). Minority religions in Paraguay include Mormonism, Baháʼí, Islam, Buddhism, Judaism, etc.

Most of Paraguay's Muslims are Arab immigrants from the Middle East (Syria, Lebanon, and Palestine) and their descendants. Beginning in the 1970s, Sunni Muslim Arabs began to migrate, especially to Ciudad del Este, which is located on the Brazilian border and has great opportunities for forestry, agriculture and commerce. Sunni Muslims outnumber Shiites who migrated earlier from southern Lebanon.

The 1992 census recorded 872 Muslims in Paraguay, 486 of whom lived in the Alto Paraná, whose capital is Ciudad del Este. According to the 2005 census, there were 507 Muslims in Paraguay, or 0.008% of the Paraguayan population.

The capital Asunción is known as a "melting pot", thanks to the large number of immigrants of various nationalities (including those from Syria and Lebanon), and the Itapua Department also has Muslim communities, particularly in the department's capital, Encarnación.

The establishment of Islamic organizations in Paraguay has had a direct impact on the development of Islam in Paraguay. The local population, as a result of marriage with Arab immigrants, began to accept Islam.

== Islamic organizations ==
The largest Islamic organization in Paraguay is the Islamic Beneficial Cultural Center of Asunción (Centro Benéfico Cultural Islámico Asunción), founded in 1990, headed by Faozi Mohamed Omairi. The community is located in and around the capital of the country, Asunción, as well as in Ciudad del Este.

In 1988, a Shiite Muslim community, the Arab-Islamic Center of Paraguay (Centro Árabe Islámico Paraguayo), was founded in the Alto Paraná department, headed by Lebanese businessman Hussein Taijen.

== See also ==
- Latin American Muslims
- Latino Muslims
- List of mosques in Paraguay
