= Khadijah Rivera =

Puerto Rican Muslim convert and activist (1950–2009)

Khadijah Rivera (1950 – November 22, 2009) founded the first organization, PIEDAD, for Latinas of the Islamic faith in 1988. She was a Puerto Rican Muslim convert from Roman Catholicism. She was married to an Egyptian Muslim. Khadijah Rivera was involved in some two dozen social causes. She encouraged members to become active in their mosques. During her life, she was a social activist and community worker. She taught at a local Tampa Bay school. She was a coordinator of Project Downtown Tampa, a project that helps the homeless and needy. In summer 2009, she began working at CAIR's Tampa office.

Rivera died on November 22, 2009. She was a mother of five children.

A brief biography of Khadijah Rivera is featured in "Latino Muslims: Our Journeys to Islam."

== See also ==
- Latino Muslims
- Black Muslims
- Islam in the United States
- Latin American Muslims
- Latino American Dawah Organization
