= Islam in Panama =

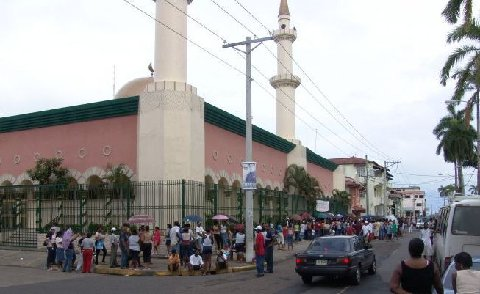
El Centro Cultural Islamico de Colón

Panama is a predominantly Christian country, with Islam being a minority religion. Due to the secular nature of Panama's constitution, Muslims are free to proselytize and build places of worship in the country.

According to a 2009 Pew Research Center report, there are 24,000 Muslims in Panama who constitute 0.7 percent of the population.

== Early history ==
It is believed that the first Muslims in Panama were Mandinka slaves, brought by the Portuguese slave traders to work the gold mines in 1552. The Mandinka were mainly animist and Muslims at that time, and their importation was prohibited by Spanish Laws but was violated by the Portuguese nonetheless. A group of about 500 that arrived on the Atlantic coast of Panama in 1552, escaped from a sinking ship. They elected a man called Bayano (Vaino) as their leader in the fight against the colonizers. They formed councils, in the areas now known as Darién Province, Bay of San Miguel, San Blas Islands and the area along the Bayano River, named after Bayano. Bayano gained truces with Panama's colonial governor, but the well known Commander Pedro de Ursúa successfully captured the guerrilla leader, who was sent to Peru and then Spain where he died in comfort at the expense of the royal treasury with an annuity. Although many insist that Bayano was a Muslim, he attacked Spanish troops under the cry of "SANTIAGO A ELLOS," asking the Christian patron saint of chivalry to help them.

== Modern Period ==
The first wave of Muslims were single-male immigrants from the Indian subcontinent and Lebanon who arrived from 1904 to 1913 and later married local women. The first mosque was built by the Ahmadiyya Muslim movement, in 1930. In 1929 another group came from Bombay, India who formed the Sunni Indo-Pakistani Muslim Society. From 1929-1948 this organization (renamed Panama Muslim Mission) built a mosque in Panama City. Before construction was completed, the building was used for Eid prayers and classes for new Muslims, who numbered about twenty-five blacks of West Indian descent. There was also another group practicing Islam in Colón led by a Jamaican named Basil Austkan, who rented a place for salat on 6th Street and Broadway. In 1932 there was a group of Muslim in San Miguel, Calidonia in Panama City who resided in Short Street where they held meetings and prayers. The Muslims in Panama City of Indo-Pakistan origins had no communal structure until 1951 when the first families arrived. In 1963, they purchased a plot in the local cemetery called Jardin de Paz; in 1991, property was purchased in an area called Arraijan, which is now used solely as a Muslim cemetery.

== Community development: 1970s to present ==
In the mid-1970s some native Panamanians influenced by the Nation of Islam and led by Abdul Wahab Johnson and Suleyman Johnson, began propagating Islam in Panama City and Colón. After meeting with Dr. Abdulkhabeer Muhammad they began to study orthodox Sunni Islam. In 1977 they received financing from Arab merchants in Colon to rent a place on 7th Street and Central Avenue, Colón. This group, due to lack of knowledge and assistance, eventually disintegrated. The Indo-Pakistani Muslims began teaching their children at home in 1965 until 1973, when a small teaching program began in a room above Bazar Hindustan on Central Avenue, Panama City. In 1978, they began to use a place in the area of Perejil, Panama City, where prayers and meetings took place until the completion of the El Centro Cultural Islámico de Colón on January 15, 1982. This masjid was built jointly by the Islamic Call Society (based in Libya) and Salomon Bhikhu a local merchant from India. Since its inauguration, classes have been held in the evenings and Sundays for new Muslims and people interested in Islam, given by Dr. Abdulkhaber Muhammad and in his absence Hamza Beard. In 1991 the Muslim community purchased in Arraiján, which is now used solely as a Muslim cemetery. As of March 1997, there were four mosques Panama.

== Mosques ==
- Jama Mosque (Panama City)
- Madina Masjid: Located in the Vista Hermosa area of Panama City, this mosque serves the local Sunni community.
- Musalla Ave. Central: Situated on Calle 19 Este in Panama City, this prayer space provides facilities for daily prayers.

== See also ==
- Religion in Panama
- Latin American Muslims
- Latino Muslims
