= Levantine Arab Argentines =

عرب الأرجنتين (Arabic) Árabe-argentinos (Spanish)
- People per 100,000 inhabitants in Argentina with one of the 15 most common Arab-Argentine surnames.

Regions with significant populations
- Predominantly in the Argentine Northwest, the Greater Buenos Aires and Córdoba

Languages
- Spanish · Arabic (Levantine)

Religion
- Majority: Christianity (Catholicism · Eastern Orthodoxy · Syriac Orthodoxy); Minority: Islam (Sunnism · Shiism) · Druze

Related ethnic groups
- Arabs (Syrians · Lebanese); Arab Brazilians · Arab Chileans · Arab Uruguayans · Arab Americans

Levantine Arab Argentines are Argentine citizens who are fully or partially of Levantine Arab (Lebanese, Syrian and Palestinian) descent, primarily Arab Christians. Argentina has one of the largest Christian Arab diaspora in the world.

Although a highly diverse group of Argentines — in ancestral origins, religion and historic identities — Arab Argentines hold a common identity in the Argentine consciousness, being universally known as turcos ("Turks"), like in the rest of Latin American countries.

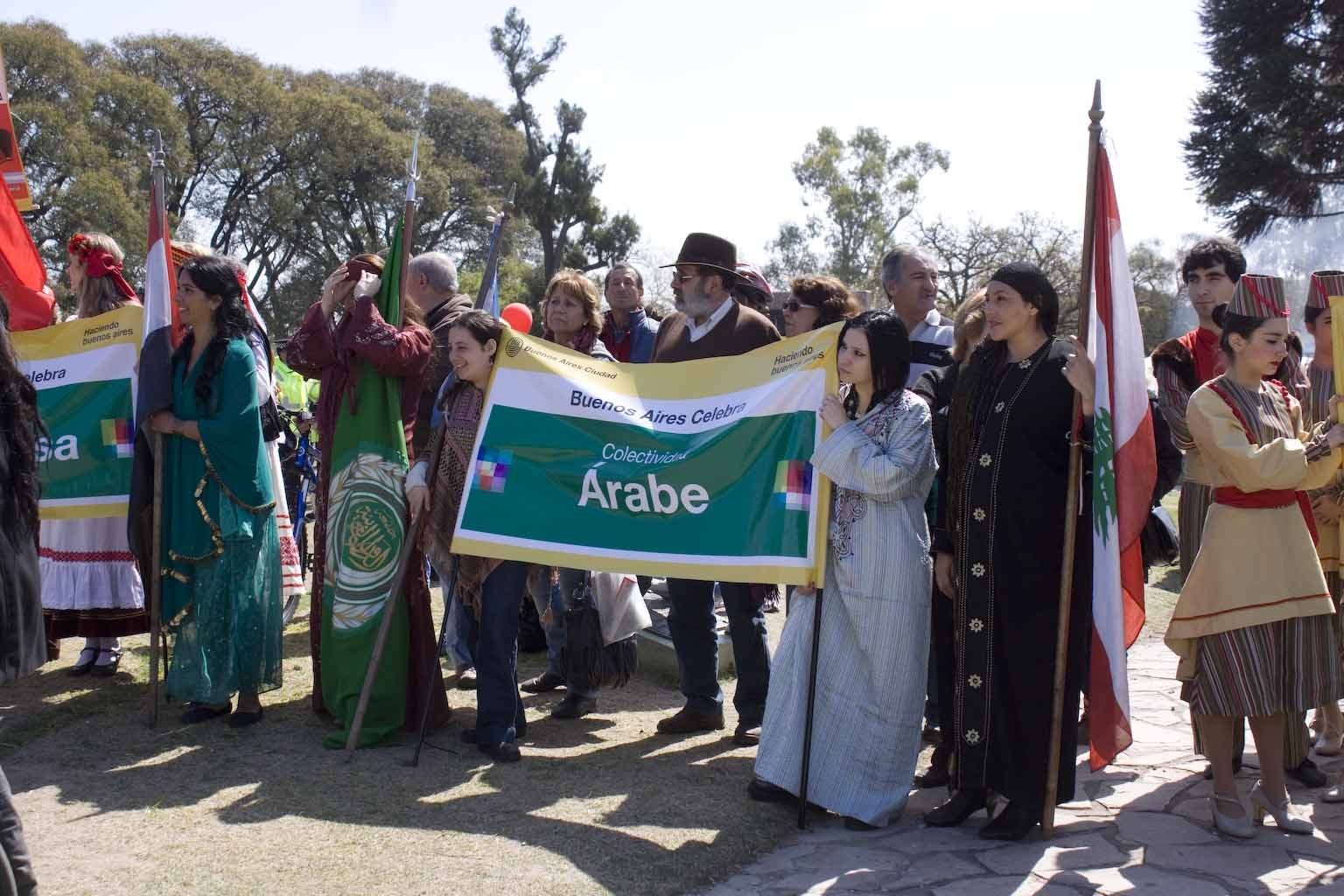
Arab-Argentines during the Day of the immigrants in Buenos Aires.

The majority of the Arab Argentines are from either Lebanese or Syrian background with a smaller amount of Palestinian background. Interethnic marriage in the Arab community, regardless of religious affiliation, is very high; most community members have only one parent who has Arab ethnicity. As a result of this, the Arab community in Argentina shows marked language shift away from Arabic. Only a few speak any Arabic and such knowledge is often limited to a few basic words. Instead the majority, especially those of younger generations, speak Spanish as a first language, and have thoroughly assimilated in the local culture, Arab Argentines have a regular presence and have distinguished themselves in all walks of national life on a par with the rest of the country's melting pot population.

== History ==
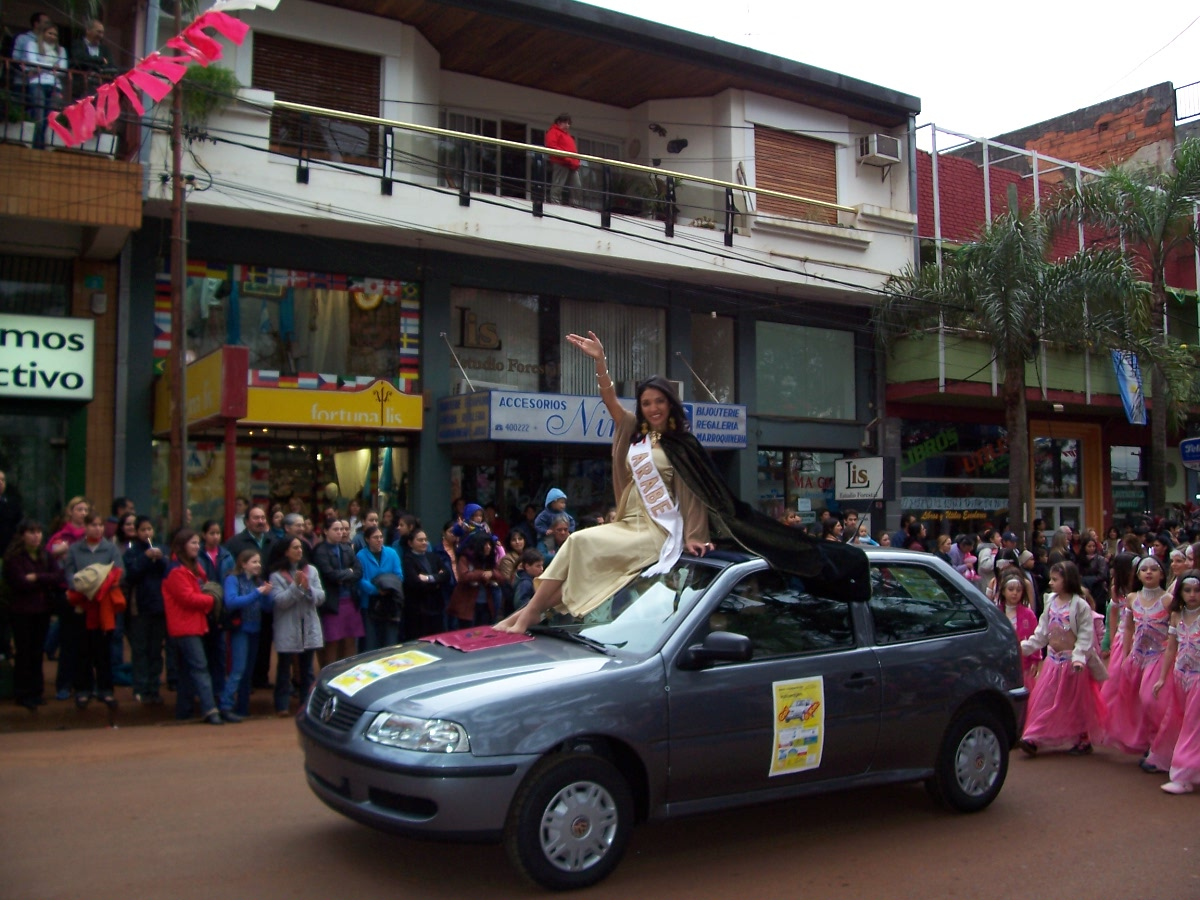
Rocío Chalup, Queen of the Arab community in the Fiesta Nacional del Inmigrante in Oberá, Misiones.

However, in the 19th century Argentina saw the first real wave of Levantine Arabs to settle within its territory. Most of the Arabs who came during this time period were from Lebanon and Syria as a result of the 1860 Mount Lebanon civil war (During that time, Lebanon and Syria were Ottoman provinces). While Arab communities existed by 1864, systematic records did not appear before 1868. From 1891 to 1920, 367,348 people of Arabic heritage immigrated into Argentina. When they were first processed in the ports of Argentina, they were classified as Turks (Spanish turcos) because what is modern day Lebanon and Syria was a territory of the Turkish Ottoman Empire, hence the popular (and erroneous) demonym (comparable to others applied in the majority immigrant country to other groups, such as tano (Italian-Argentinian), gallego (Spanish-Argentinian), ruso (Jewish Argentinian) etc.

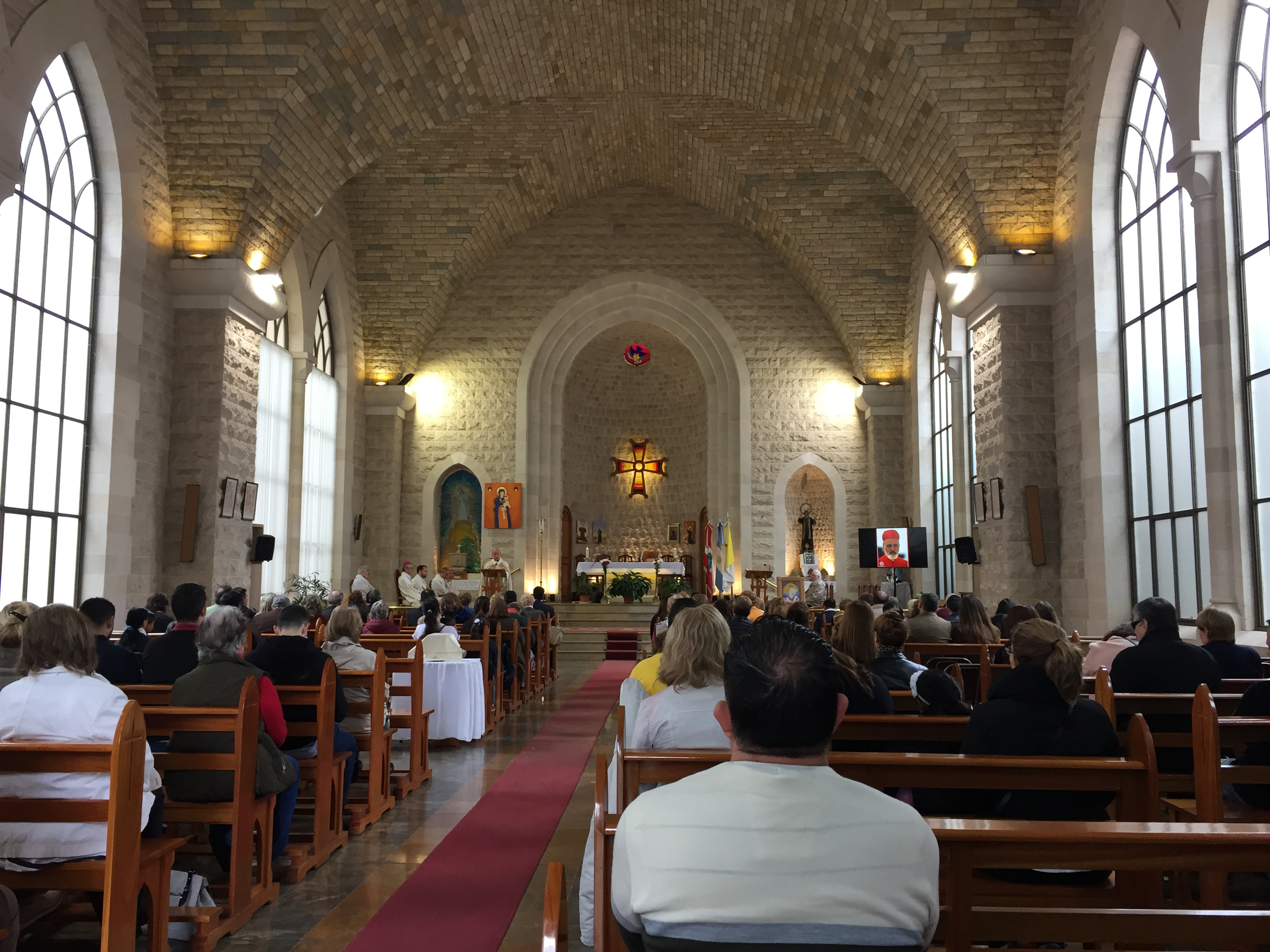
The St. Maron's Cathedral in Buenos Aires, of Maronite origin.

The causes for Levantine Arabs to leave their homeland were an accelerated increase in demographics in Lebanon, the persecution by the Ottoman Turks and the Italo-Turkish War. In 1940, the number of Levantine Arab immigrants from Syria and Lebanon increased again because young men were being recruited to fight in World War II (at that time, Syria and Lebanon were French colonies). This number increased even further during the Lebanese Civil War, which began in 1958. The number of immigrants decreased drastically during the fall of Juan Domingo Perón's government, due to the country's poor economic situation and the oil boom in Arab countries.

In 1959, Pope John XXIII erected the Ordinariate for Eastern Catholics in Argentina for the pastoral care of Catholic faithful of Eastern Rites, which included the Maronites, and in 1990, Pope John Paul II founded the Maronite Catholic Eparchy of Saint Charbel in Buenos Aires, based at the St. Maron's Cathedral.

The Levantine Arab immigrants settled in the provinces of Buenos Aires, Córdoba, Salta, Jujuy, Tucumán, La Rioja, San Juan, Mendoza, Santiago del Estero, Misiones, Chaco, and the Patagonia. A large percentage on Levantine Arabs settled in the Cuyo region (which is made up of the provinces of San Juan, San Luis, Mendoza, and La Rioja) whose landscape and crops (olive, vineyards) resemble at time the Middle East's.

== Notable people ==
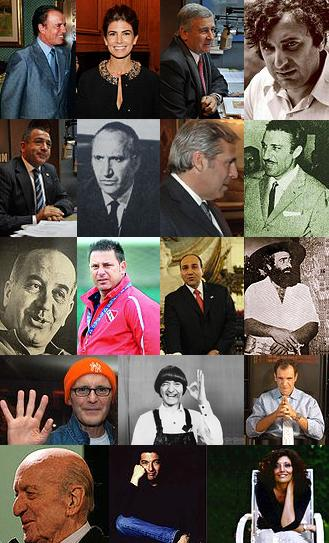
Notable Argentines of Levantine Arab descent.

- Jorge Antonio (1917–2007), businessman
- Julio Asad (born 1953), footballer
- Omar Asad (born 1971), footballer and football manager
- Yamil Asad (born 1994), footballer
- Alfredo Avelín (1927–2012), politician, physician and author
- Alejandro Awada (born 1961), character actor
- Juliana Awada (born 1974), businesswoman
- Carlos Salim Balaá (1925-2022), actor
- Elias Bazzi (born 1981), footballer
- Lucia Caram (born 1966), Dominican Order nun, chef, writer, and presenter
- Jorge Cafrune (1937–1978), folklorist singer
- Yamila Díaz (born 1976), model
- Basilio Lami Dozo (1929–2017), military officer and fighter pilot
- Eduardo Falú (1923–2013), folk music guitarist and composer
- Juan Falú (born 1948), classical guitarist and composer
- Daniel Hadad (born 1961), lawyer, businessman and journalist
- Omar Hasan (born 1971), rugby union footballer
- Alberto Hassan (1942–2025), tenor singer
- Claudio Husaín (born 1974), footballer
- Darío Husaín (born 1976), footballer
- Juan Luis Manzur (born 1969), surgeon and politician
- Carlos Menem (1930–2021), politician and president of Argentina
- Eduardo Menem (born 1938), politician
- Antonio Mohamed (born 1970), footballer and football manager
- Daniel Mustafá (born 1984), footballer
- Javier Muñoz (born 1980), footballer
- Ramón Saadi (1949–2023), senator and governor of Catamarca
- Vicente Saadi (1913–1988), politician
- Elías Sapag (1911–1993), politician
- Felipe Sapag (1917–2010), politician and governor of Neuquén
- Luz Sapag (1944–2010), politician
- Mohamed Alí Seineldín (1933-2009), Argentine army colonel
- Zulema Yoma (born 1942), public figure

== See also ==
- Argentines
- Arab diaspora
- Lebanese diaspora
- Syrian diaspora
- Immigration to Argentina
- White Argentines
- Lebanese Argentines
- Syrian Argentines
- Christianity in Argentina
- Catholic Church in Argentina
- Islam in Argentina
- Islamic Organization of Latin America
