= Islamic Organization of Latin America =

Islamic organization based in Buenos Aires, Argentina

Islamic Organization of Latin America and the Caribbean
- Organización Islámica Para América Latina y el Caribe
- Abbreviation: OIPALC, IOLA, OIPAL
- Headquarters: Buenos Aires, Argentina
- Location: Argentina
- Website: http://www.islamerica.org.ar
- Formerly called: Islamic Organization of Latin America (IOLA), Organización Islámica Para América Latina (OIPAL)

The Islamic Organization of Latin America and the Caribbean (OIPALC Spanish: Organización Islámica Para América Latina y el Caribe, previously known as the Islamic Organization of Latin America (IOLA/OIPAL)), headquartered in Buenos Aires, Argentina, is considered the most active organization in promoting the affairs of Latin American Muslims and Caribbean Muslims in the region.

OIPALC, headquartered in Buenos Aires, owes its prominence partially to The King Fahd Islamic Cultural Center, one of the largest mosques in all of Latin America as of 2005. OIPALC holds events to promote the unification of Muslims living in Latin America and the Caribbean, as well as the general propagation of Islam throughout the Americas.

The organization has been active since 1992. In 2003, OIPALC sponsored 13 Muslim youths from multiple countries (Argentina, Chile, Brazil, Uruguay, Bolivia, Paraguay, Venezuela, Curaçao, Guatemala, Costa Rica, and Ecuador) to Hajj. At a meeting, on July 19, 2005, the heads of the Islamic cultural centers assigned the Islamic Educational, Scientific and Cultural Organization (ISESCO) to prepare comprehensive studies and reports on the Islamic cultural work in Latin America as well as recommend practical proposals and field projects. The head of then-IOLA, Muhammad Yousef Hajer, was assigned to prepare a directory for the Muslim cadres in the region in coordination with the heads of the Islamic cultural centers and the Islamic societies in Latin America.

== See also ==
- Latin American Muslims
- Arab Argentine
- Arab Brazilian
- Latino Muslims
