= Abou Bakr Al-Siddiq Mosque =

Mosque in Bogotá, Colombia

- Spanish: Mezquita Abou Bakr Al-Siddiq
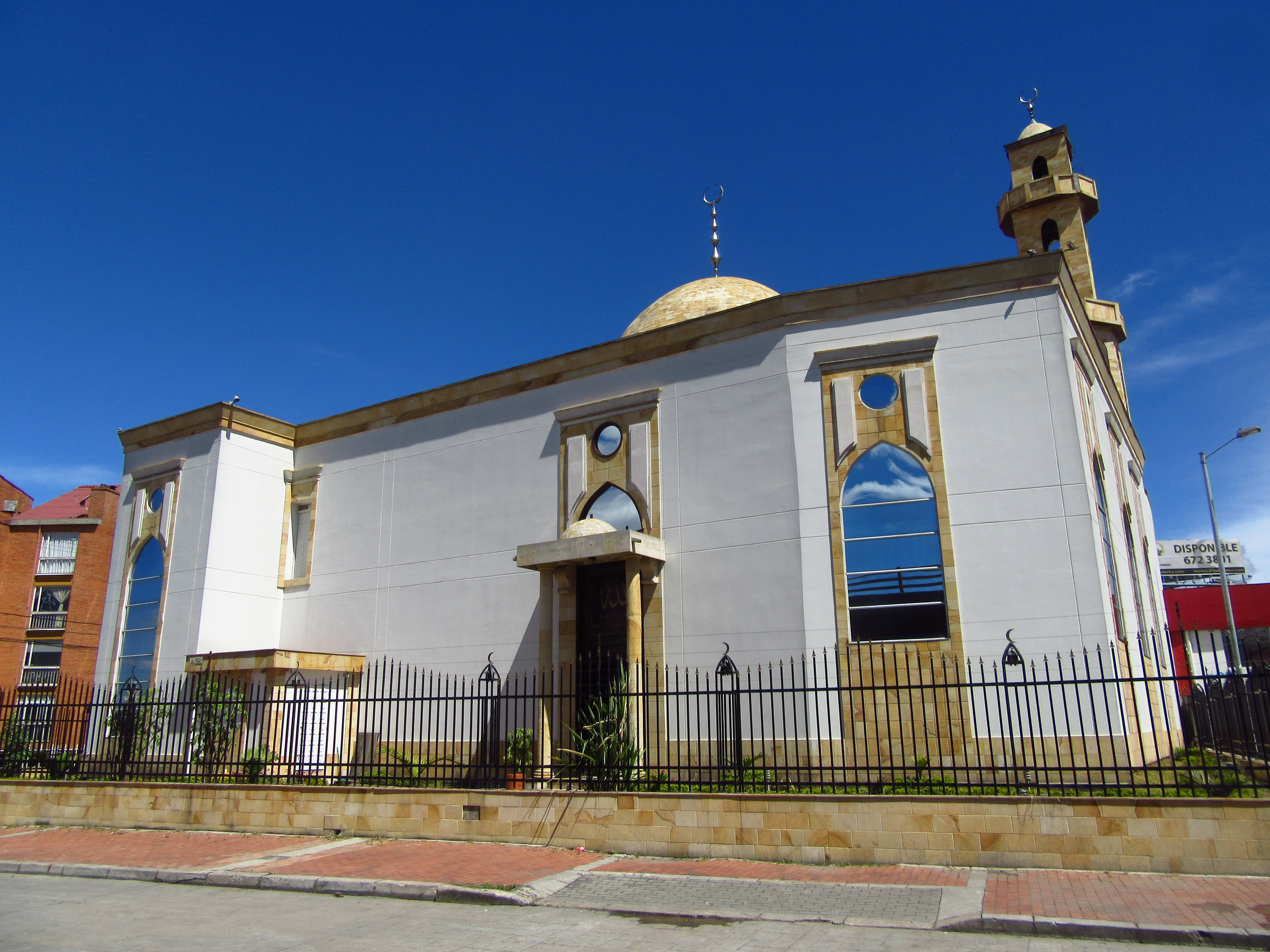
- The mosque in 2017

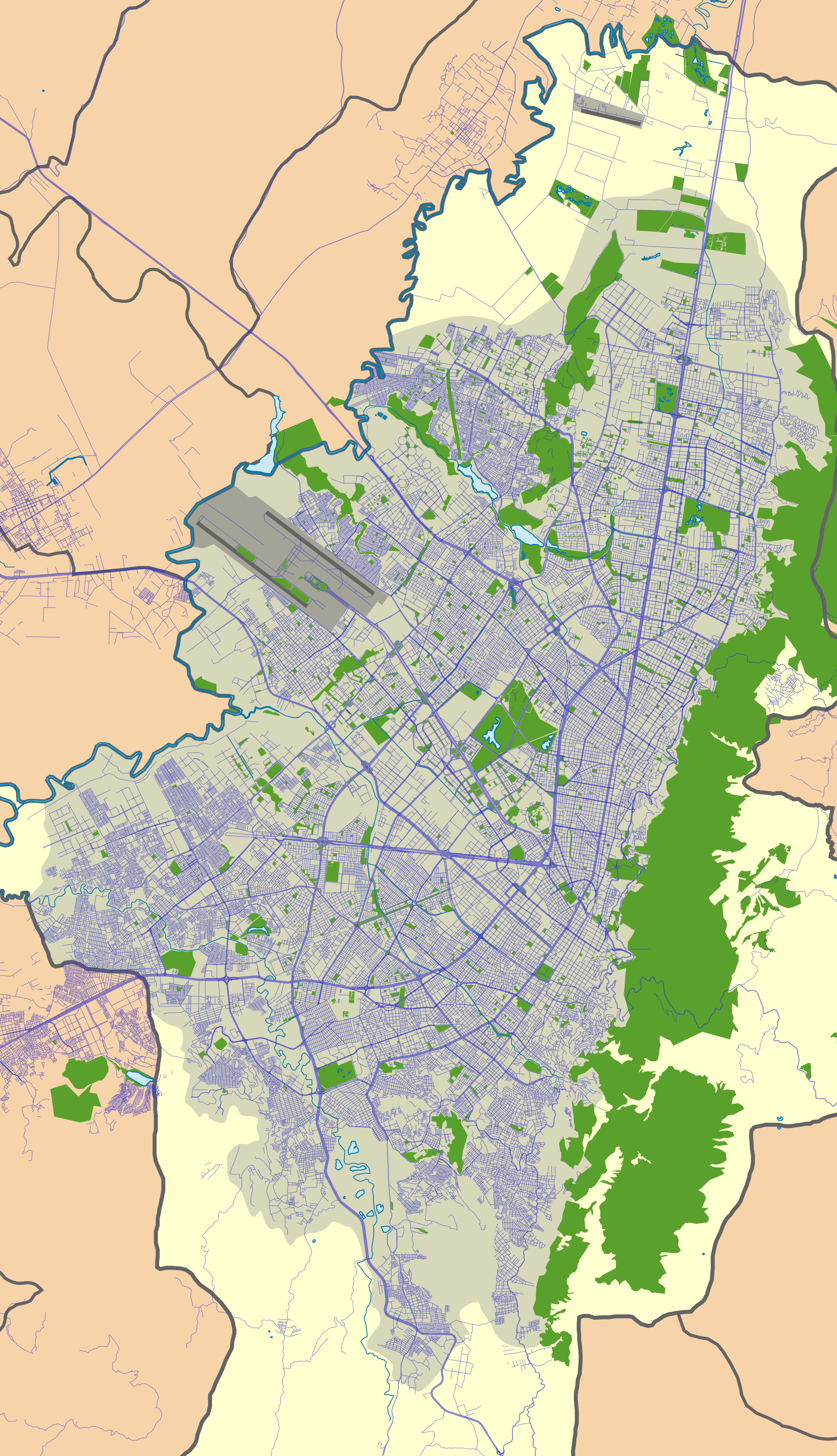
- Location of the mosque in Bogotá

Religion
- Affiliation: Islam
- Ecclesiastical or organisational status: Mosque
- Status: Active

Location
- Location: Bogotá
- Country: Colombia
- Coordinates: 4.67453°N 74.06742°W

Architecture
- Type: Mosque architecture
- Groundbreaking: 2010
- Completed: 2011

Specifications
- Dome: One
- Minaret: One

The Abou Bakr Al-Siddiq Mosque (Spanish: Mezquita Abou Bakr Al-Siddiq) is a mosque in Bogotá, Colombia.

== History ==
The land where the mosque stands today was purchased in 2010. Soon the construction of the mosque commenced within the same year. It was then completed a year later in 2011 and it was officially opened in the same year.

The mosque is the largest mosque in Bogotá.

== See also ==
- Islam in Colombia
- List of mosques in the Americas
