= Alianza Islámica =

Latino Muslim organization

- Formation: 1986
- Website: alianzaislamica.org

From the late 1980s to the mid-2000s, Alianza Islámica was the largest and most influential Latino Muslim organization in the United States. It was co-founded in New York City's Spanish Harlem by three Puerto Rican Muslims: John (Yahya) Figueroa, Ramon (Rahim) Ocasio, and Freddie (Ibrahim) Gonzalez, who all lived within five blocks of each other.

== History ==
Figueroa, Ocasio, and Gonzalez all came of age during the tumultuous 1960s and early 1970s. As teenagers, they became associated with the militant Young Lords during that organization's heyday in New York City. Ocasio, Figueroa, and Gonzalez participated in organizations affiliated with the Party.

After ending their association with the YLP, Figueroa and Ocasio briefly joined the Nation of Islam breakaway group The Five-Percent Nation.

Between late 1972 and mid-1973, all three of the future founders converted to Islam. In 1975, Figueroa, Ocasio, and Gonzalez joined the Islamic Party of North America, a Washington, D.C.–based Muslim organization. It was the United States' first constitutionally-based indigenous Islamic organization. With an emphasis on disciplined, coordinated activism, the Islamic Party expressed Islam through civic engagement and addressed problems of poverty and social and economic injustice.

Ocasio moved to IPNA's Washington headquarters and was eventually elected to that branch's Guidance Council. Meanwhile, Figueroa and Gonzalez continued the Party's work in New York. Ocasio rejoined Figueroa and Gonzalez in New York City in 1978. What followed were years of dawah (Islamic proselytizing) and attempts at organizing, which met with limited success.

In 1986, the trio collaborated on a successful event at the Museo del Barrio on Fifth Avenue in New York entitled "Reclamado Nuestra Herencia Islamica" (Reclaiming Our Islamic Heritage). There, they met Daniel Ahmad Mena from Florida and Carl Askia Al Amin from Chicago, who, along with Figueroa, Ocasio, and Gonzalez, formed the first iteration of Alianza Islamica. A virtual, three-city partnership, it most notable accomplishment was its eponymous journal, the first bilingual Islamic periodical ever published in the United States. Logistical problems, however, led to the organization's dissolution after nearly two years.

In the late 1980s, Figueroa and Ocasio discussed establishing a Barrio-based storefront center inspired by the Mosque of Islamic Brotherhood's tea room of the 1970s. The center would aim to be a calmer and non-intimidating environment, in contrast to the alienation of high pressure proselytizing.

Meanwhile, Figueroa's work with recovering addicts led to a sizable number of converts and the first Muslim recovery group, Brothers in Recovery. With these new Muslims at its core, Figueroa and Ocasio decided to resurrect Alianza Islamica. A storefront was secured at 1717 Lexington Avenue, near 107th Street, in El Barrio, Spanish Harlem.

Though Alianza Islamica's priority was to spread of the message of Islam, a more holistic approach was advanced to best serve its disadvantaged community. To that end, Alianza developed GED and ESL programs as well as programs on health and nutrition, employment assistance, and drug counseling. A significant number of spousal abuse cases, primarily in marriages between Latina women and Arab men, prompted Alianza Islamica also to take action in and initiate a counseling program in this area.

At a time when Muslim institutions treated their fellow Muslims who died of AIDS/HIV as pariahs, Alianza became the first Islamic organization to ritually wash the bodies of Muslims who had died of the disease. Alianza Islamic also conducted outreach programs to educate Muslims and non-Muslims alike on AIDS/HIV.

To dispel the spectre of the alien, Alianza embarked on Islamizing Latino cultural elements. At religious holidays such as Eid al-Fitr and Eid al-Adha, lamb and chicken replaced pork in traditional dishes, and congas and "guitarras" created a soundtrack authentically Muslim and Latino.

Alianza Islamica cleared drug dealers from the neighborhood on at least two occasions. On the second occasion, the owner of a building across the street offered Alianza Islamica a new location in return for their assistance with ridding his building of drug dealers from the notorious Jamaican Posse. Alianza used the opportunity to establish La Mezquita del Barrio, the first Latino Muslim mosque on the East Coast, and possibly the nation.

After Alianza cleared the drug dealers from the area, the landlord initiated eviction proceedings against Alianza. After its removal from the premises, Alianza resettled at 287 Alexander Avenue in the South Bronx. The organization disbanded shortly after a fire destroyed their building in 2005.

== Post Alianza Islamica ==
Ibrahim Gonzalez went on to be a musician, activist, and television and radio personality known primarily for his popular radio show on WBAI. He died in his sleep in 2013 at age 57.

After 30 years on the railroad, Figueroa devoted himself to drug counseling and writing and lecturing on Alianza Islamica's legacy and Islam's spiritual dimension.

Ocasio also ended his railroad career after 35 years and settled to a life of writing, lecturing, and spending time on the family farm.

In 2021, Rahim Ocasio with Juan Jose Galvan announced their book project, Alianza Islamica: Spanish Harlem’s Islamic Odyssey.

== See also ==
- Latino Muslims
- Black Muslims
- Islam in the United States
- Latin American Muslims
- Latino American Dawah Organization
