= Islamic Center of Southern California =

Islamic cultural center in Los Angeles, California

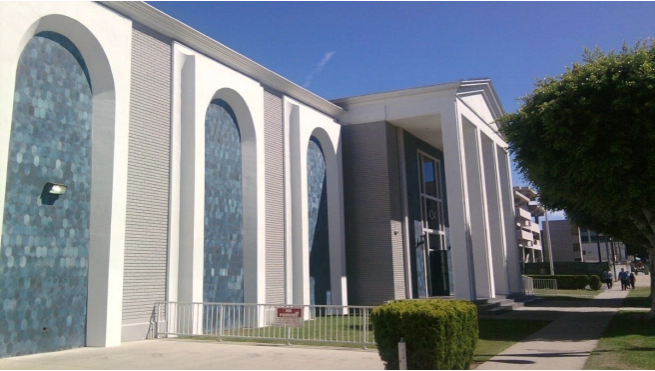

- Location in Los Angeles Location in California

Religion
- Affiliation: Islam
- Ecclesiastical or organisational status: non-profit religious organization
- Leadership: Omar Ricci

Location
- Location: 434 Vermont Ave, Los Angeles, CA 90020
- Coordinates: 34.066384°N 118.291312°W

Architecture
- Type: Mosque
- Style: Islamic architecture
- Established: 1952 (original) late 1970s (current)

Specifications
- Dome: 0
- Minaret: 0

Website
- www.icsconline.org

The Islamic Center of Southern California is a mosque and Islamic cultural center located in Los Angeles, California. It is located on Vermont Avenue adjacent to the Chinese Consulate General in the Wilshire Center neighborhood of Los Angeles. It is one of the largest mosques in Southern California with thousands praying there every Friday. Although the institution dates back to 1952, the center's current mosque opened in the late 1970s.

== History ==
The center was founded in 1952 and occupied a rented property on Fountain Avenue in the East Hollywood neighborhood of Los Angeles. When the center was established, it was the only mosque in Greater Los Angeles. It served a very small community of Muslim families and many early attendants were foreign Muslims attending local universities.

In the early 1960s, the mosque in East Hollywood was sold in favor of a property in City Terrace close to California State University, Los Angeles.

=== Community growth ===
As immigration restrictions were relaxed following the passage of the Immigration and Nationality Act of 1965, the Muslim community around the mosque and throughout Greater Los Angeles grew. The presence of the mosque in the region attracted further attendees from places as far as South Bay and Orange County.

In 1966, Ishaa and Tarawih prayers were held for the first time.

In 1968, the property in City Terrace was sold in favor of a property in Jefferson Park. It was at this location the center established Juma prayer, Tafsir on the Quran, a weekend Islamic school program, and formalized Islamic marriage services.

In 1969, the first Eid prayer was held at the mosque.

=== Expansion ===
In 1972, Dr. Sabri El-Ferra made the announcement that the center would again begin looking for a larger property closer to downtown due to the continued growth of the Muslim community in the Greater Los Angeles Area. The center moved about 3 mi (4.8 km) to the northeast on 434 Vermont Avenue sometime in the late 1970s, which remains the home of the center to this day.

After the incidents public and religious officials from the Jewish community along with the California Deputy Attorney General, appeared at the mosque to condemn the vandalism as hate crime.

== Interfaith Activities ==
Since its inception and even more recently, the Islamic Center of Southern California has worked to reach out to members of other faith groups. In 2010 the Director of religious affairs for the center attended Rosh Hashanah services at a nearby synagogue in order to increase interfaith dialogue. During the controversy over the construction of a mosque in New York City near the site of the 9/11 attacks, local religious leaders from the Jewish, Roman Catholic, and assorted Christian churches gathered with members of the Islamic Center of Southern California to give support for the construction saying that opposition to the construction "was rooted in intolerance" Since 2001, the center, along with mosques across Southern California, has been hosting an Open Mosque day in which non-Muslims can visit the mosque for a tour and ask questions. It was created as a way to improve relations between the local Muslim community and non-Muslims and also as a way to help non-Muslims learn about Islamic culture and certain parts of ideology.

== Facilities ==
The center also houses New Horizon School - Los Angeles with about 105 students from preschool to fifth grade. This is separate from the center's Sunday School programming.

== See also ==
- List of mosques in the United States
- Muslim Public Affairs Council
- Islam in the United States
