= List of indentured servants =

This is a list of people who were once indentured servants.

- Matthew Ashby
- Sally Brant
- William Buckland (architect)
- William Butten
- John Casor
- Judith Catchpole
- William Ewen
- Alexandre Exquemelin
- Mary Morrell Folger
- John Howland
- Elizabeth Hubbard (Salem witch trials)
- Anthony Johnson (colonist)
- William Moraley
- François l'Olonnais
- Milly Swan Price
- Richard Frethorne
- Janey Tetary
- John A. Treutlen
- Peter Williamson (memoirist)
- Harriet E. Wilson
