= Hosay =

Muslim Indo-Caribbean commemoration

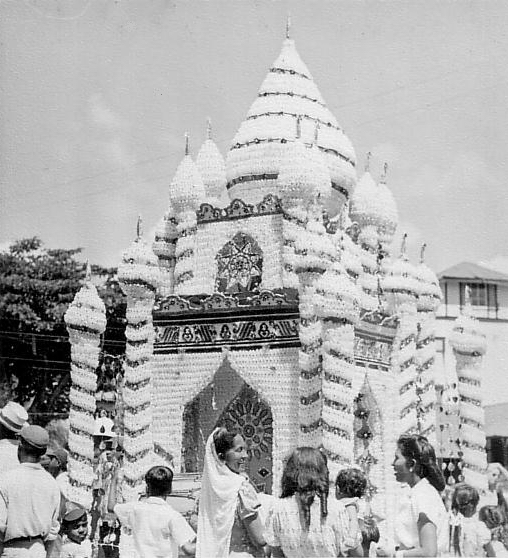
- A tadjah at Hosay celebrations in Saint James, Port of Spain, Trinidad and Tobago in the 1950s.
- Also called: Hussey, Ashura, Taziya, Tadjah
- Observed by: Shi’a and some Sunni Muslim Indo-Caribbeans in Trinidad and Tobago, Guyana, Suriname, Jamaica, and their diaspora
- Significance: Commemoration of the Battle of Karbala, in which Husayn ibn Ali, the grandson of Muhammad was slain in 680 CE
- Date: 1-10 Muharram
- Frequency: Annually
- Related to: Ashura, Mourning of Muharram, Tabuik

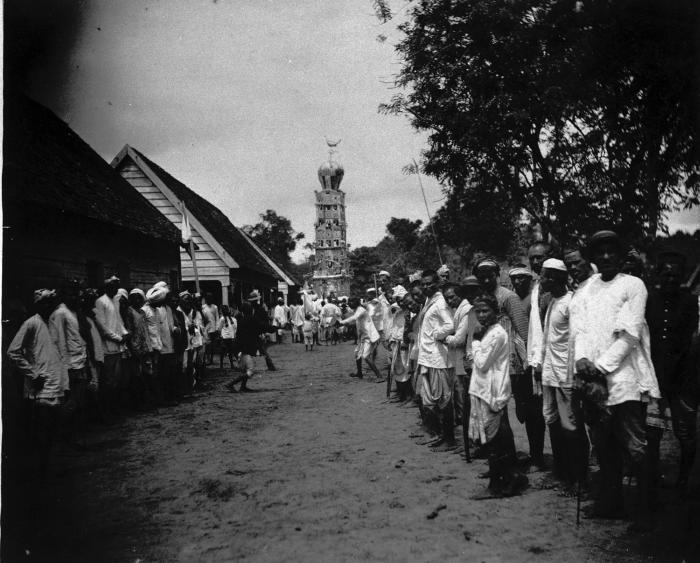
Tadjah festival on a plantation in Suriname, circa 1890

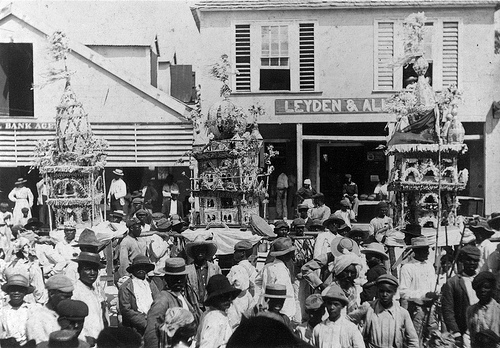
A historic Ashura celebration in Jamaica, which is known locally as Hussay or Hosay.

Hosay (originally from Husayn) is a Shia Muslim Indo-Caribbean commemoration that is popularly observed in Trinidad and Tobago, Jamaica and other Caribbean countries. In Trinidad and Tobago, multi-coloured model mausoleums or mosque-shaped model tombs known as tadjah are used to display the symbolic part of this commemoration. They are built and paraded, then ritually taken to the sea on last day of observance, and finally discarded into the water. The word tadjah derived from the Arabic word تعزية taʿziya and signifies different cultural meanings depending on the region, time period, occasion, and religion. In Guyana, and Suriname, the festival is called taziya or in Caribbean Hindustani tadjah in reference to these floats, arguably the most visible and decorative element of this festival.

Generally, Hosay lasts for ten days and is observed in accordance with the Islamic lunar calendar and in line with ten days of Ashura commemorated by Shia Muslims throughout the world. The last four days are the most popular as the first six days are days of fasting, prayer and building of the "Tadjahs" and "Moons". Although Hosay was traditionally commemorated for Husain and was a Shi'a festival, its celebration in recent times has adopted all types of shades and characters from Sunni Islam and other religions including Hinduism, Christianity, Rastafari, Afro-American religions, and Kejawèn, making the modern event a mixture of different cultures and religions. The event is attended by both Muslims and non-Muslims, depicting an environment of mutual respect and tolerance. A unique design of tadja can be found during the Hosay celebrations in Cedros, a coastal village situated in the southwestern end of Trinidad, that are built in an exclusive style that is not found anywhere else in the world, in terms of the art and style of construction. In nineteenth-century Trinidad newspapers as well as government reports derogatorily called Hosay the "Coolie Carnival."

== Origins ==
The Hosay or Husay (derived from Husayn or Hussein) commemoration is a Caribbean manifestation of the Shia Muslim Remembrance of Muharram in Trinidad and Tobago and Jamaica. The name Hosay comes from "Husayn" who was assassinated by Yazid in Karbala. This martyrdom is commemorated in the festival. In Trinidad and Tobago it is primarily celebrated in Saint James, in northwestern Trinidad and in Cedros in southwestern Trinidad. Recently it has been revived elsewhere. In Jamaica, it was brought by East Indians who came to the island as indentured servants after the abolition of slavery. It is celebrated throughout the island. In the past, every plantation in each parish celebrated Hosay. Today it has been called an Indian carnival and is perhaps most well known in Clarendon where it is celebrated each August. People of all religions attend the event.

In the 1850s, very elaborately decorated models of mosques made of paper and tinsel called tadjahs were carried through the streets to the accompaniment of constant drumming. Small fires were lit in the gutters beside the streets over which the drumskins were heated to tighten the skins of the tassa drums. Mock stick fights celebrate the martyrdom of Husayn ibn Ali. The festival lasts three days ending with the throwing of the tadjahs into the sea at sunset on the third day. Although Hosay is a religious event for Shias, all of Trinidad's religious and ethnic communities participate in it, and it has become accepted as part of the national culture.

The Remembrance of Muharram was continued to the Caribbean by Muslim Indian indentured labourers and other migrant laborers from India. The observance of Hosay in Trinidad is traced back to 1854. The celebrations encouraged social interactions and were a rare opportunity to cross color lines where those of Indian origin could mingle with those of African, Amerindian, Chinese or other backgrounds.

== Oppression ==
In the 1880s the British colonial authorities became increasingly concerned about public gatherings, and in 1884 issued an ordinance to prevent the public Hosay commemorations. Thousands of workers, who had spent the year building their tadjahs joined a Hindu named Sookhoo, in petitioning the government to allow the festival per their agreement with the Governor, who was visiting London during this episode. When all appeals were ignored by the Protector of Immigrants, through ignorance of the new July 1884 prohibition, defiance, or both, the tadjahs were taken onto the streets at the appointed time, and in order of the estates. The first estate that took its tadjah onto the street had earned that right over the past months, and in some towns, Hosay went ahead. In Saint James, Port of Spain the police did not interfere, but in Mon Repos, San Fernando, on Thursday, 30 October, 1884, buckshot was fired into the crowds of women, children and men. After shots were fired by the police to disperse the procession, 22 "Indians" were killed immediately. Later, 120 were found with injuries, some of whom had run into the cane fields to hide during the police attack. That day is commonly referred to in Trinidad history as the Muhammad Massacre by Indians and as the Hosay Riots in British and colonial records.

== Gallery ==
Pictures of a Modern Hosay in Cedros, Trinidad
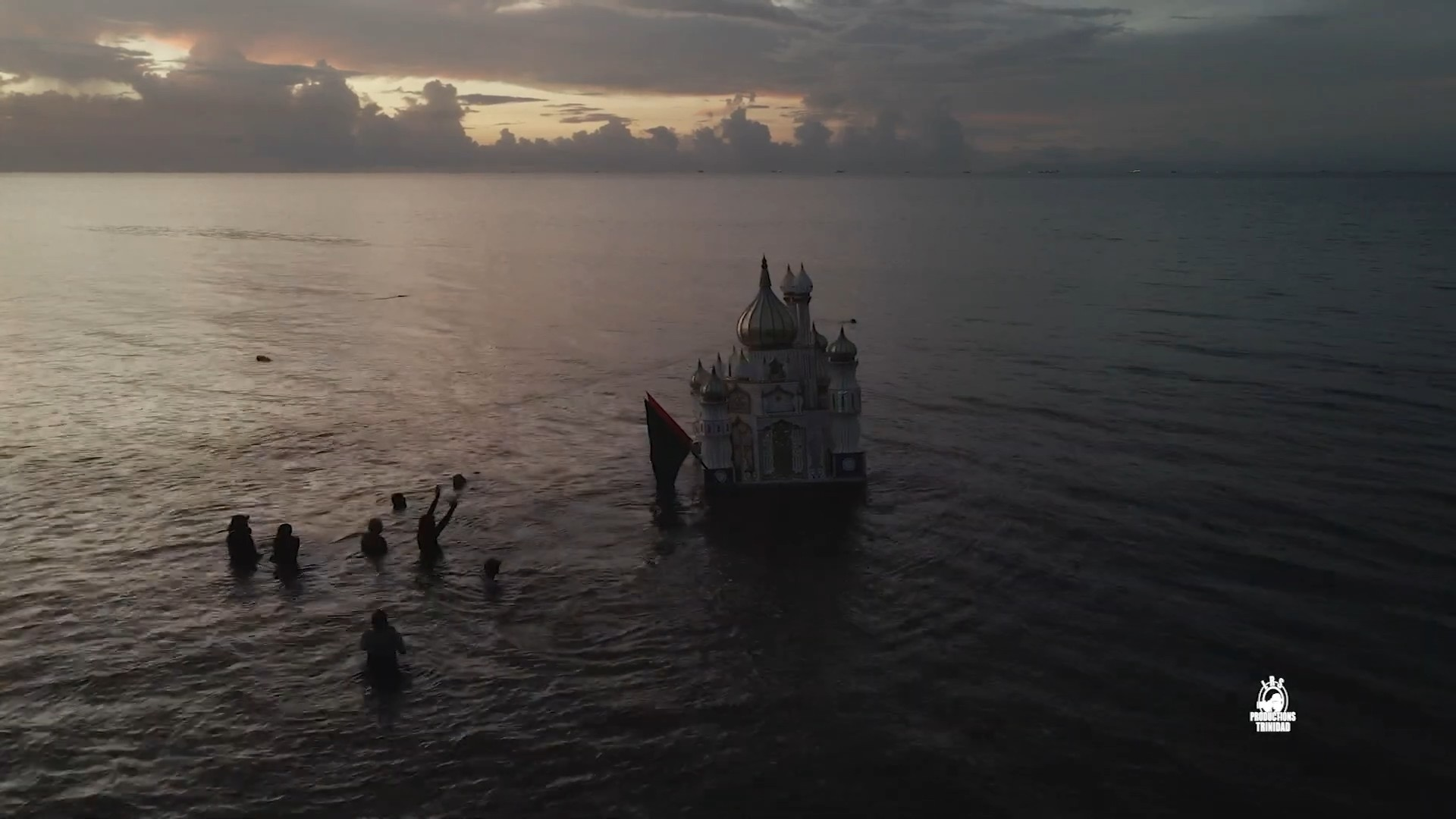
Tadjah in the ocean

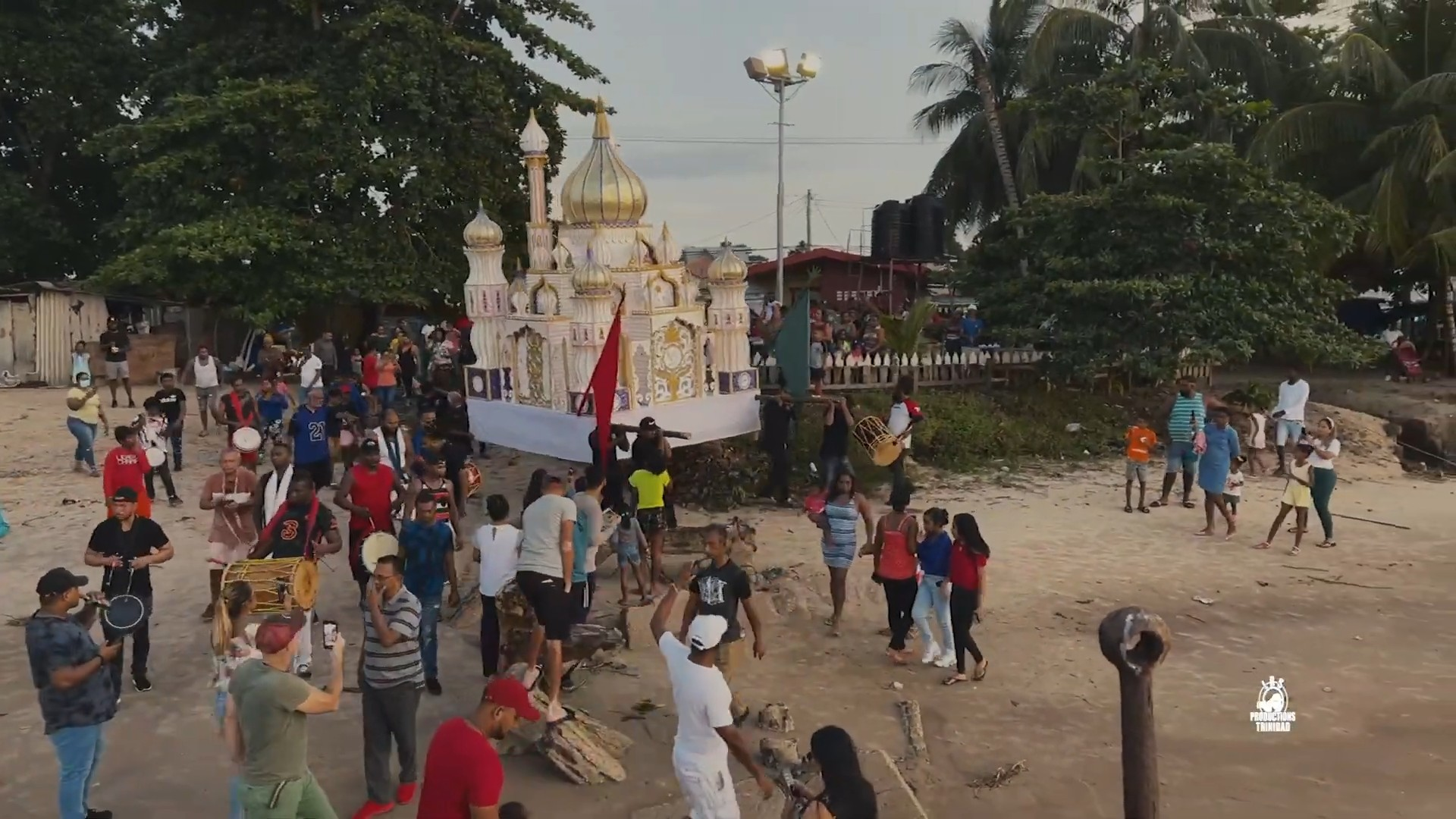
Tadjah being moved onto the beach to put it in the ocean

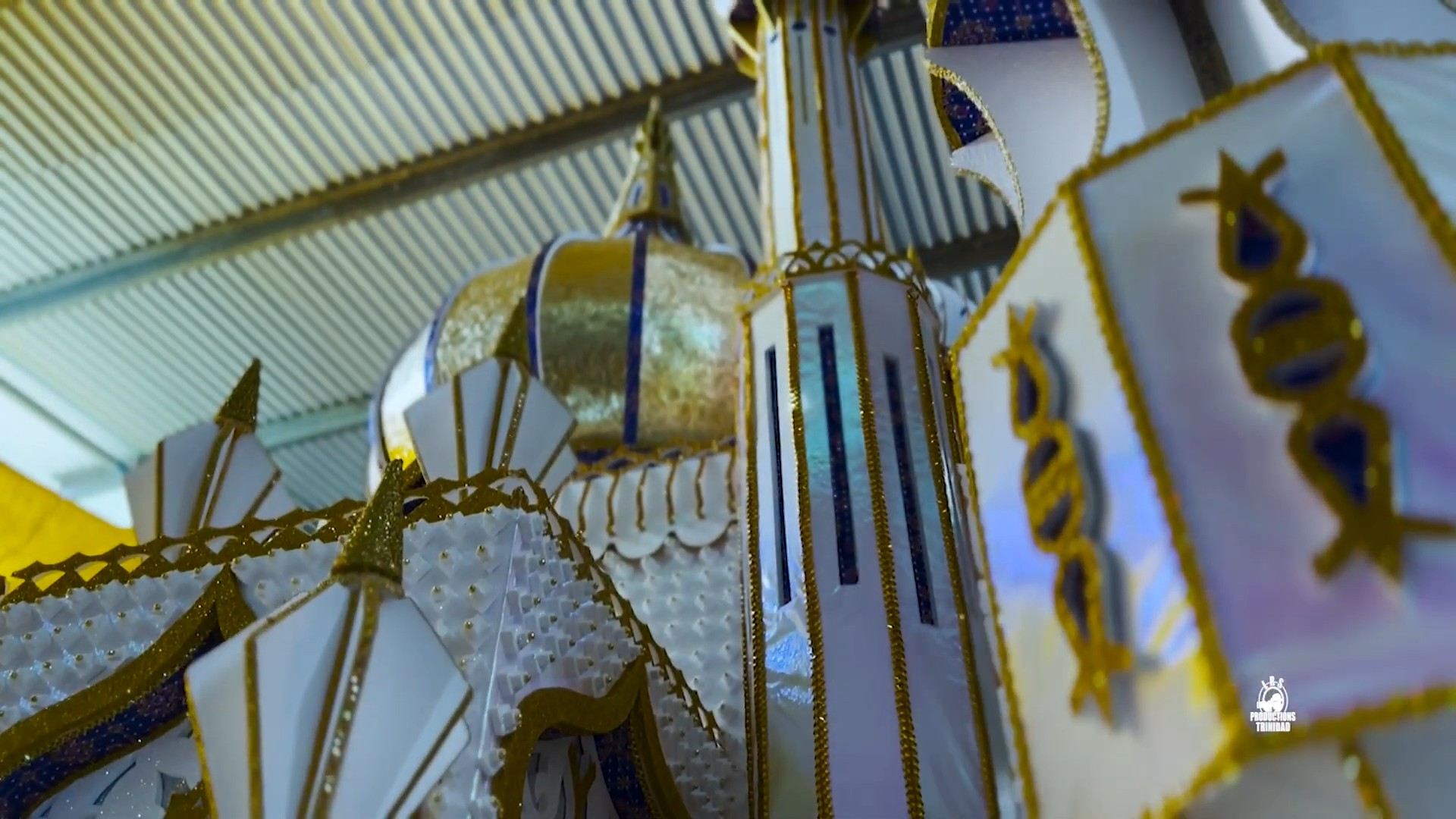
Tadjah in progress/construction

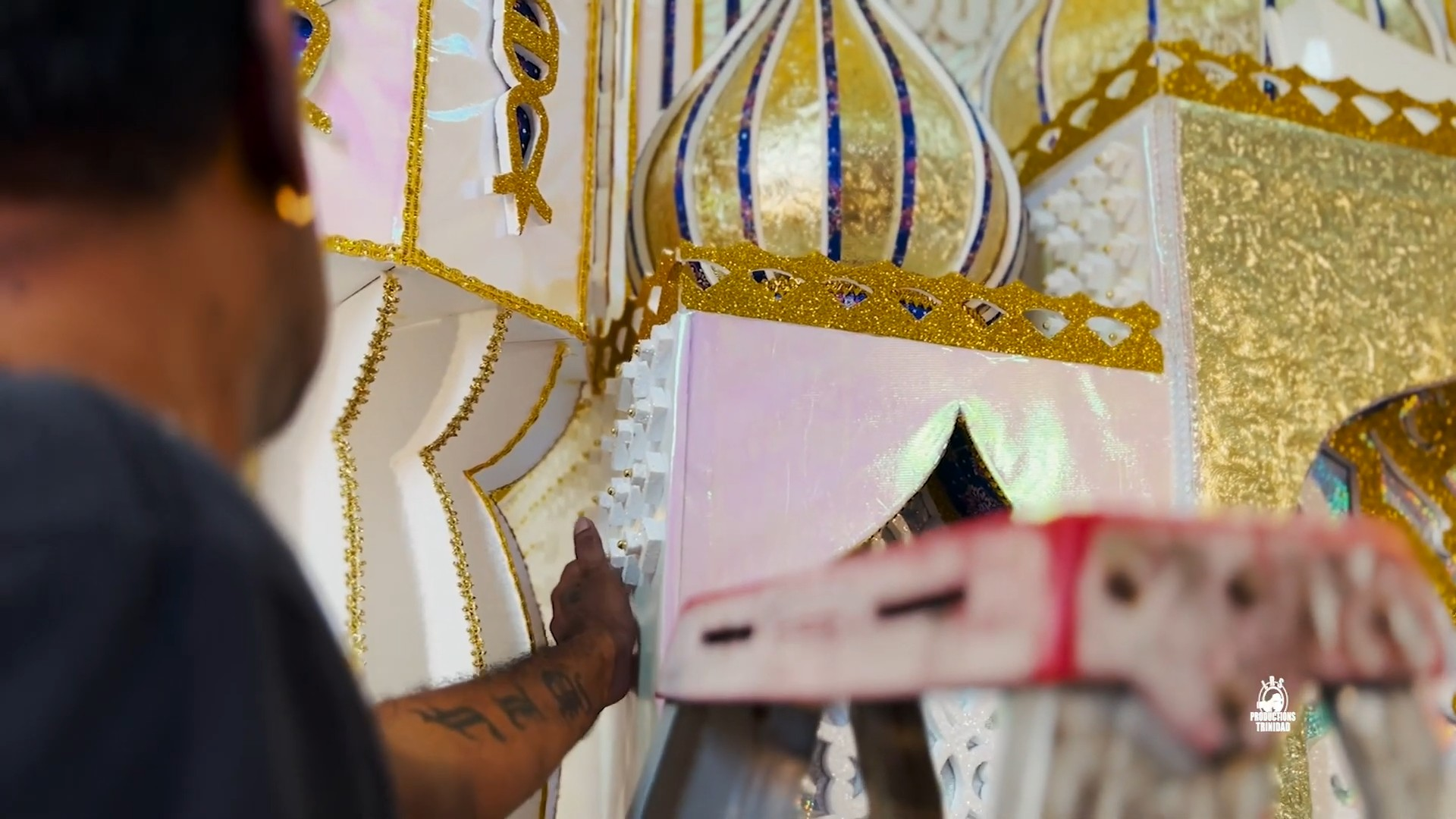
Man touching a Tadjah in progress for Hosay

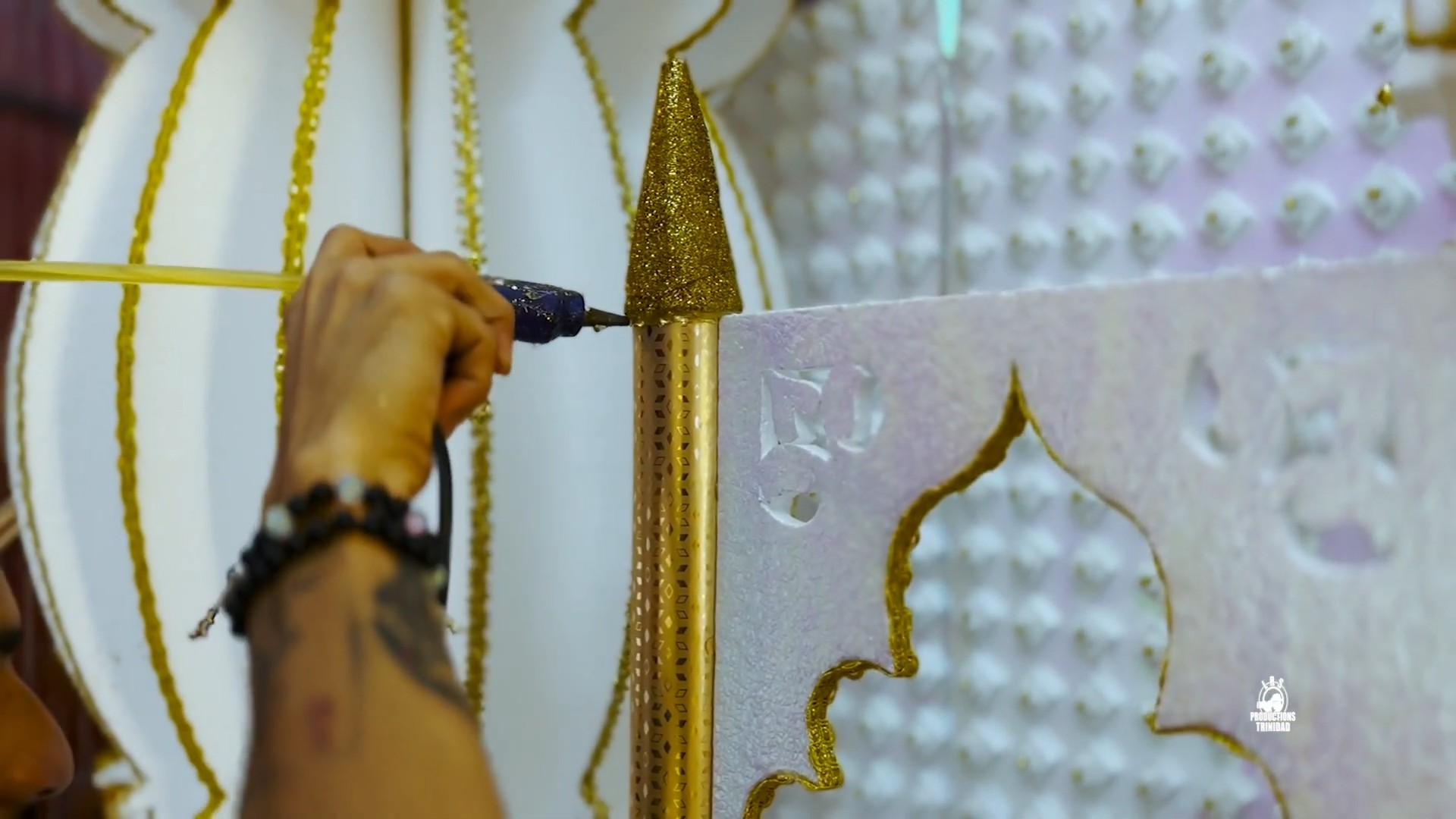
Man working on Tadjah for Hosay

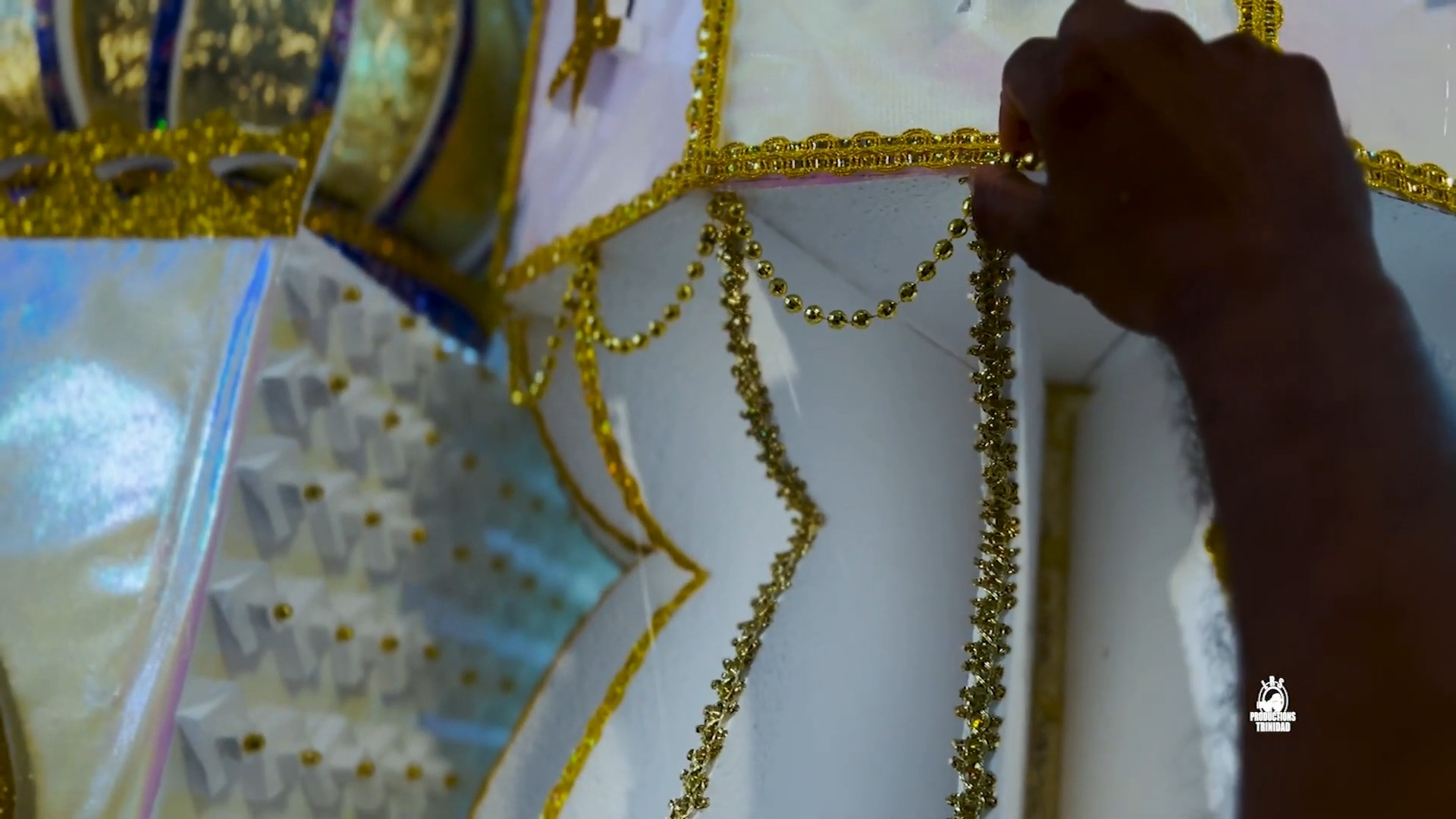
Man putting beads on a Tadjah

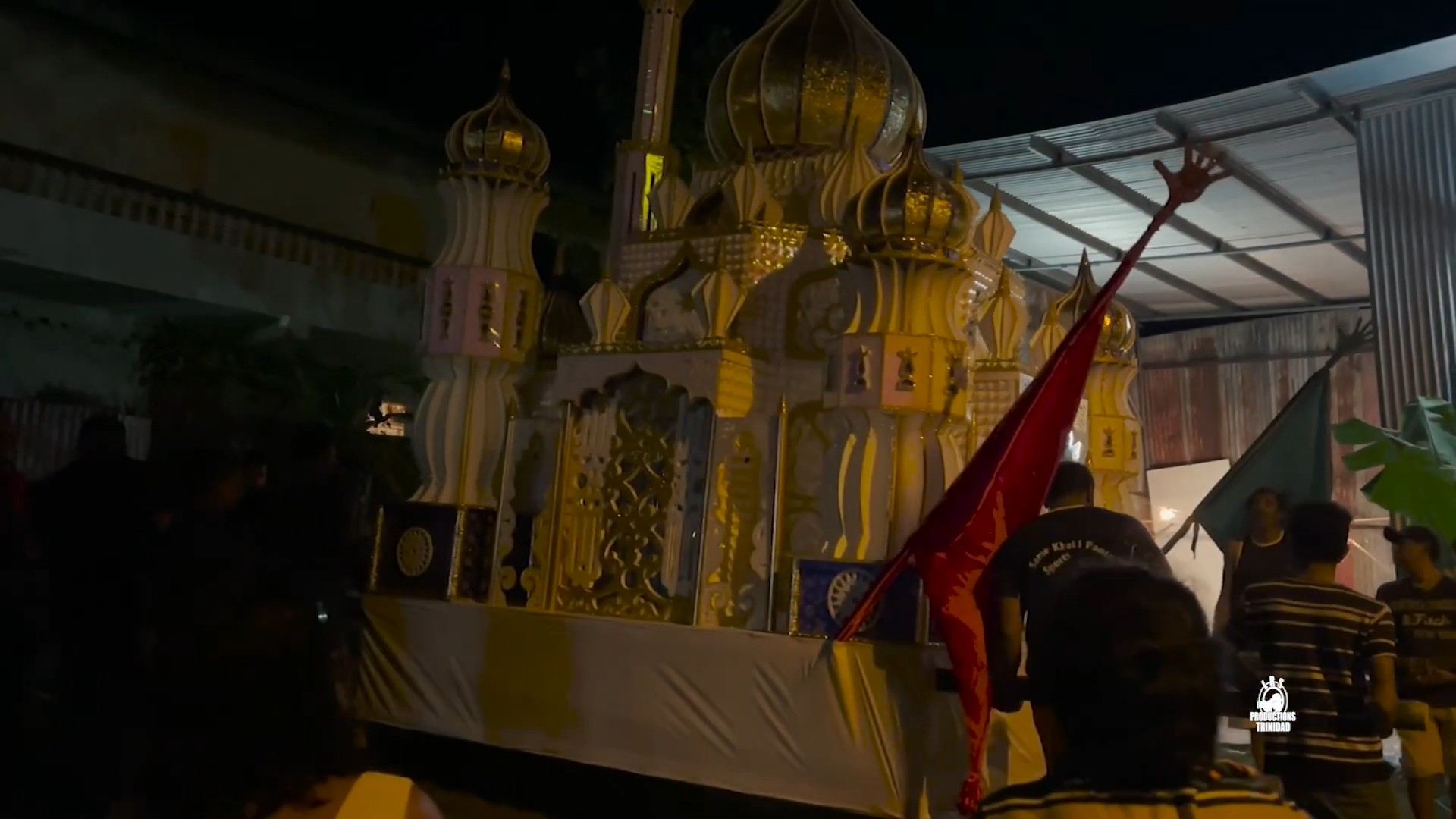
Tadjah being moved out of the building it was built in

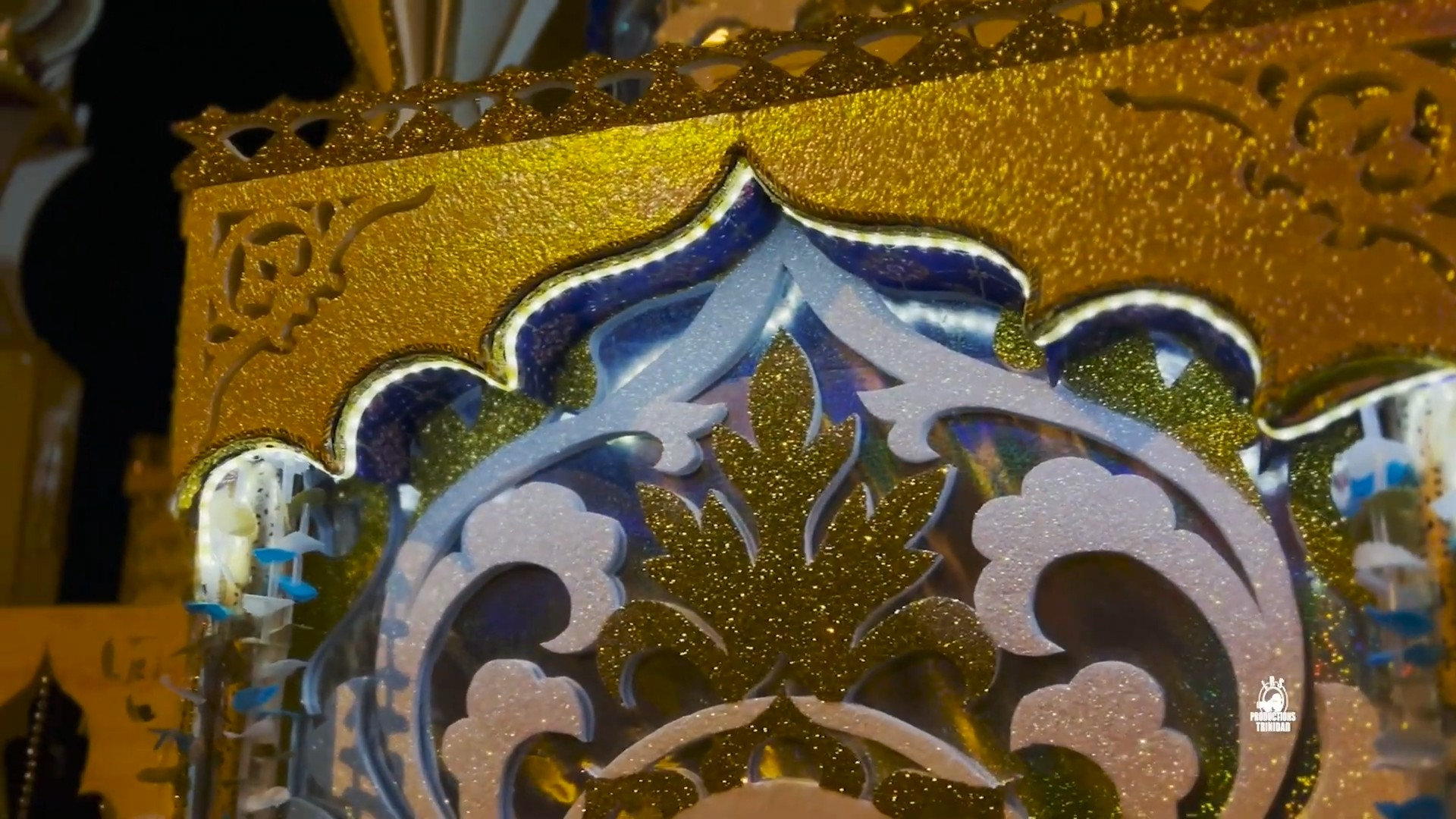
Close up of the front of a Tadjah

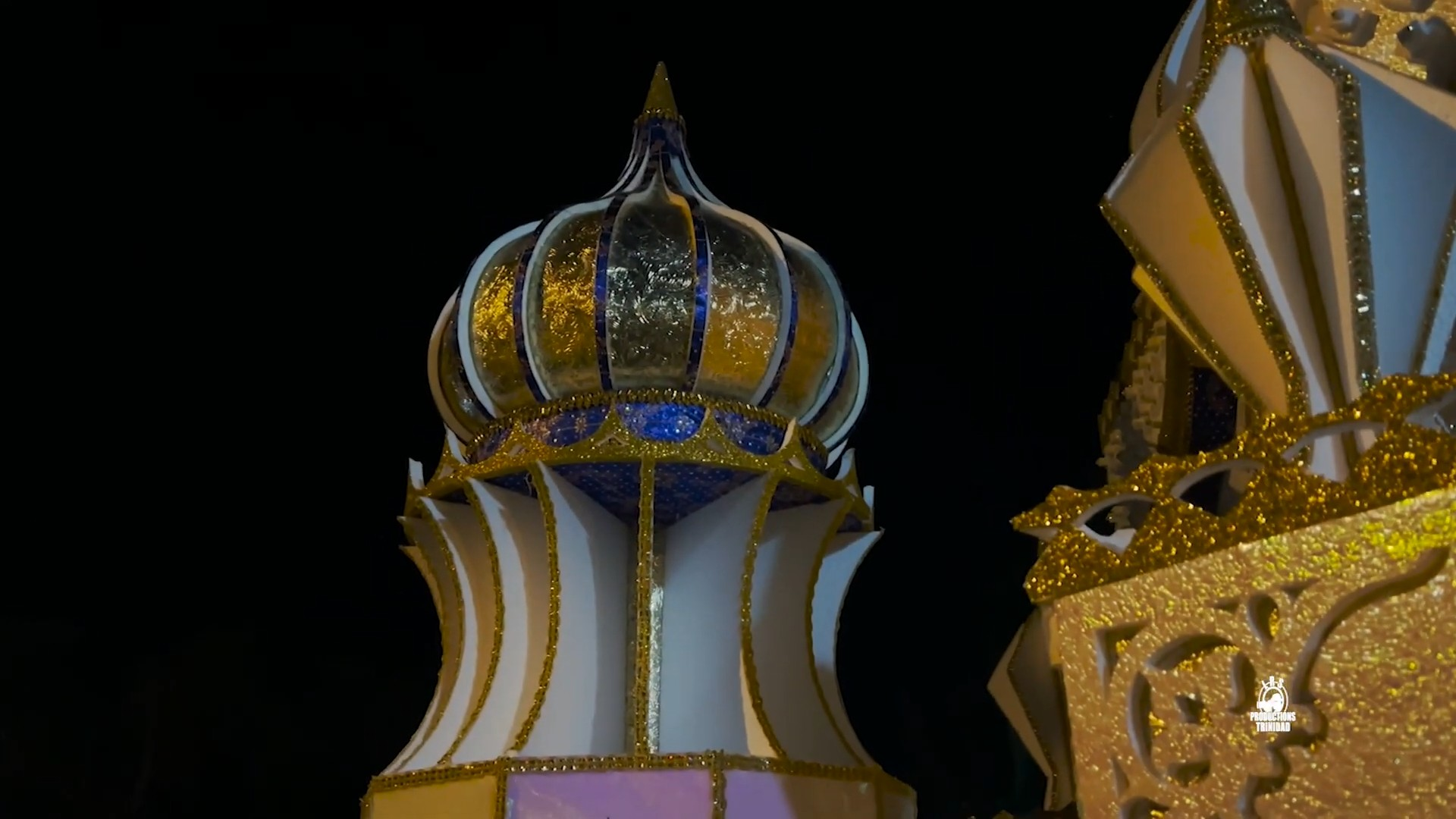
Minaret (?) of a Tadjah

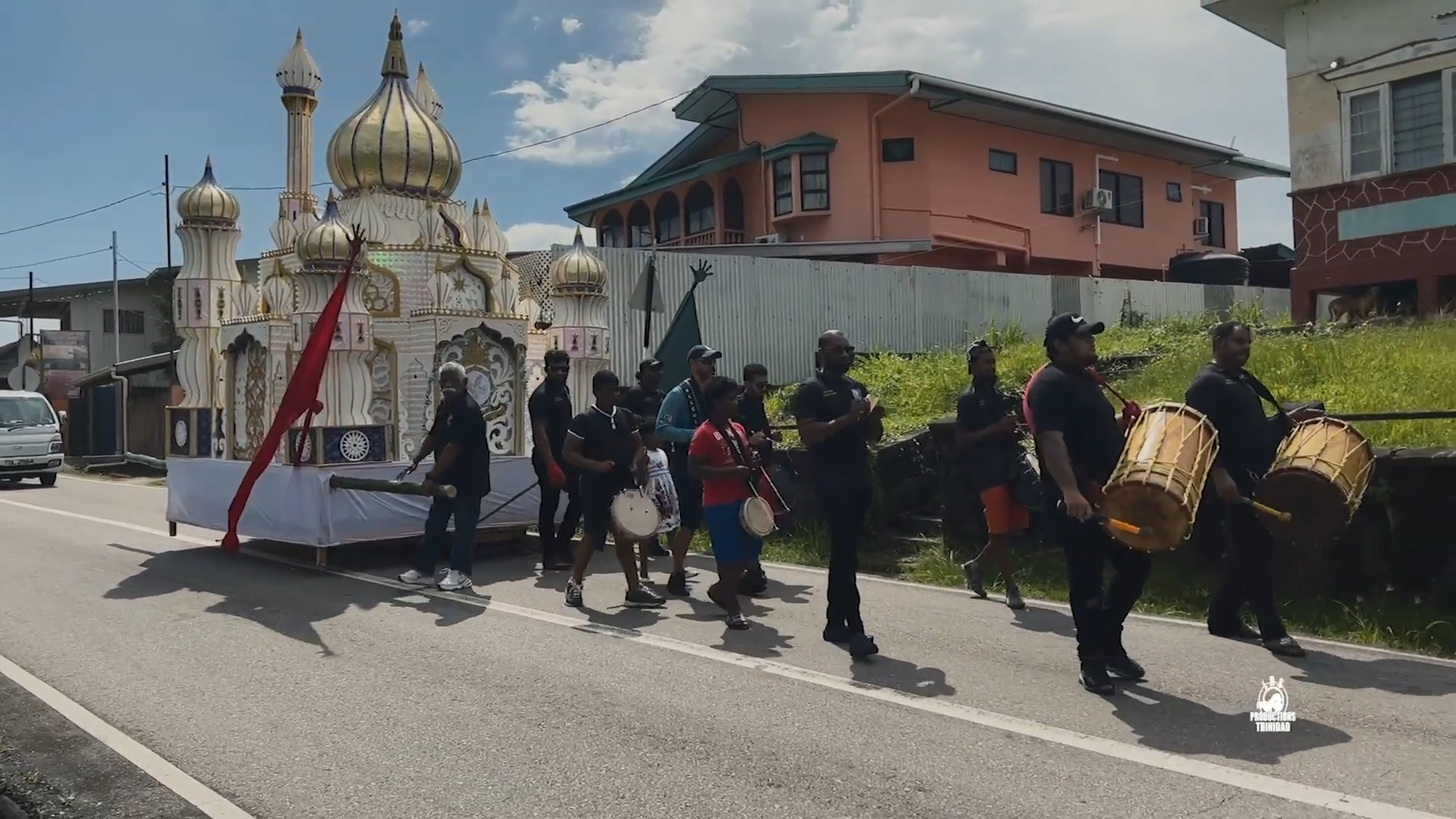
Tadjah being carried on a road

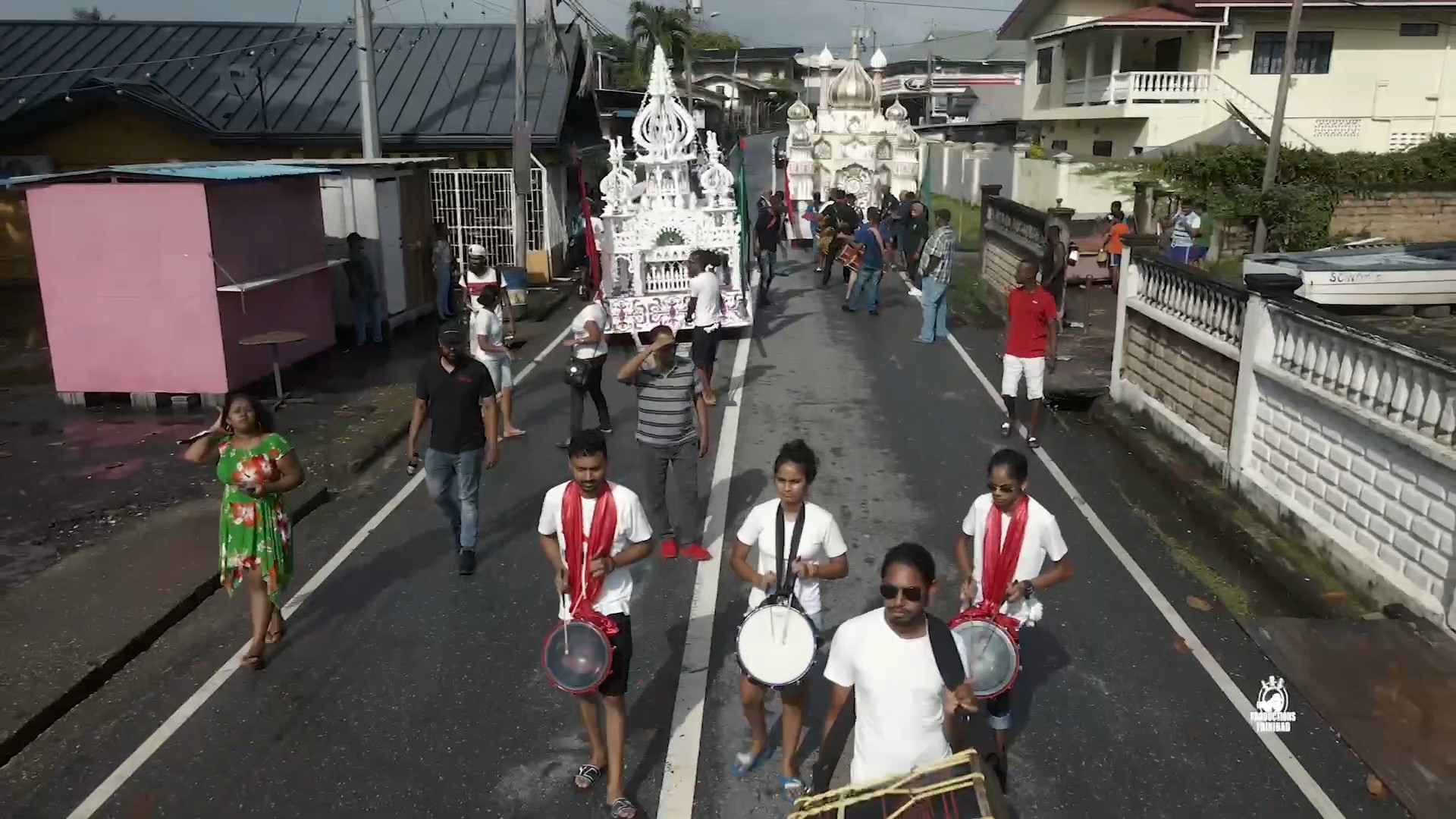
2 Tadjah being moved on a road

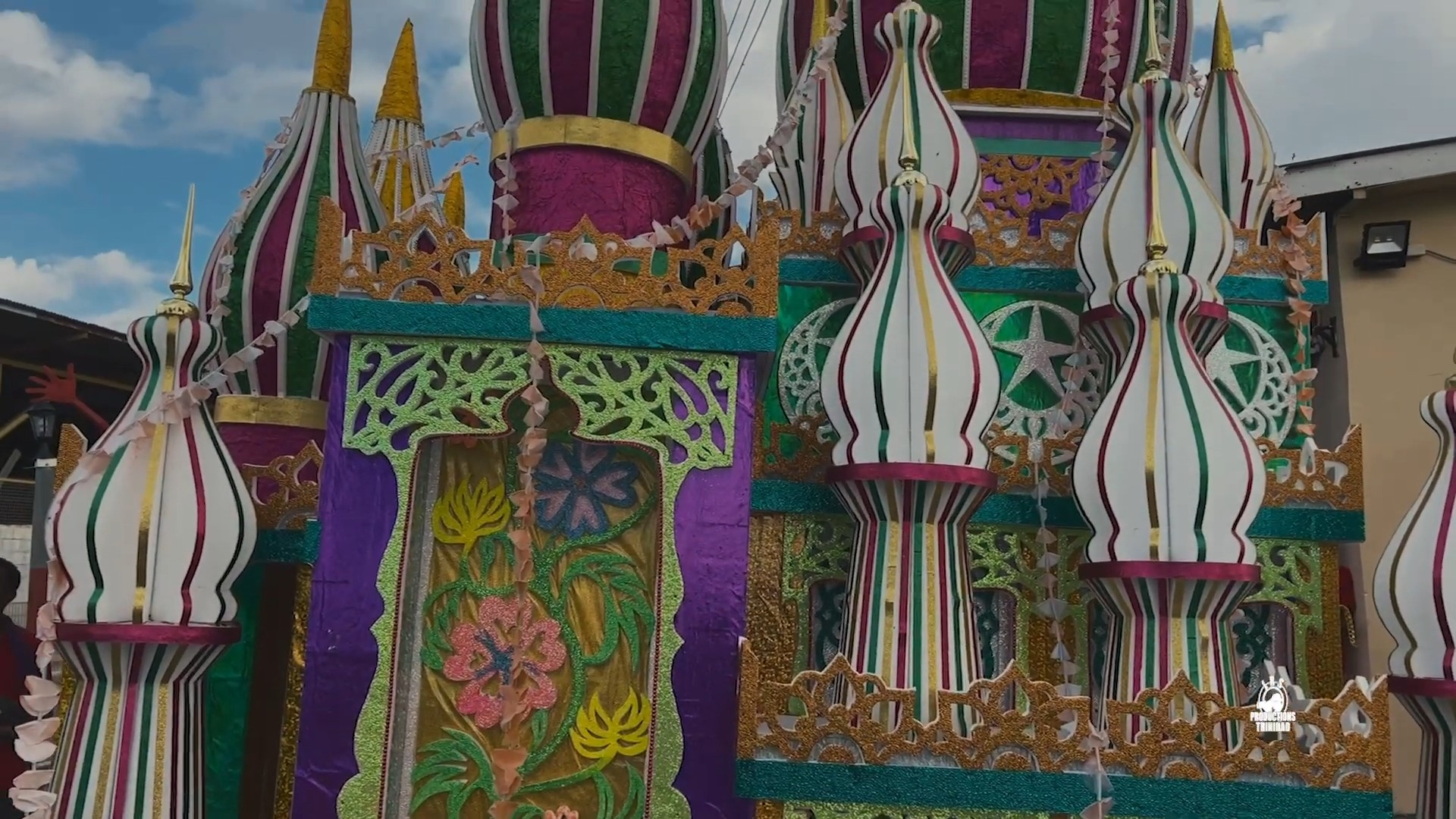
Colorful Tadjah

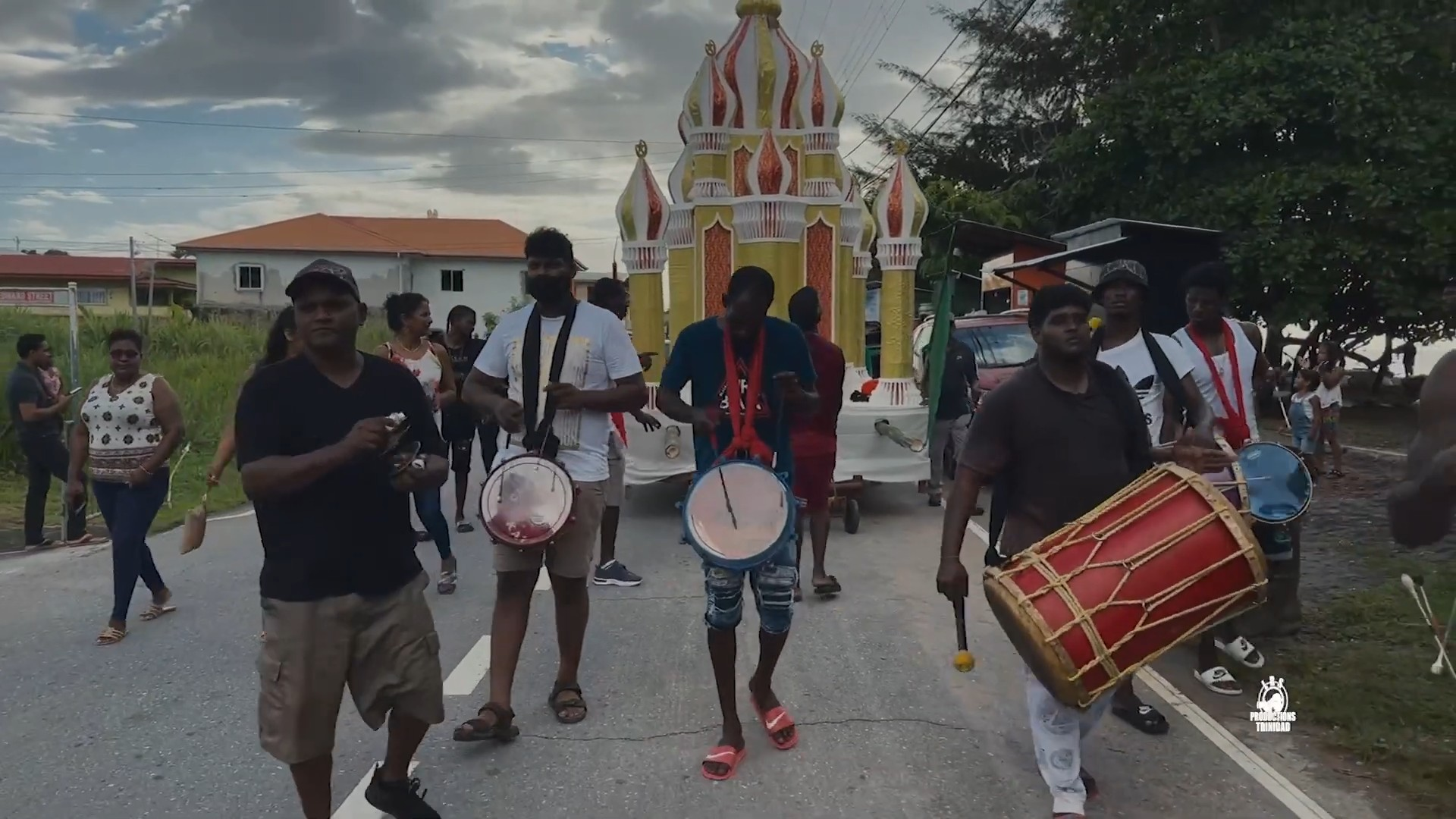
Yellow, Gold and Red Tadjah being moved on a road

== See also ==
- Culture of Trinidad and Tobago
- Islam in Trinidad and Tobago
- Islam in Guyana
- Islam in Suriname
- Islam in Jamaica
- Mourning of Muharram
- Tabuik
- Rawda Khwani

== Footnotes ==
- Mendes, John. 1986. Cote ce Cote la: Trinidad & Tobago Dictionary. Arima, Trinidad.
