= Islam in Suriname =

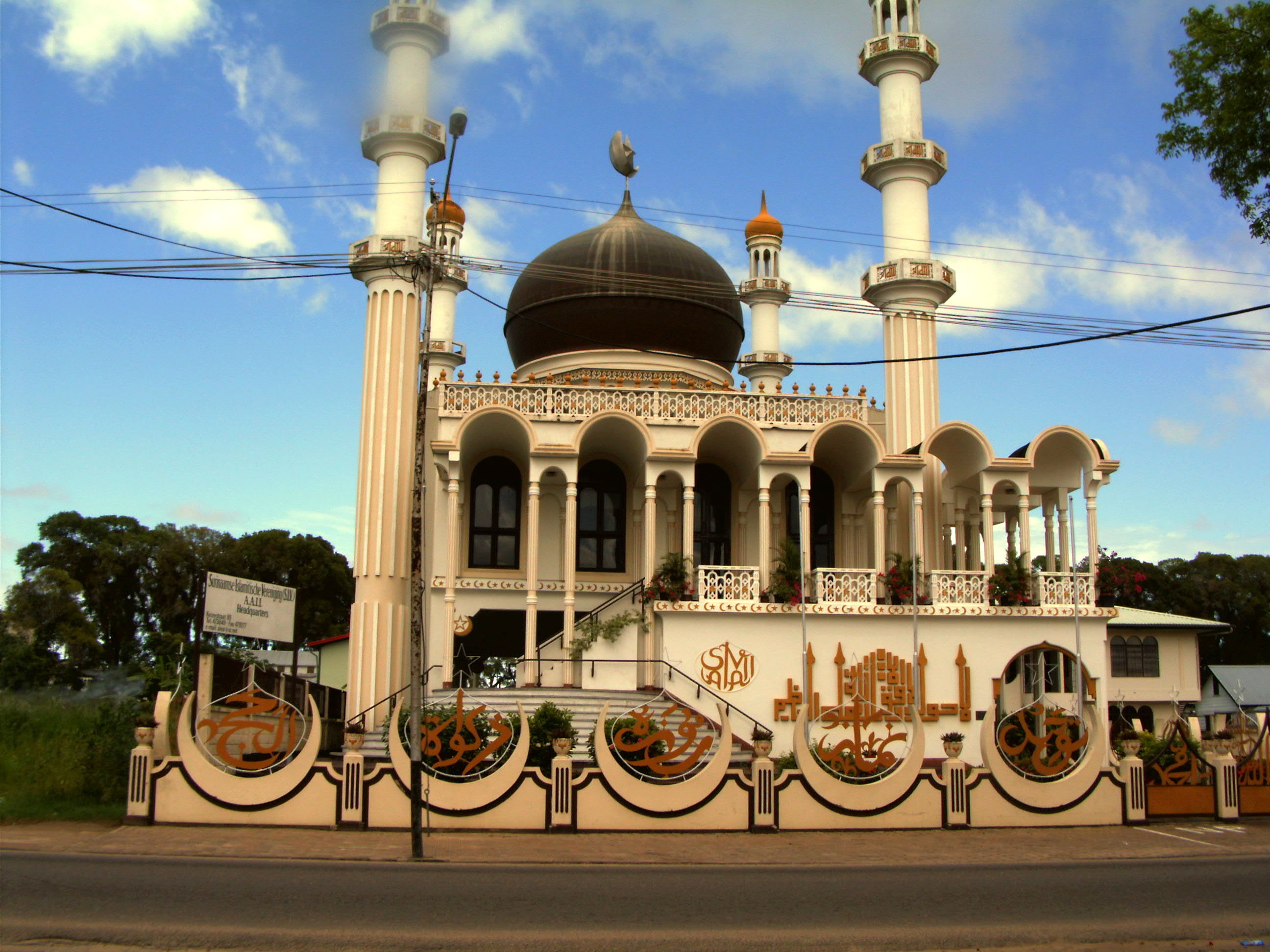
- Mosque Keizerstraat in Paramaribo

Total population
- 13,9% of the total population in 2012

Regions with significant populations
- Commewijne · Nickerie · Wanica · Saramacca

Religions
- Sunni Islam · Ahmadiya (including the Lahore Ahmadiyya Movement) · Other Muslim

Languages
- Arabic (liturgical language); Surinamese Dutch · Surinamese-Javanese · Sarnami Hindustani

Related ethnic groups
- Dutch Muslims · Guyanese Muslims · Trinidadian and Tobagonian Muslims · Jamaican Muslims · Antillian Muslims

Islam is the third-largest religion in Suriname, representing 13.9% of the country's total population as of 2012, which is the highest percentage of Muslims in the Americas. The majority of Surinamese Muslims belong to the Sunni branch of Islam.

Some speculate that Muslims first came to Suriname as slaves from West Africa and then were converted to Christianity over time, even though there is little proof for these speculations. The ancestors of the actual Muslim population came to the country as indentured laborers from the British Raj and Dutch East Indies, from whom today most Muslims in Suriname are descended.

The forms of Islam in Suriname are strongly influenced by the culture of the regions of origin: South Asia (India, Pakistan and Afghanistan) and Indonesia (Java). Apart from descent, most Surinamese Muslims also share the same culture and speak the same languages.

== East-west divide ==
The first Javanese Muslims to come to Suriname built their mosques facing west as they did in Java. It was only until contact with Hindustani Muslims in the 1930s that people realized that Mecca is east of Suriname. This created a divide between Muslims who prayed to the east (wong ngadep ngetan) and west (wong ngadep ngulon). The east-worshipping Muslims were more orthodox in their religion, whereas those who worshipped to the west were Javanese and clung more to their traditional Javanese culture.

== Demographics ==
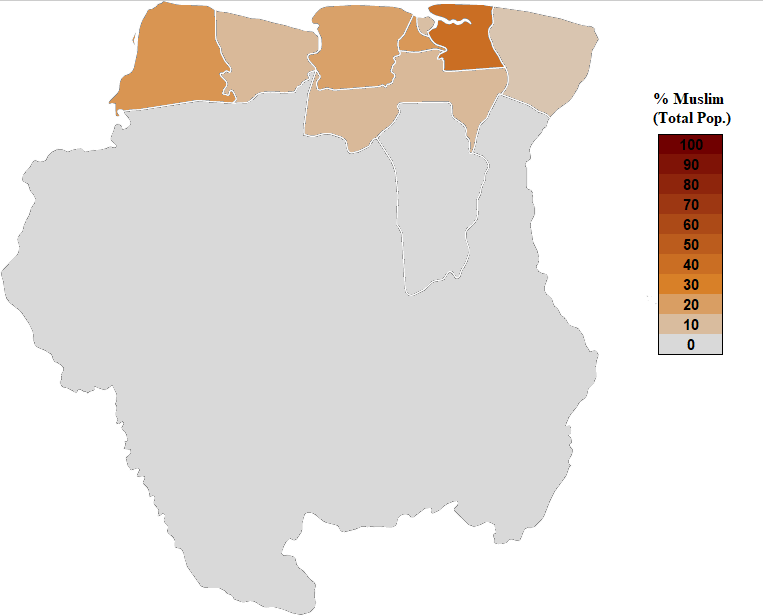
Distribution of Muslims in Suriname (2004)

There are 75,053 Muslims in Suriname, according to the 2012 census. This number is up from 66,307 Muslims in 2004. The share of Muslims of Indo-Surinamese descent decreased from 17% to 13% in the same period (-4%), mainly because of emigration to the Netherlands and declining fertility rates. The share of Muslims among Maroon people doubled from 0.1% to 0.2%.

Year	Suriname (population)	Muslim population	Share (%)
1964	324,893	63,809	19.6%
1971	379,607	74,170	19.5%
1980	355,240	69,713	19.6%
2004	492,829	66,307	13.5%
2012	541,638	75,053	13.9%

=== Ethnic groups ===
Islam is the main religion among Javanese Surinamese people (67%) and the second largest religion among Indo-Surinamese people (13%) and multiracial people (8%).

Islam by ethnic group as of 2012
Ethnic group	Population	Muslims	%
Javanese Surinamese	73,975	49,533	67.0%
Indo-Surinamese	148,443	18,734	12.6%
Multiracial people	72,340	5,471	7.6%
All Afro-Surinamese	206,423	621	0.3%
Amerindians	20,344	138	0.7%
Chinese Surinamese	7,885	112	1.4%
White Surinamese	1,665	32	1.9%
Others and indefinable	10,561	412	3.9%

=== Geographical distribution ===
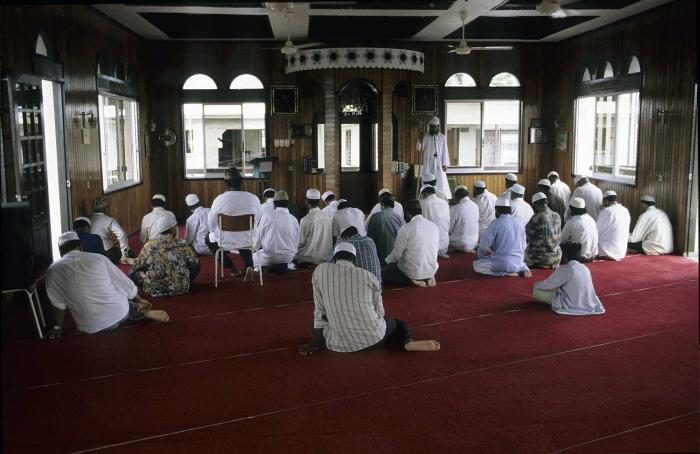
Mosque in Paramaribo

Commewijne District has the highest share of Muslims (mostly Javanese Surinamese), followed by Nickerie District and Wanica District (mostly Indo-Surinamese).

Share of Muslims by district according to 2004 Census
District	Percent of Muslims
Commewijne District	40.4%
Nickerie	22.5%
Wanica	21.7%
Saramacca	18.8%
Para	11.3%
Coronie	11.0%
Paramaribo	9.4%
Marowijne	6.8%
Brokopondo	0.2%
Sipaliwini	0.1%
Suriname	13.5%

== Muslim World ==
Suriname (since 1996) and Guyana (since 1998) are the only countries in the Americas which are member states of the Organisation of Islamic Cooperation.

== Notable Muslims ==
- Rashied Doekhi, politician
- Iding Soemita, politician
- Paul Somohardjo, politician
- Janey Tetary, indentured labourer, rebellion leader and resistance fighter

== See also ==
- Latin American Muslims
- Latino Muslims
- Islam in Guyana
- Religion in Suriname
- Hinduism in Suriname
- Organisation of Islamic Cooperation
