= Milly Swan Price =

Former black indentured servant in Tennessee (c. 1824 – c. 1880)

- Born: Milly Swan c. 1824
- Died: 1880 (aged 56)
- Spouse: Bob Price (m. 1855; died 1860) George W. Dean (m. 1871)
- Children: Roxana Swan (born 1844), Harriet Price (stepchild via Bob Price)

Milly Swan Price (born Milly Swan; c. 1824 – c. 1880) was a black indentured servant until she gained her freedom at the age of twenty-two. Milly was indentured when she was sixteen along with her seven siblings. They were indentured to Ellen C. "Nelly" Newman, the great niece of James Madison.

After she was freed, Milly became a property owner in Memphis, Tennessee before marrying Bob Price until his death in 1860. Milly then married George W. Dean and faded from her more public activities. She continued buying and selling property until her death around 1880.

== Biography ==
=== Early life ===
There is little documentation of Milly Swan's early childhood. Her birth year is recorded as 1824, but there is no recorded month or day. Her father's identity is unknown, but it is possible that he was a slave owned by the Newman family. At the age of sixteen, Milly was indentured to Ellen C. Newman along with her seven siblings, eighteen year old Nick, seven year old Jim, three year old brother Addison, twelve year old Peggy, eleven year old Charity, four year old Kitty, and one year old Sally Ann. Tipton County Court records show that Milly's mother, Anna Swan, indentured her children to Newman on March 2, 1840. No reason was given for why the children were removed from her care. Each of the children was to remain indentured to Newman until their twenty-first birthdays.

=== Marriage and children ===
While she was still indentured to Ellen Newman, Milly Swan gave birth to Roxana Swan on November 15, 1844. In August of that same year, the indenture of Milly and her siblings had been reaffirmed by the court. Possibly due to her pregnancy, Milly remained with the Newmans for an extra year, leaving in 1846. She registered herself and her daughter Roxana, fourteen months old at the time, as free persons of color in the Shelby County Court in Tennessee on February 2, 1846. Because Milly Swan was a free person of color at the time of Roxana's birth and children follow the condition of their mother, Roxana was able to be registered as a free child of color, as noted by the country clerk.

In 1850, Milly emancipated a slave she owned, Harriet Price. She then emancipated Harriet's father, Bob Price, in 1853. Bob and Milly legally married on January 2, 1855 following several purchases of property in his name. They operated Bear Creek Farm on Linden Avenue. Prior to his death in 1860, Bob Price drafted his will, which included furniture, glassware, kitchenware, livestock, wagons, and a carriage to be divided between Milly and Harriet. An 1860 census valued Milly Swan Price's property at $12,000 following Bob's death, and her widow's portion amounted to over $2,000 in land, livestock, and household items. Harriet fell ill after Bob's passing and continued to live with Milly, who took care of her at Bear Creek Farm, until her uncle, John Green, removed her from Milly's care. It is unclear as to whether or not this was a forced removal or a voluntary one. Harriet died on February 24, 1866. After Harriet's death, Bob Price's properties became divided between Milly, John Green, and Green's sisters. Bob's daughter, Bettie, from a relationship prior to being bought and emancipated by Milly, filed a lawsuit to gain control of her father's property. She had been left out of the will because she was a slave at the time, and could not own property. At the time of the lawsuit, Milly Swan Price had listed Anna Price as a member of her household. It is possible that Anna was the daughter of Bob and Milly, named after Milly's mother Anna, because she was listed at age thirteen and would have been born during their marriage, but before Bob's death. Bettie claimed that Bob and Milly's child had passed and was not listed at the time of Bob's death and Anna disappeared from Milly's public existence. There is no further record of Anna Price. There is no record of the result of Bettie's lawsuit.

On December 25, 1871, Milly married George W. Dean. A court case was filed against Milly for money she had collected on Bob Price's Bear Creek property following his death until the property was partitioned. A lower court ruling is not known, but the Tennessee Supreme Court ruled not to disallow Milly's owed money. However, Milly was able to earn monthly wages due to the sixty-nine months she spent caring for Harriet while she was ill.

=== Property and slave ownership ===
After the completion of her indenture, Milly Swan Price began accumulating property. Milly bought her first property in April 1846, purchasing a small lot on Linden Street in her daughter's name. She bought another lot in 1851 for $120 as repayment for a loan of $300 from Jim Williams, who could not pay her back. In the early 1850s, Milly's younger brother, either Jim or Addison, was indentured to her. In court papers, this brother is referred to as George. Milly Swan Price owned at least three slaves in the 1850s, as well as Harriet and Bob Price. It is assumed that the slaves were related to each other or to her. Prior to her marriage to Bob, Milly sold the property she bought from Jim Williams. Bob Price was listed as a seller, although because he was still a slave at the time, he could not legally claim to own the land. Once Milly and Bob married, Bob assumed control over the property Milly purchased due to coverture laws. Milly sold the Linden Street property in 1877 following claims from Memphis tax officials that she had not paid city taxes from July 1860 to July 1861.

=== Death and afterward ===
Milly Swan Price's death year is not known, but is assumed to be 1880. There was no death notice or reference to her after she sold a property in 1877. Her husband, George W. Dean, used the Bear Creek Farm as collateral in 1895 and was marked as a single man. He used the land as collateral again in 1898 and his status was then marked as widower.

== See also ==
- Coverture
- Free people of color
- Indentured servitude
