= Mahdi Mosque, Jamaica =

Mosque in Old Harbour, Saint Catherine, Jamaica

Mahdi Mosque
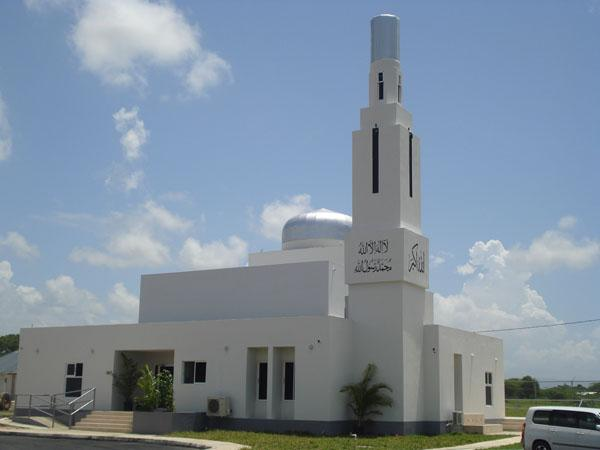

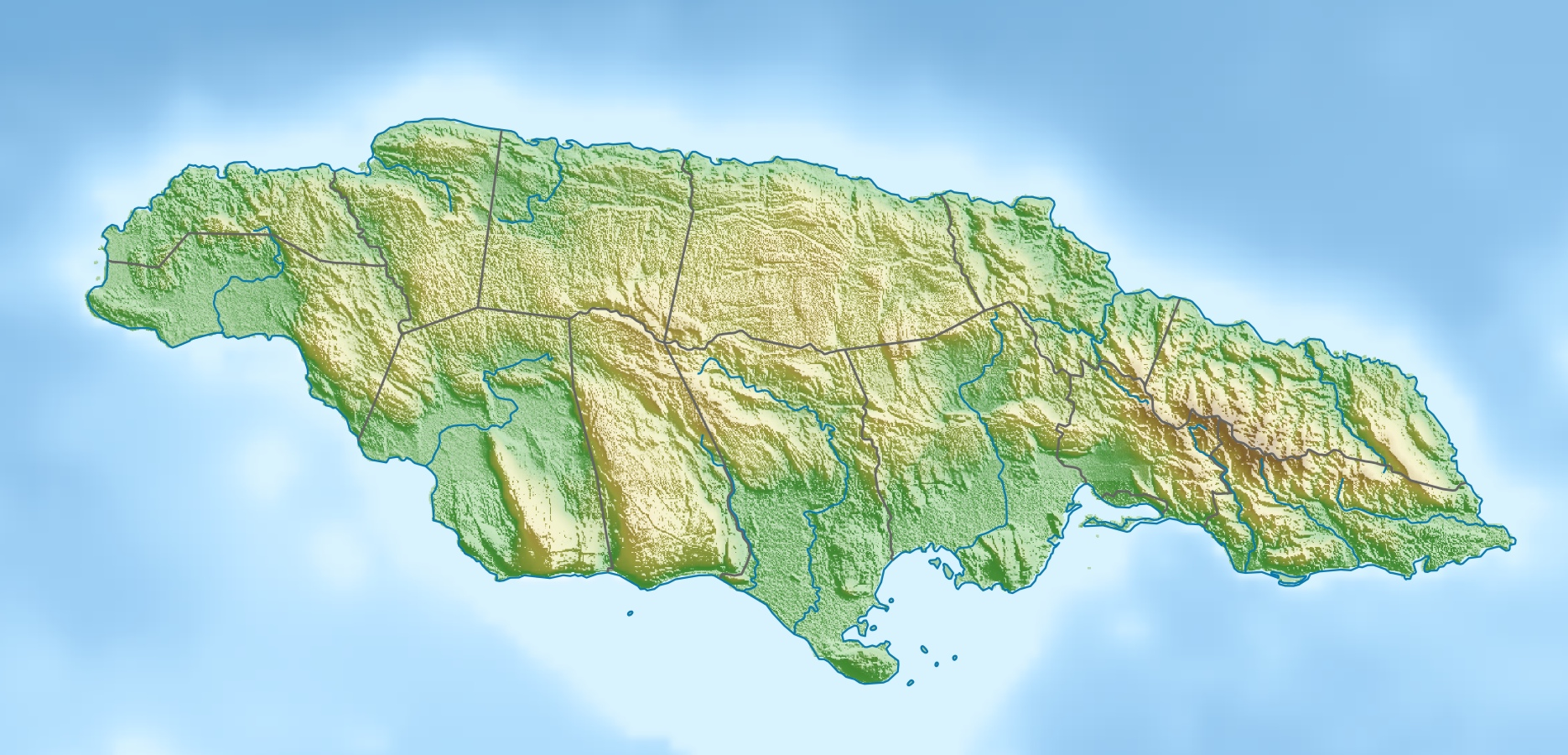
- Location of the mosque in Jamaica

Religion
- Affiliation: Ahmadiyya Islam
- Ecclesiastical or organizational status: Mosque
- Status: Active

Location
- Location: Old Harbour, Saint Catherine
- Country: Jamaica
- Interactive map of Mahdi Mosque
- Coordinates: 17°56′45″N 77°04′36″W

Architecture
- Type: Mosque
- Completed: 2011
- Minaret: 1

The Mahdi Mosque is an Ahmadiyya mosque in Old Harbour, Saint Catherine Parish, Jamaica.

== Overview ==
The mosque was built in 2011 as the first Ahmadiyya mosque in the country.

The mosque regularly hosts various conferences. Where these conferences serve as a means to moral and spiritual training of Ahmadi Muslims, these also provide guests an opportunity to learn about Islam. The mosque also regularly hosts charity events. Some activities “Back to School Giveaway”, “Annual Health Fair”, and various children programs offered free of cost. The mosque grounds are used for various sports competitions throughout the year.

== See also ==
- Lists of mosques in North America
- Islam in Jamaica
