= Hosay massacre =

The Hosay massacre (also known as the Hosay riots or the Jahaji massacre) took place on 30 October 1884 in San Fernando, Trinidad when the British colonial authorities fired on participants in the annual Hosay procession (the local name for the Shi'a Festival of Muharram) who had been banned from entering the town.

== Background ==
After the emancipation of slaves in the British Empire, the plantation owners of Trinidad were desperate for new sources of labour. In 1839 the British government began a programme of recruiting Indian labourers in Calcutta to be sent to Trinidad. They bound themselves to work as indentured labourers for a set number of years on the plantations. The mostly Hindu and Muslim labourers were required to work seven and a half hours a day, six days a week for three years, receiving about 13 cents a day for their work. At first, half of the recruits were women but, in 1840, the proportion was reduced to a third of the number of men. In 1844, the period of indenture was extended to five years with a guarantee that, if they wished, they would get a free passage home at the end of their service. In 1853 the law was again amended to allow the indentured labourers to re-indenture themselves for a second five-year term or, if they wished, to commute any portion of their contract by repayment of a proportionate part of their indenture fee.

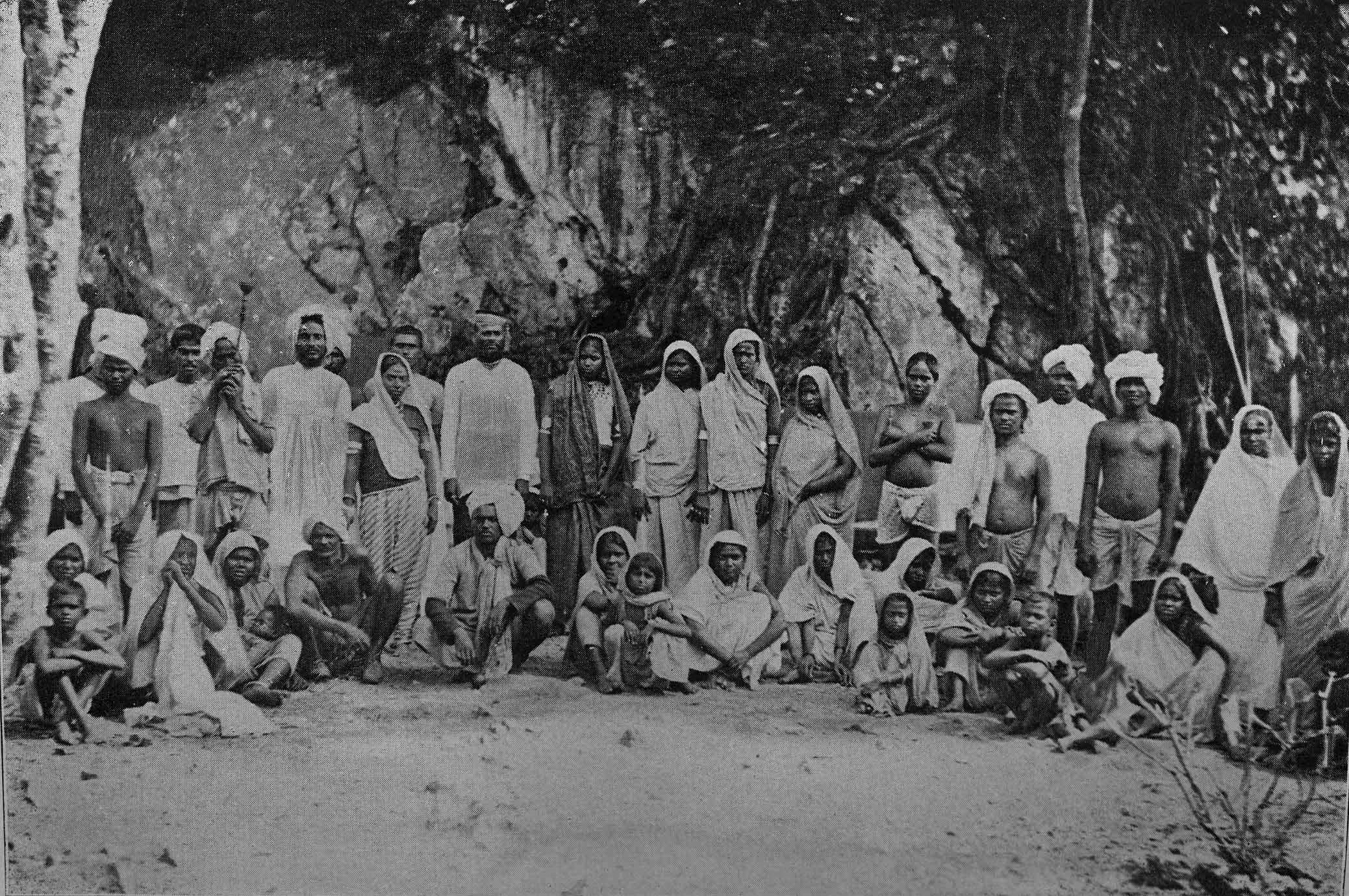
Newly arrived indentured Indians in Trinidad

Industrial unrest on the plantations was gaining momentum to be followed by a deepening depression in the sugar industry in 1884. This atmosphere was also fuelled by frequent strikes. In the previous year, met with restrictions on the use of torches, the African community celebrating ‘Canboulay’ reacted and this resulted in violence.

The decision by the authorities to prohibit the Indians from entering the towns with their processions, which began on the estates, ‘were regarded by the Indians as an arbitrary and unjust measure’. The Indians protested with a petition led by the Hindu Sookhoo and 31 others.

On 26 October Administrator John Bushe consulted the Executive Council on "the final arrangements to be made for preserving order during the Hosea." Acting Colonial Secretary, Mr. Pyne, informed the Inspector Commandant of Police, Captain Baker, instructing him on the "deployment of police, marines, from the HMS Dido, and a volunteer force." On 27 October Captain Baker personally monitored the situation. The next day Baker reported that the Indians would make no attempt to enter San Fernando. In a series of telegrams Baker attempted to avoid an armed confrontation with the Indians; however Mr. Pyne appeared bent on such a confrontation to show the Indians who was in charge. (Shantal Ramnarine)

== Events of 30 October 1884 ==
At midday the first procession of 6,000 was sighted approaching San Fernando reaching Cross Crossing about 2:30 pm and proceeded along to the entrance of Cipero Street. There the crowd was met by British troops under Major Bowles of the First North Staffordshire Regiment. The local magistrate, a Mr. Child, read the Riot Act and when the crowd failed to disperse, Child ordered the police to fire upon them. Two volleys were fired into the crowd.

At the Mon Repos Junction of the Princes Town and Circular roads the Indian crowd was also fired upon. The procession was in sight about 3:30 pm. Captain Baker gave the order to fire a single volley of bullets after the Riot Act was read.

== Death toll ==
Historian Michael Anthony reports that nine people were killed and 100 wounded at Toll Gate (on the south side of the town), while others were injured at Mon Repos (on the eastern side of the town) and at Pointe-à-Pierre Road on the north. Indian historian Prabhu P. Mohapatra suggests a higher figure of 22 dead, and over a hundred injured.

== See also ==
- History of Trinidad and Tobago
