= Queenstown Mosque =

Mosque in Georgetown, Guyana

- Location within Guyana

Religion
- Affiliation: Islam

Location
- Location: Georgetown, Guyana
- Interactive map of Queenstown Mosque
- Coordinates: 6°48′36.4″N 58°09′04.0″W

Architecture
- Type: mosque
- Established: 1895
- Demolished: 10 February 2007

Specifications
- Capacity: 1,000 worshippers
- Length: 36.5 meters
- Width: 24.5 meters
- Minaret: 2

The Queenstown (Jama) Mosque or Queenstown (Jama) Masjid is a mosque in Georgetown, Guyana.

== History ==
The mosque was originally established in 1895 by the local Afghan community. Since then, the mosque has been rebuilt three times, with the second latest building demolished on 10 February 2007 to make way for the construction of the new mosque building.

== Architecture ==
The mosque has a capacity of 1,000 worshippers. The mosque is a three-story building and has a length of 36.5 meters and width of 24.5 meters. It consists of two minarets.

== See also ==
- Islam in Guyana
