= Islam in Guyana =

Islam is the third-largest religion in Guyana, after Christianity and Hinduism, respectively. According to the 2012 census, 6.77% of the country’s population is Muslim. Islam was first introduced to Guyana via enslaved people from West Africa, but was suppressed on plantations until Muslims from British India were brought to the country as indentured labour. The current president of Guyana, Irfaan Ali, is the country's first Muslim president.

The Islamic holidays of Eid al-Adha and Mawlid are national holidays in Guyana and Hosay (Ashura), Eid al-Fitr, Shab-e-Barat, Chaand Raat, Islamic New Year, and the month of Ramadan are also widely celebrated.

== History ==
As with most South American countries, Islam spread to Guyana through the transatlantic slave trade. Mandingo and Fulani Muslims were enslaved and brought from West Africa to work on Guyana's sugar plantations. However, the oppressive conditions of slavery in the colony led the practice of Islam to essentially disappear until 1838 when 240,000 South Asians were brought from modern-day India, Pakistan and Afghanistan. Records from the time show that while overwhelming majority of these servants were Hindu, a significant minority were Muslim.

Muslim Indo-Guyanese maintained their religious identity in spite of separation from their homeland by establishing mosques, Islamic organizations, and after World War 2, seeking international support aimed at creating "a political space for colonial Muslims". By 1890, there were 29 mosques in Guyana, and 50 by 1920. Some of the earliest organizations include Queenstown Jama Masjid (founded 1895), the Young Men's Muslim Literary Society (1926) and the United Sad’r Islamic Anjuman (1949).

After Guyana's independence from the British in 1966, Guyana established diplomatic relations with Arab countries such as Egypt, Iraq and Libya who opened embassies in the capital of Georgetown. Some Muslim youths went to Saudi Arabia, Egypt and Libya to study Islamic theology and the Arabic language. In 1996, President Cheddi Jagan of Guyana toured Syria, Kuwait, Bahrain, Qatar, the United Arab Emirates and Lebanon and appointed a Middle Eastern envoy. In the same year, Guyana officially became a permanent observer in the Organisation of Islamic Cooperation (OIC).

In 1998, Guyana became the 56th full member state of the OIC. In August 2020, Dr. Mohamed Irfaan Ali became president of Guyana and first practising Muslim head of state in South America.

== Demographics ==
According to the 2012 census, approximately 6.8 percent of the population is Muslim (a total of 50,572 people). Almost all of the Muslims are of Indian descent, however there are a few Afro-Guyanese converts. The Muslim population is declining due to emigration.

Year	Guyana (population)	Muslim population	Share (%)
1980 Census	759,567	66,122	8.7%
1991 Census	723,673	57,669	8.0%
2002 Census	751,223	54,554	7.3%
2012 Census	746,955	50,572	6.8%

=== Geographical distribution ===
Essequibo Islands-West Demerara has the highest share of Muslims with nearly 12%, followed by East Berbice-Corentyne with 10% and Mahaica-Berbice with 9%.

No.	Governorate	Population (2012)	Muslims	%
1	Barima-Waini	27,643	70	0.3%
2	Pomeroon-Supenaam	46,810	3,201	6.8%
3	Essequibo Islands-West Demerara	107,785	12,688	11.8%
4	Demerara-Mahaica	311,563	18,702	6.0%
5	Mahaica-Berbice	49,820	4,494	9.0%
6	East Berbice-Corentyne	109,652	10,448	9.5%
7	Cuyuni-Mazaruni	18,375	350	1.9%
8	Potaro-Siparuni	11,077	67	0.6%
9	Upper Takutu-Upper Essequibo	24,238	135	0.6%
10	Upper Demerara-Berbice	39,992	417	1.0%
	Guyana	746,955	50,572	6.8%

=== Ahmadiyy Community ===
The first Ahmadiyya missionary to Guyana arrived in 1908. A community was established in the country in the 1960s and has several mosques across the country including Georgetown, Rosignol, New Amsterdam and Sisters Village. This reform movement, founded in British India in the late nineteenth century, also has converts of the Afro-Guyanese community.

== Interfaith cooperation ==
According to Guyanese-American professor Raymond Chickrie, Hindus and Muslims in Guyana have always had "a cordial relationship among themselves. It would seem that these two groups had come to a mutual understanding of respecting each other's space while culturally and even linguistically identifying with each other."

Among the Indo-Guyanese community, there is a tacit agreement to refrain from proselytizing between Muslims and Hindus. Guyanese Hindustani, Hindi, and Urdu is popular among Indo-Guyanese Muslims who watch films and listen to music from Bollywood. Political antagonism between Indo-Guyanese Muslims and Hindus is virtually non-existent, in contrast to India or other Indian diasporic communities such as Fiji. Intermarriage is perceived as a "tolerated deviance" rather than facing outright condemnation, as both are seen as being from the same Indian culture. However, marriage between people of the same religion and ethnicity is still preferred among Indo-Guyanese. In smaller villages, Hindus and Muslims come together to participate in each other's ceremonies.

== Organizations ==
=== Central Islamic Organization of Guyana ===
The Central Islamic Organization of Guyana (CIOG) is the largest Islamic group in Guyana. They are involved in relief work and orphan sponsorships.

=== Guyana Islamic Trust ===
The Guyana Islamic Trust (GIT) is a multi-faceted, nonprofit organization which has been established since 1978. The GIT has dedicated itself to the process of bringing about intellectual, moral and spiritual improvement to individuals, families and communities in Guyana. Their goal is education, since they believe "ignorance is the root cause of the intolerance, racism, immorality and criminality that pervades our society and our world." The Guyana Islamic Trust manages its grass root work through fourteen Administrative Districts. Some of GIT's works include organizing classes, social activities, and youth programs, as well as partnering with Jamaats, and da’wah to Non-Muslims.

The National Islamic Sisters Association (NISA) is the women's arm of the GIT and focuses on women's faith-based and social needs.

=== Guyana United Sad’r Islamic Anjuman ===
The Guyana United Sad’r Islamic Anjuman (GUSIA) was founded in June 1973. It manages the Shaheed Girls’ Orphanage in Oleander Gardens and boys’ Orphanage in Kitty.

=== Guyana Islamic Institute ===
The Guyana Islamic Institute is an Islamic centre of learning established in 1986 for teaching Arabic Language, Qur'anic Sciences and Islamic Studies.

=== National United Halaal Authority of Guyana (NUHA) ===
The National United Halaal Authority of Guyana was established in 2011. This organisation is dedicated to the inspection and certification of Halal products and food establishments in Guyana.

== Mosques ==
- Queenstown Mosque
- Hujjatul Ulama Mosque
- Anna Catherina Mosque

== Notable Guyanese Muslims ==
- Hamilton Green, first and only Muslim Prime Minister of Guyana, as well as the first and only Muslim head of government in the Western Hemisphere
- Abdur Rahman Slade Hopkinson, writer
- Nezam Hafiz, cricketer for the United States and a victim killed in the September 11, 2001 attacks
- Assad Fudadin, cricketer for the West Indies
- Khaleel Mohammed, scholar and professor
- Irfaan Ali, current President of Guyana, first Muslim president
- Shabir Ally, imam and Islamic scholar
- Ryhaan Shah, writer

== See also ==
- Latin American Muslims
- Latino Muslims
- Islam in Suriname
- Religion in Guyana
- Hinduism in Guyana
- Organisation of Islamic Cooperation

== Sources ==
- Chickrie, Raymond (1999). "Muslims in Guyana: history, traditions, conflict and change". Journal of Muslim Minority Affairs. 19 (2): 181–195. doi:10.1080/13602009908716435.
