= Janey Tetary =

British-Indian indentured servant and resistance fighter

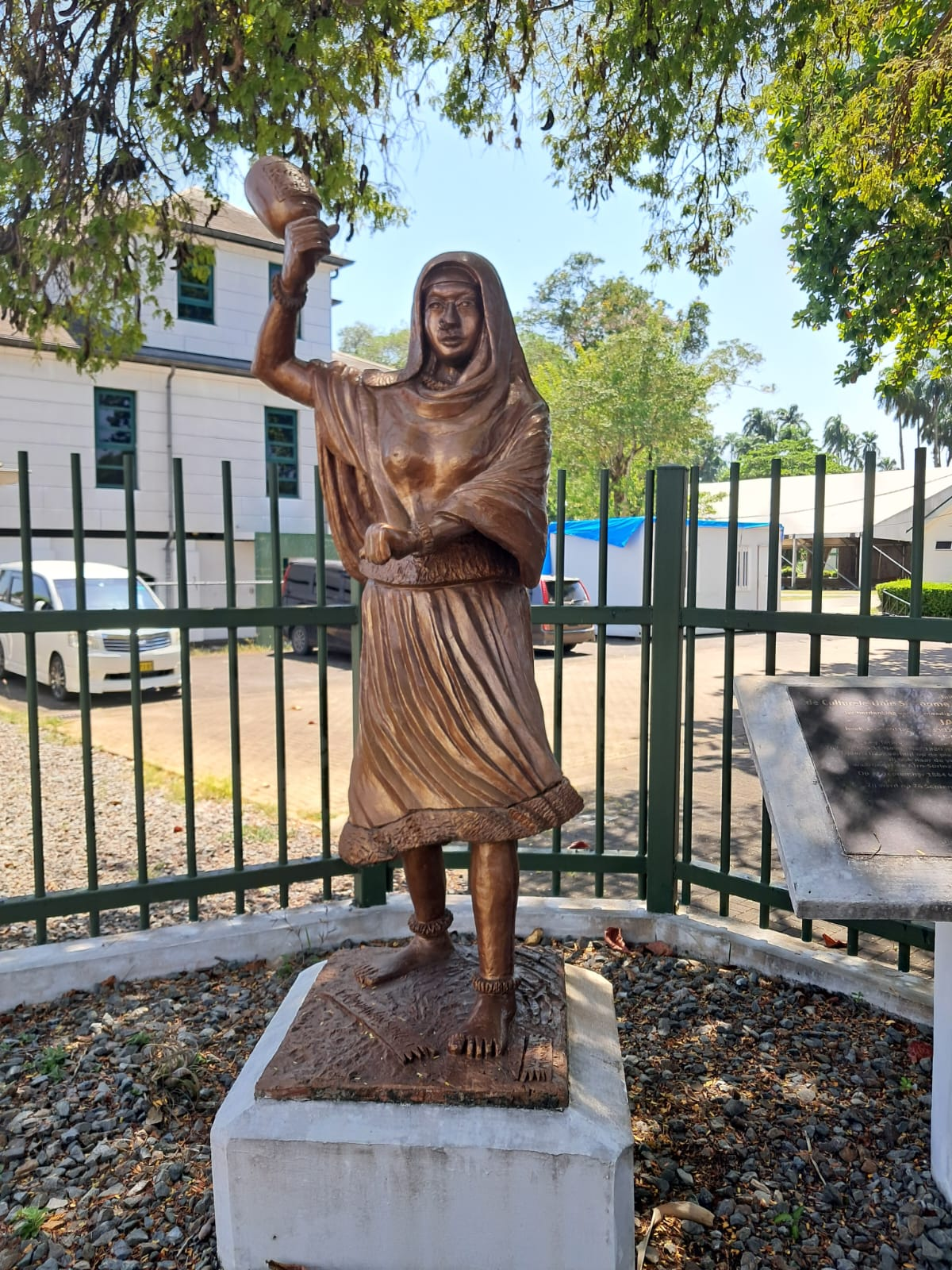
- Statue of Tetary that was erected in 2017
- Born: Tetary Begum Janey c. 1856; Patna, British India
- Died: 26 September 1884; Commewijne, Suriname

Janey Tetary (c. 1856–26 September 1884) born as Tetary Begum Janey was a Indo-Surinamese indentured labourer, rebellion leader and resistance fighter in the Dutch colony of Suriname.

== Life ==
Tetary was born in 1856 in Moniar, Patna (Former British India) and was raised as a Muslim. She was divorced at a young age and was known to defend women who had been badly treated by their husband.

On 11 September 1880, Tetary and her 10-year-old son Boodhoo signed contracts in India to labour overseas. They were indentured to Plantation Zorg en Joop near the Commewijne River in Suriname, which was under Dutch control as a plantation colony.

In 1884, Tetary lead the collective labour resistance of a group of "Hindustani" indentured servants against exploitation, after planters filed a petition to the colonial administration to change penal ordinances. They also protested about the low wages and difficult tasks they were given on the sugar plantation. When the military and police were called in to put down their rebellion, she mobilised women to fight armed with stones and bottles they had collected.

She was murdered by policemen, allegedly on the advice of the colonial official Barnet Lyon, dying from a shot to the back of her head at close range on 26 September 1884. Six other indentured labourers were also killed.

== Legacy ==
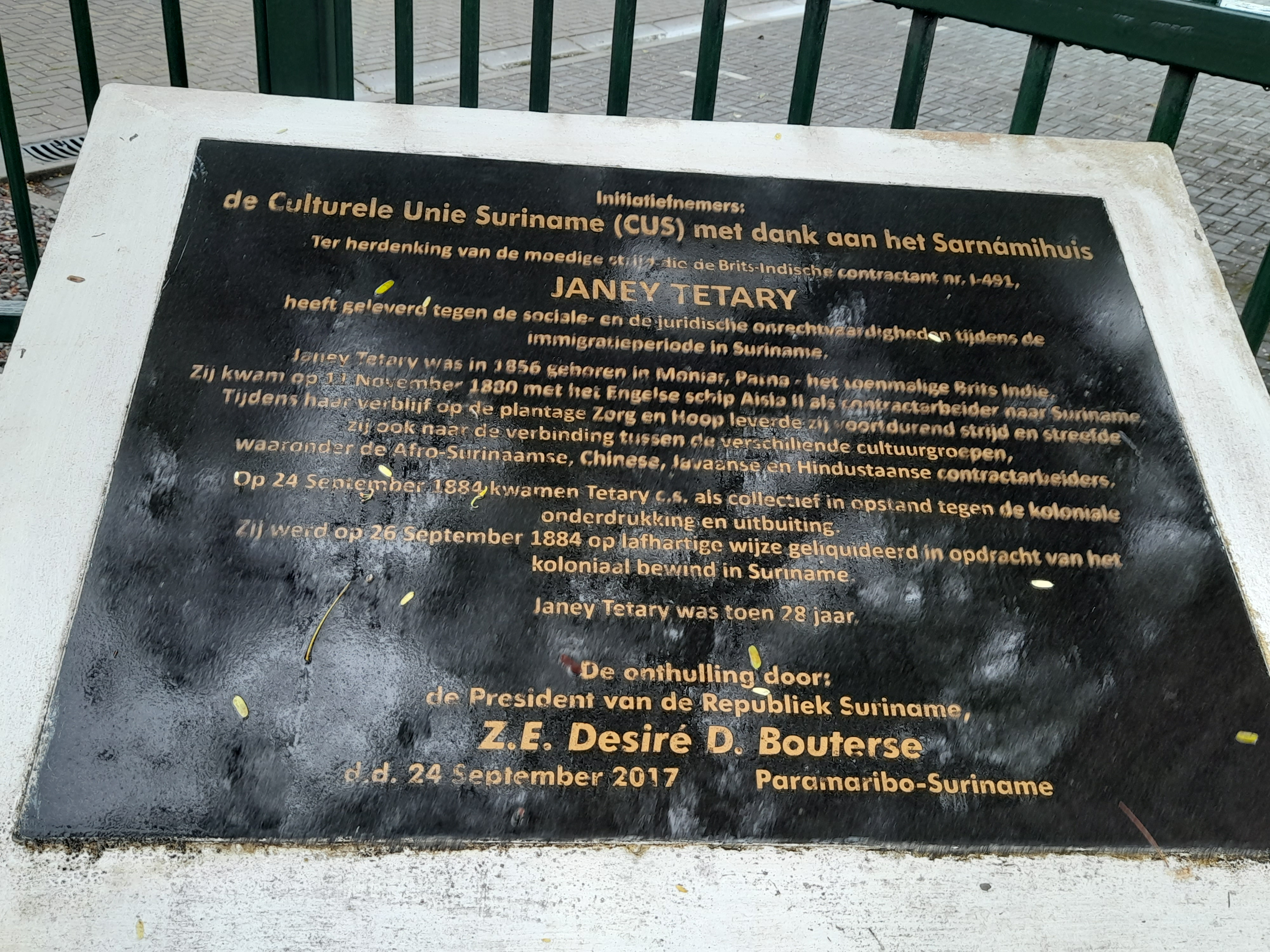
Plaque on the statue erected in 2017

In 2013, the documentary film Tetary Over strijd, moed en opoffering (Tetary, about courage, battle and sacrifice) was broadcast on Dutch television.

In 2016, Tetary's life story was featured in The Uprising music documentary which told the story of resistance against racism in the Netherlands, UK and France from a decolonial perspective.

In September 2017, a statue of Tetary, designed by George Ramjiawansingh, was placed in Paramaribo, Suriname near the President's Palace, replacing a statue of Barnet Lyon. The statue was paid for through the Tetary Must Rise crowdfunding campaign led by the artist and activist Pravini Baboeram.

In August 2019, a street in the Netherlands was named in her honour.
