= Islam in Jamaica =

Jamaican Muslims
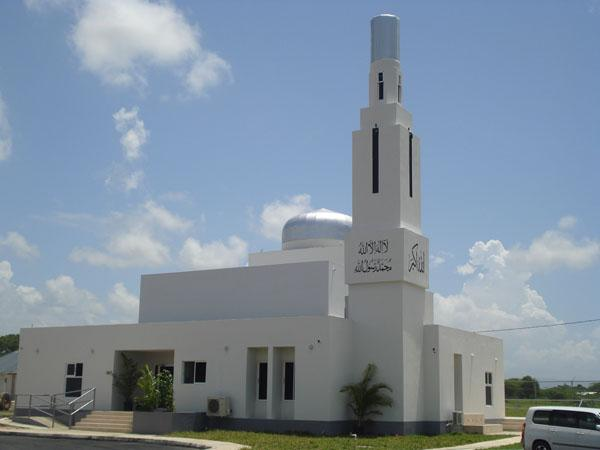
- The Mahdi Mosque belongs to the Ahmadiyya community

Total population
- 1,513

Religions
- Islam (Sunni, Shia, Ahmadiyya)

Languages
- Main Languages spoken are English, Jamaican Patois, Jamaican Hindustani, Arabic, Urdu, Sindhi, Punjabi

Jamaica is a predominantly Christian country, with Islam being a minority religion. Due to the secular nature of Jamaica's constitution, Muslims are free to proselytize and build places of worship in the country.

The first Muslims arrived in Jamaica as enslaved people. Islam was one of the main religions of Africans brought to the Caribbean and Americas. Other Muslim groups came through the indentureship program from the Indian subcontinent, and today (in a 2011 census) make up a population of about 1,513

== History ==
The first Muslims in Jamaica were West African Moors captured in the Reconquista sold as slaves to traders, and brought to Jamaica on ships. Bryan Edwards and Richard Robert Madden in their works written in the late 18th and early 19th century often wrote about the Muslim slaves of Jamaica and their situation. They wrote that many were able to memorize the Quran, declare the shahada, fasted, prayed, and some were able to write in Arabic.

Over time most of them lost their Islamic identity due to forced mixing of ethnic groups. Mu’minun of African descent belonging to the Islamic nations of Mandinka, Fula, Susu, Ashanti and Hausa ceaselessly tried to maintain their Islamic practices in secrecy, while working as slaves on the plantations in Jamaica. By the time the slaves were liberated, much of the Muslim faith of the past had faded, and the freed slaves picked up the faith of their former slave masters. Some Muslim slaves returned to Africa or traveled to other parts of Latin America while others remained in Jamaica and practiced their faith in secret. These factors led to the virtual disappearance of Islam in Jamaica outside of the Indian community.

About 16 percent of the 37,000 indentured Indian immigrants who arrived to Jamaica between 1845 and 1917 were Muslims. Muhammad Khan, who came to Jamaica in 1915 at the age of 15, built Masjid Ar-Rahman in Spanish Town in 1957, while Westmoreland's Masjid Hussein was built by Muhammad Golaub, who immigrated with his father at the age of 7. The indentured Muslims laid the foundation of the eight other masjids established in Jamaica since the 1960s, with the advent of an indigenous Jamaican Muslim community that now forms the majority of the Muslim populace on the island.

== Current demography ==
The statistics for Islam in Jamaica estimate a total Muslim population of about 1,513. There are several Islamic organizations and mosques in Jamaica, including the Islamic Council of Jamaica which was founded in 1981 and the Islamic Education and Dawah Center, both located in Kingston and offering classes in Islamic studies and daily prayers in congregation. Outside Kingston organizations include Masjid Al Haq in Mandeville, Masjid Al-Ihsan in Negril, Masjid-Al-Hikmah in Ocho Rios, the Port Maria Islamic Center in Saint Mary, Masjid al Tauheed and the Mahdi Mosque in Old Harbour.

Estimates from 2017 suggest that Muslims remain a small but visible minority in the country, with community-based sources citing up to around 5,000 members, which remain largely under 1% of the total population. A large portion on Jamaican Muslims are reported to be living in the Kingston metropolitan area, where most of Jamaica's Islamic institutions are concentrated. However, Islamic life in Jamaica has recently been expanding to other towns across the island.

== Festivals ==
These are the main Islamic Festivals practiced by Jamaican Muslims:

- The Ramadan Fast
- Hosay (or Ashura)
- Id al Fitr (or Eid-Ul-Fitr)
- Eid al Adha (or Id-al-Kabir)
- Mawlid
- Miraj
- Hijrah
