= Indentured servitude =

Consensual or punitive unpaid labor

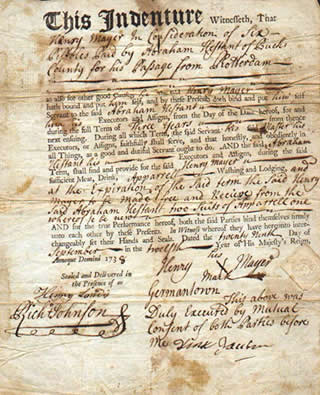
An indenture signed by Henry Mayer, with an "X", in 1738. This contract bound Mayer to Abraham Hestant of Bucks County, Pennsylvania, who had paid for Mayer to travel from Europe.

Indentured servitude is a form of free labor in which a person is contracted to work with or without salary for a specific number of years. The contract, called an "indenture", may be entered voluntarily for a prepaid lump sum, as payment for some good or service (e.g. travel), purported eventual compensation, or debt repayment. An indenture may also have been imposed involuntarily as a judicial punishment. The practice has been compared to the similar institution of slavery, although there are major differences.

Like any loan, an indenture could be sold. Most masters had to depend on middlemen or ships' masters to recruit and transport the workers, so indentureships were commonly sold by such men to planters or others upon the ships' arrival. Like slaves, their prices went up or down, depending on supply and demand. When the indenture (loan) was paid off, the worker was free but not always in good health or of sound body. Sometimes they might be given a plot of land or a small sum to buy it, but the land was usually poor. While most indentured laborers were adults, children could also be indentured, shifting the upkeep of the child to the contract holder but also giving the contract holder the benefit of the child's labour.

== Contracts ==
Through its introduction, the details regarding indentured labor varied across import and export regions and most overseas contracts were made before the voyage with the understanding that prospective migrants were competent enough to make overseas contracts on their own account and that they preferred to have a contract before the voyage.

Most labor contracts made were in increments of five years, with the opportunity to extend another five years. Many contracts also provided free passage home after the dictated labor was completed. However, there were generally no policies regulating employers once the labor hours were completed, which led to frequent ill-treatment.

== America ==
Until the late 18th century, indentured servitude was common in British America. It was often a way for Europeans to migrate to the American colonies: they signed an indenture in return for a costly passage. However, the system was also used to exploit many of them, as well as Asians (mostly from India and China) who wanted to migrate to the New World. These Asian people were used mainly to construct roads and railway systems. After their indenture expired, the immigrants were free to work for themselves or another employer. One economist named Robert Whaples has suggested that "indentured servitude was an economic arrangement designed to iron out imperfections in the capital market".

Between one-half and two-thirds of European immigrants to the American Colonies between the 1630s and the American Revolution came under indentures. However, while almost half the European immigrants to the Thirteen Colonies were indentured servants, at any one time they were outnumbered by workers who had never been indentured, or whose indenture had expired, and thus free wage labor was the more prevalent for Europeans in the colonies. Indentured people were numerically important mostly in the region from Virginia north to New Jersey. Other colonies saw far fewer of them. The total number of European immigrants to all 13 colonies before 1775 was about 500,000; of these 55,000 were involuntary prisoners. Of the 450,000 or so European arrivals who came voluntarily, Tomlins estimates that 48% were indentured. About 75% of these were under the age of 25. The age of adulthood for men was 24 years (not 21); those over 24 generally came on contracts lasting about three years. Regarding the children who came, Gary Nash reports that "many of the servants were nephews, nieces, cousins, and children of friends of emigrating Englishmen, who paid their passage in return for their labor once in America."

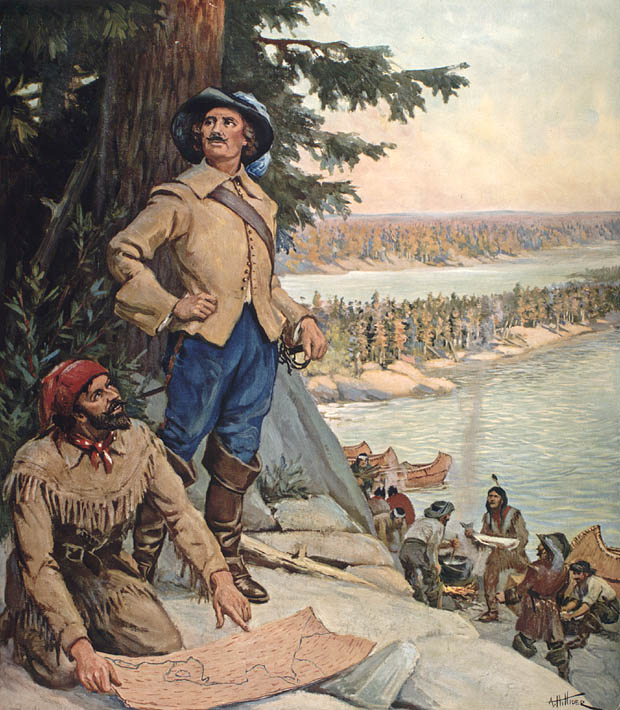
Jean Baptiste de La Vérendrye of New France with a group of engagés (indentured servants)

Several instances of kidnapping for transportation to the Americas are recorded, such as that of Peter Williamson (1730–1799). Historian Richard Hofstadter pointed out that "Although efforts were made to regulate or check their activities, and they diminished in importance in the eighteenth century, it remains true that a certain small part of the European colonial population of America was brought by force, and a much larger portion came in response to deceit and misrepresentation on the part of the spirits [recruiting agents]." One "spirit" named William Thiene was known to have spirited away 840 people from Britain to the colonies in a single year. Historian Lerone Bennett Jr. notes that "Masters given to flogging often did not care whether their victims were black or white."

During the 18th and early 19th centuries, children from the UK were often kidnapped and sold into indentured labor in the American and Caribbean colonies (often without any legal process or contract of indenture).

Indentured servants could not marry without the permission of their master, were frequently subject to physical punishment, and did not receive legal favor from the courts. Female indentured servants in particular might be raped and/or sexually abused by their masters. If children were produced the labour would be extended by two years.

The American Revolution severely limited immigration to the United States, but economic historians dispute its long-term impact. Sharon Salinger argues that the economic crisis that followed the war made long-term labor contracts unattractive. Her analysis of Philadelphia's population shows that the percentage of bound citizens fell from 17% to 6.4% throughout the war. William Miller posits a more moderate theory, stating that "the Revolution...wrought disturbances upon white servitude. But these were temporary rather than lasting". David Galenson supports this theory by proposing that the numbers of British indentured servants never recovered, and that Europeans of other nationalities replaced them.

Indentured servitude began its decline after Bacon's Rebellion, a servant uprising against the government of Colonial Virginia. This was due to multiple factors, such as the treatment of servants, the government's refusal to expel native tribes from the surrounding area, refusal to expand the amount of land an indentured servant could work by the colonial government, and inequality between the upper and lower class in colonial society. Indentured servitude was the primary source of labor for early American colonists until the rebellion. Little changed in the immediate aftermath of Bacon's Rebellion; however, the rebellion did cause a general distrust of servant labor and fear of future rebellion. The fear of indentured servitude eventually cemented itself into the hearts of Americans, leading towards the reliance on enslaved Africans. This helped to ingrain the idea of racial segregation and unite white Americans under race rather than economic or social class. Doing so prevented the potential for future rebellion and changed the way that agriculture was approached.

The American and British governments passed several laws that helped foster the decline of indentures. The UK Parliament's Passenger Vessels Act 1803 regulated travel conditions aboard ships to make transportation more expensive, and to hinder landlords' tenants seeking a better life. An American law passed in 1833 abolished the imprisonment of debtors, which made prosecuting runaway servants more difficult, increasing the risk of indenture contract purchases. The Thirteenth Amendment to the United States Constitution, passed in the wake of the American Civil War, made involuntary indentured servitude illegal in the United States, except for imprisonment, such as in for-profit prisons.

== Caribbean ==
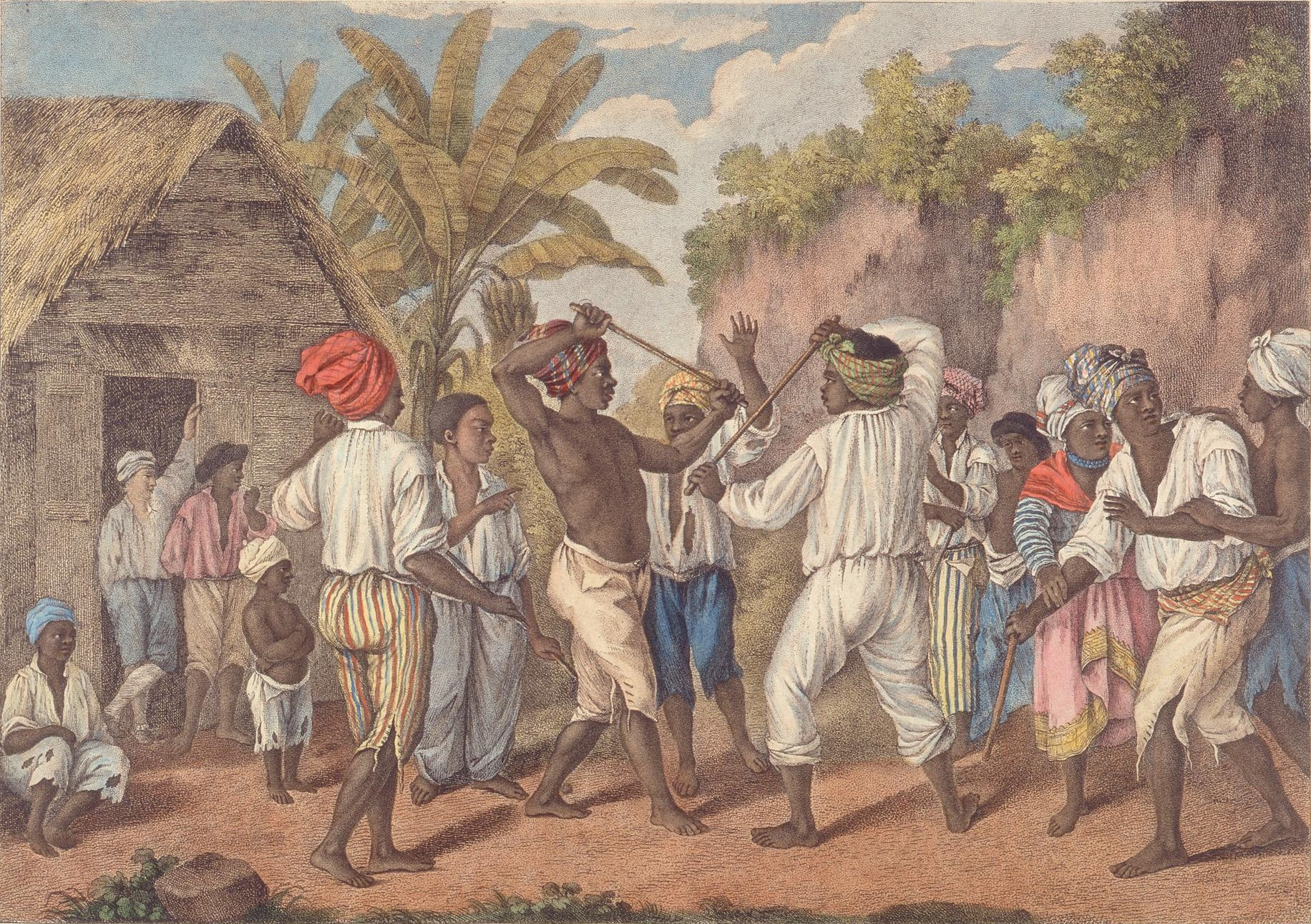
Slaves having a stick fight. A white indentured servant is standing on the left.

In 1643, the European population of Barbados was 37,200 (86% of the population). During the Wars of the Three Kingdoms, at least 10,000 Irish and some Scottish and English prisoners of war were transported as indentured laborers to the colonies. Approximately 500,000 Europeans migrated as indentured servants to the Caribbean (primarily the English-speaking islands of the Caribbean) before 1840.

In 1838, with the abolition of slavery at its onset, the British were in the process of transporting a million Indians out of India and into the Caribbean to take the place of the recently freed Africans (freed in 1833) in indentureship. Women, looking for what they believed would be a better life in the colonies, were specifically sought after and recruited at a much higher rate than men due to the high population of men already in the colonies. Women had to prove their status as single and eligible to emigrate, as married women could not leave without their husbands. Many women seeking escape from abusive relationships were willing to take that chance. The Indian Immigration Act of 1883 prevented women from exiting India as widowed or single in order to escape.

Arrival in the colonies brought unexpected conditions of poverty, homelessness, and little to no food as the high numbers of emigrants overwhelmed the small villages and flooded the labor market. Many were forced into signing labor contracts that exposed them to the hard field labor on the plantation. Additionally, on arrival to the plantation, single women were "assigned" a man as they were not allowed to live alone. The subtle difference between slavery and indentureship is best seen here as women were still subjected to the control of the plantation owners as well as their newly assigned "partners".

Indentured servitude of Irish and other European peoples occurred in seventeenth-century Barbados, and was fundamentally different from enslavement: an enslaved African's body was owned, as were the bodies of their children, while the labour of indentured servants was under contractual ownership of another person. Laws and racial hierarchy would allow for the "indentured" and "slaves" to be treated differently, as well as their identities to be defined differently. Barbados is an example of a colony in which the separation between enslaved Africans and "servants" was codified into law. Distinct legal "acts" were created in 1661 treating each party as a separate group.

The British ruling class anxieties over Irish loyalties would lead to harsh policing of Irish servants' movements, for instance, needing "reason" to leave the plantations from which they were employed. Similarly, the laws regarding slavery would prevent enslaved Africans from doing the same. While enslaved Africans – and for a period, free Africans – were not allowed to use the court system in any manner, even to act as a witness, Barbados would allow "white servants" to go to court if they felt that they had received poor treatment. Additionally, children of African descent were offered no supplementary protection, while children of English, Irish, Scottish, and Welsh extraction who were sent to Barbados as indentured servants could not work without a parent's consent.

Such differences in social classes would ensure that alliances between the two groups would not lead to revolts towards plantation owners and managers. As well, during periods of mass indentured servitude of Irish peoples in the Caribbean, certain Irish individuals would use enslaved labour to profit financially and climb the ladder of social class. Historians Kristen Block and Jenny Shaw write that: "the Irish – by virtue of their European heritage – gained [...] greater social and economic mobility." An example is a former indentured servant in Barbados, Cornelius Bryan, would go on to own land and enslaved people himself, demonstrating the tiers between servant and slave classes.

== South Asia ==
Indian woman in traditional dress

The Indian indenture system was a system of indenture by which two million Indians called coolies were transported to various colonies of European powers to provide labour for the (mainly sugar) plantations. It started from the end of slavery in 1833 and continued until 1920. This resulted in the development of a large Indian diaspora, which spread from the Indian Ocean (i.e. Réunion and Mauritius) to Pacific Ocean (i.e. Fiji), as well as the growth of Indo-Caribbean and Indo-African population.

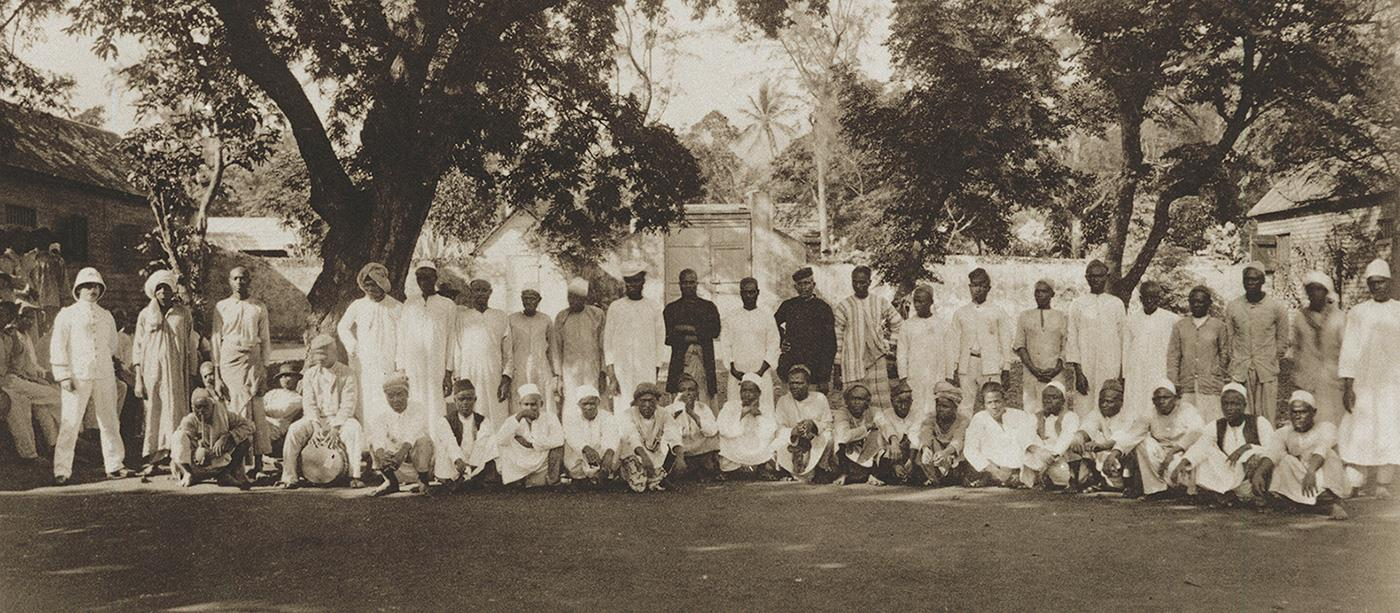
Depot of Comorian Indentured Servants in Saint-Denis, Reunion, second half of the 19th century

The British wanted local black Africans to work in Natal as workers. But the locals refused, and as a result, the British introduced the Indian indenture system, resulting in a permanent Indian South African presence. On 18 January 1826, the Government of the French Indian Ocean island of Réunion laid down terms for the introduction of Indian labourers to the colony. Each man was required to appear before a magistrate and declare that he was going voluntarily. The contract was for five years with pay of ₹8 (12¢ US) per month and rations provided labourers had been transported from Pondicherry and Karaikal. The first attempt at importing Indian labour into Mauritius, in 1829, ended in failure, but by 1834, with abolition of slavery throughout most of the British Empire, transportation of Indian labour to the island gained pace. By 1838, 25,000 Indian labourers had been transported to Mauritius.

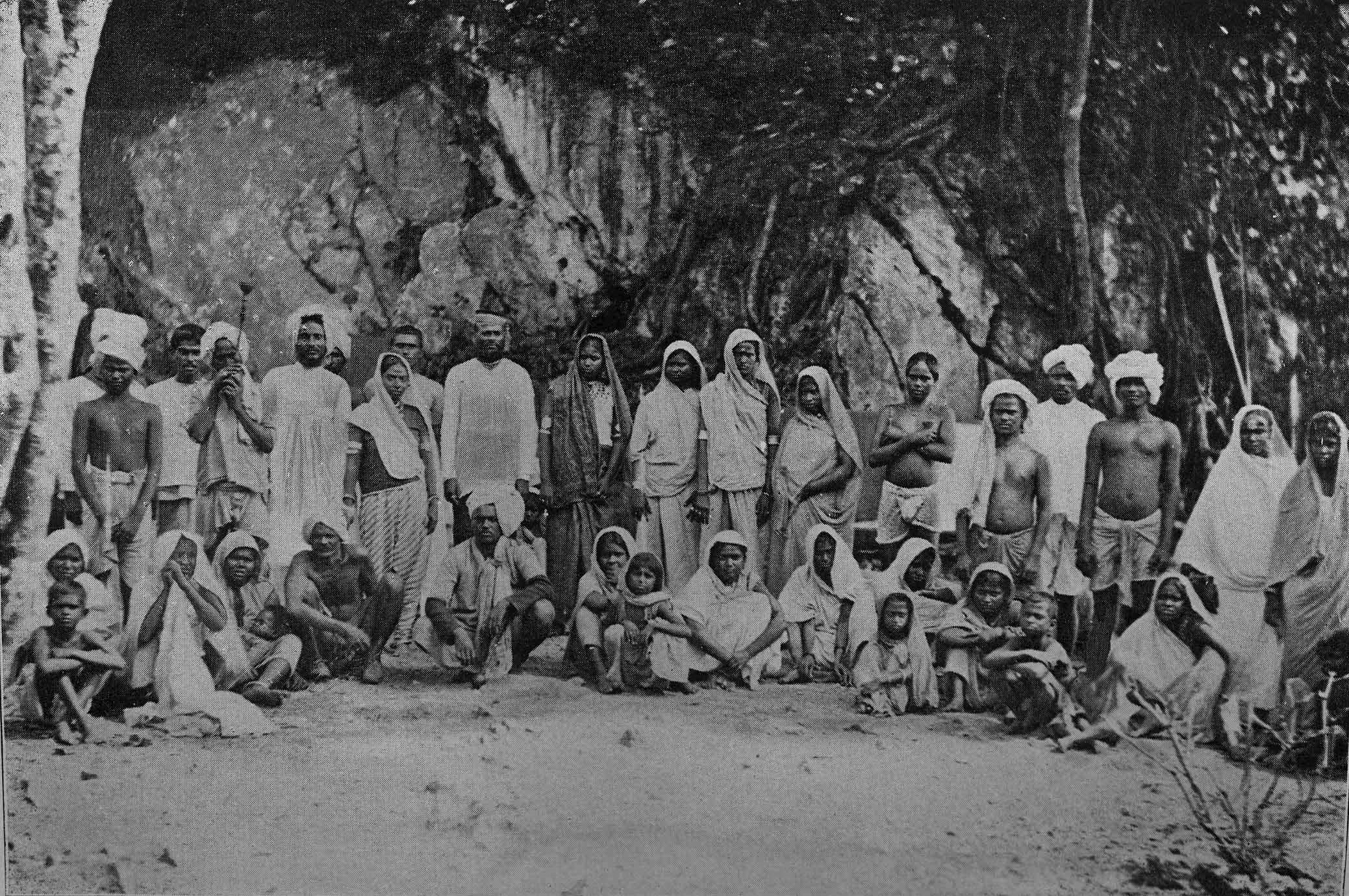
Newly arrived coolies in Trinidad in 1897

After the end of slavery, the West Indian sugar colonies tried to use the labor of emancipated slaves; families from Ireland, Germany and Malta; and Portuguese people from Madeira. All these efforts failed to satisfy the labour needs of the colonies due to high mortality of the new arrivals and their reluctance to continue working at the end of their indenture. On 16 November 1844, the British Indian Government legalised emigration to Jamaica, Trinidad and Demerara (Guyana). The first ship, Whitby, sailed from Calcutta for British Guiana on 13 January 1838, and arrived in Berbice on 5 May 1838. Transportation to the Caribbean stopped in 1848 due to problems in the sugar industry and resumed in Demerara and Trinidad in 1851 and Jamaica in 1860. This system of labour was coined by contemporaries at the time as a "new system of slavery", a term later used by historian Hugh Tinker in his influential book of the same name.

The Indian indenture system was finally banned in 1917. Although the system was officially suspended, those who were serving indentures at that time were required to complete their terms of service, thereby extending the system into the early 1920s. According to The Economist, "When the Imperial Legislative Council finally ended indenture...it did so because of pressure from Indian nationalists and declining profitability, rather than from humanitarian concerns."

== China ==
During the mid-19th century, thousands of Chinese laborers were contracted, often under deceptive or coercive means by slavers called crimps, to work in plantations across the Caribbean, Peru, and Hawaii. These migrations were a direct consequence of colonial powers seeking cheap labor post-slavery abolition, with Chinese trade docks being forced open by the unequal treaties following the Opium Wars.

These workers endured grueling labor conditions. A Yankee plantation manager in Hawaii is quoted as saying, "They have to work all the time — and no regard is paid to their complaints for food, etc., Slavery is nothing compared to it." These laborers were part of a larger post-abolition system that replaced chattel slavery with contract slavery. Testimonies from Chinese workers in Cuba document abuse, overwork, and limited legal recourse.

== Oceania ==
Convicts transported to the Australian colonies before the 1840s often found themselves hired out in a form of indentured labor. Indentured servants also emigrated to New South Wales. The Van Diemen's Land Company used skilled indentured labor for periods of seven years or less. A similar scheme for the Swan River Colony existed between 1829 and 1832.

During the 1860s planters in Australia, Fiji, New Caledonia, and the Samoa Islands, in need of laborers, encouraged a trade in long-term indentured labor called "blackbirding". At the height of the labor trade, more than one-half the adult male population of several of the islands worked abroad. Indentured labour existed in what is now Papua New Guinea.

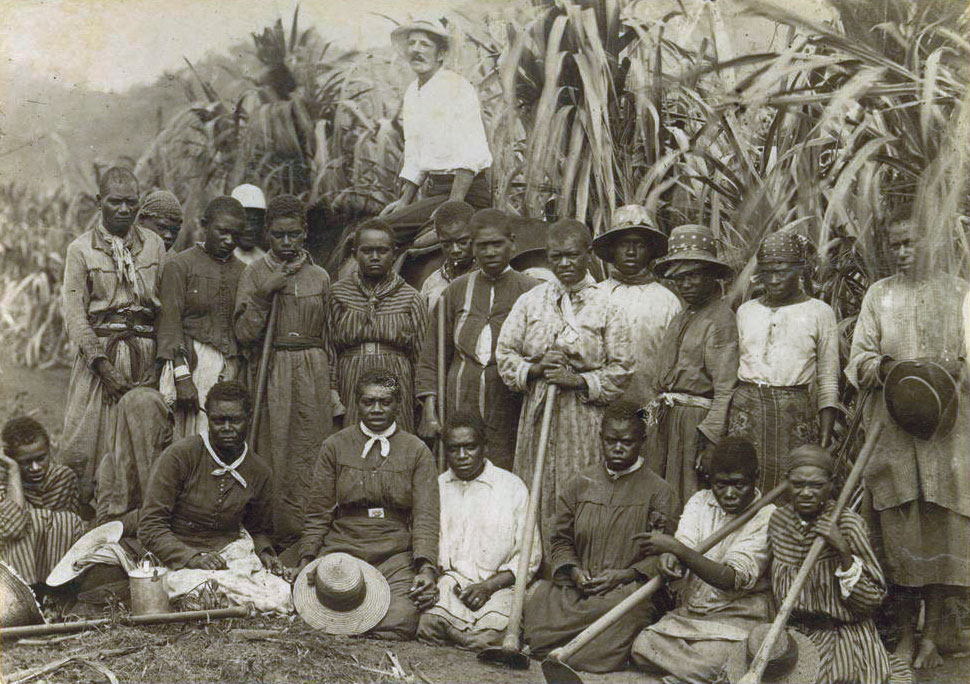
Kanaka workers in a sugar cane plantation in Queensland, late 19th century.

Over a period of 40 years, from the mid-19th century to the early 20th century, labor for the sugar-cane fields of Queensland, Australia included an element of coercive recruitment and indentured servitude of the 62,000 South Sea Islanders. The workers came mainly from Melanesia – mainly from the Solomon Islands and Vanuatu – with a small number from Polynesian and Micronesian areas such as Samoa, the Gilbert Islands (subsequently known as Kiribati) and the Ellice Islands (subsequently known as Tuvalu). They became collectively known as "Kanakas".

It remains unknown how many Islanders the trade controversially kidnapped. Whether the system legally recruited Islanders, persuaded, deceived, coerced or forced them to leave their homes and travel by ship to Queensland remains difficult to determine. Official documents and accounts from the period often conflict with the oral tradition passed down to the descendants of workers. Stories of blatantly violent kidnapping tend to relate to the first 10–15 years of the trade. Australia deported many of these Islanders back to their places of origin in the period 1906–1908 under the provisions of the Pacific Island Labourers Act 1901.

== Africa ==
A significant number of construction projects in British East Africa and South Africa, required vast quantities of labor, exceeding the availability or willingness of local tribesmen. Indentured Indians from India were imported, for such projects as the Uganda Railway, as farm labor, and as miners. They and their descendants formed a significant portion of the population and economy of Kenya and Uganda, although not without engendering resentment from others. Idi Amin's expulsion of the "Asians" from Uganda in 1972 was an expulsion of Indo-Africans.

The majority of the population of Mauritius are descendants of Indian indentured labourers brought in between 1834 and 1921. Initially brought to work the sugar estates following the abolition of slavery in the British Empire an estimated half a million indentured laborers were present on the island during this period. Aapravasi Ghat, in the bay at Port Louis and now a UNESCO site, was the first British colony to serve as a major reception centre for indentured Indians from India who came to work on plantations following the abolition of slavery.

== Legal status ==
The Universal Declaration of Human Rights (adopted by the United Nations General Assembly in 1948) declares in Article 4 "No one shall be held in slavery or servitude; slavery and the slave trade shall be prohibited in all their forms". More specifically, it is dealt with by article 1(a) of the United Nations 1956 Supplementary Convention on the Abolition of Slavery.

However, only national legislation can establish the unlawfulness of indentured labor in a specific jurisdiction. In the United States, the Victims of Trafficking and Violence Protection Act (VTVPA) of 2000 extended servitude to cover peonage as well as Involuntary Servitude.

== See also ==
- Bracero program
- Coolie
- Debt Bondage
- English Poor Laws
- Human trafficking
- Home Children
- Indenture (document)
- Indentured servitude in Pennsylvania
- Involuntary servitude
- Irish indentured servants
- List of indentured servants
- Padrone system
- Penal transportation
- Redemptioner
- Scottish poorhouse
- Slavery
- United States labor law
- Unpaid work
