= Growth of religion =

Growth of various religions in the world

Growth of religion involves the spread of individual religions and the increase in the numbers of religious adherents around the world. In sociology, desecularization is the proliferation or growth of religion, most commonly after a period of previous secularization. Statistics commonly measure the absolute number of adherents, the percentage of the absolute growth per-year, and the growth of converts in the world.

Studies in the 21st century suggest that, in terms of percentage and worldwide spread, Islam is the fastest-growing major religion in the world. A comprehensive religious forecast for 2050 by the Pew Research Center predicts that the global Muslim population will grow at a faster rate than the Christian population – primarily due to the average younger age, and higher fertility rate of Muslims. Religious conversion has no net impact on the Muslim population growth. In fact, conversion will have little impact on the size of religious groups. Pew projects that religious people will increase by 2050 due to increasing fertility rates in religious countries and decreasing fertility rates in less religious countries.

It is projected that birth rate – rather than conversion – will prove the main factor in the growth of any given religion. While according to other various scholars and sources Pentecostalism – a Protestant Christian movement – is the fastest growing religion in the world, this growth is primarily due to religious conversion. Counting the number of converts to a religion can prove difficult. Although some national censuses ask people about their religion, they do not ask if they have converted to their presently espoused faith. Additionally, in some countries, legal and social consequences make conversion difficult. For example, individuals can receive capital punishment if they openly leave Islam in some Muslim countries.

Some religions proselytise vigorously (Christianity and Islam, for example), while others (such as Judaism and Hinduism) do not generally encourage conversions into their ranks. Some faiths grow exponentially at first (especially, for example, along trade routes or for reasons of social prestige), only for their zeal to wane (note the flagging case of Zoroastrianism). The growth of a religion can interact with factors such as persecution, entrenched rival religions (such as established religions), and religious market saturation.

== Growth of religious groups ==
=== Buddhism ===
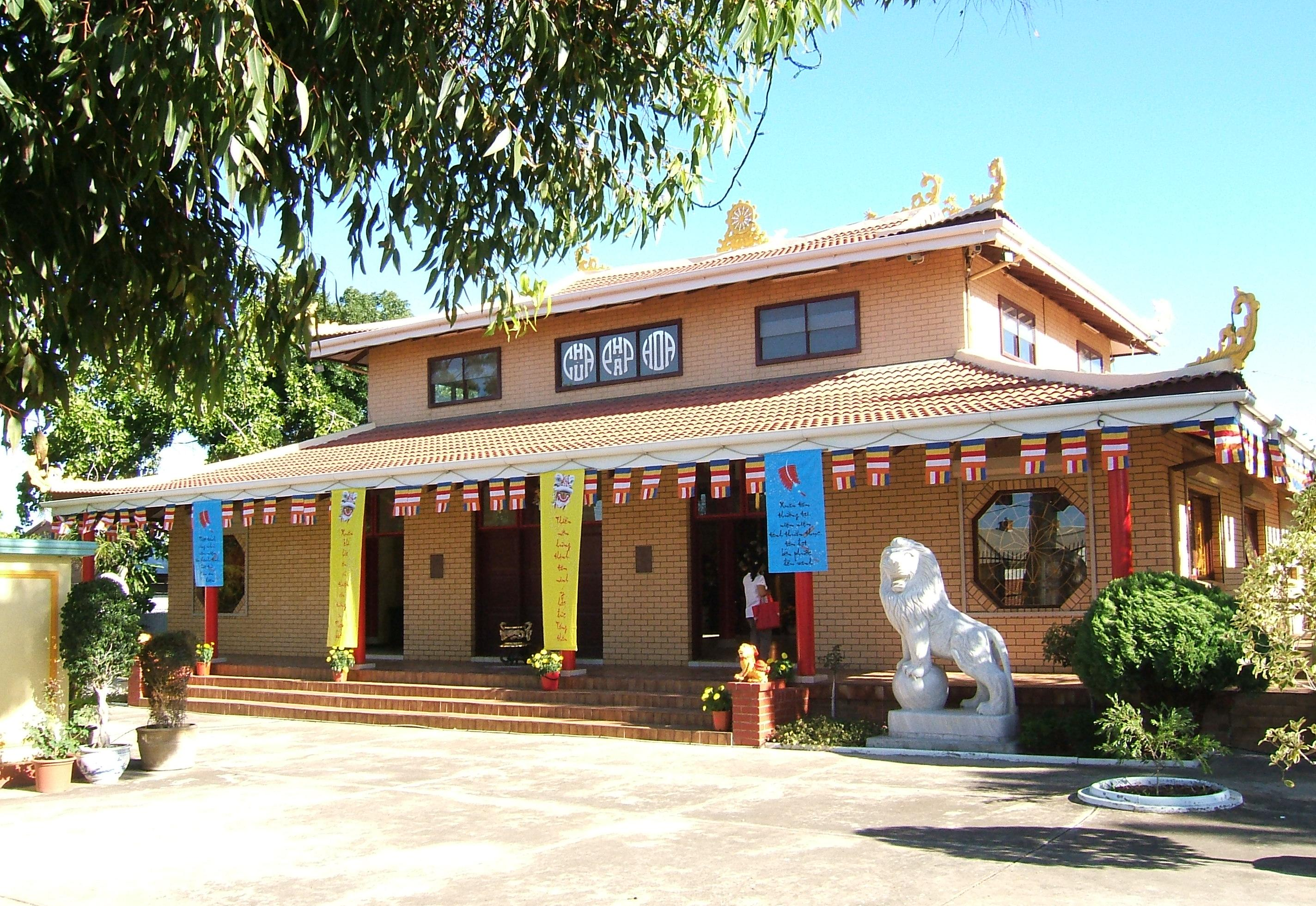
Phap Hoa Temple, a Buddhist temple in Adelaide, Australia. Buddhism is the fastest-growing religion by percentage in Australia.

Buddhism is based on the teachings of Siddhartha Gautama, commonly known as the Buddha, who was born in modern day Nepal and lived and taught in India in the 5th century BC. The majority of Buddhists live in Asia; Europe and North America also have populations exceeding one million. According to scholars of religious demographics, there are between 488 million, 495 million, and 535 million Buddhists in the world.

According to Johnson and Grim, Buddhism has grown from a total of 138 million adherents in 1910, of which 137 million were in Asia, to 495 million in 2010, of which 487 million are in Asia. According to them, there was a fast annual growth of Buddhism in Pakistan, Saudi Arabia, Lebanon and several Western European countries (1910–2010). More recently (2000–2010), the countries with highest growth rates are Qatar, the United Arab Emirates, and some African countries. The Australian Bureau of Statistics, through statistical analysis, held Buddhism to be the fastest-growing spiritual tradition in Australia in terms of percentage gain, with a growth of 79.1% for the period 1996 to 2001 (200,000→358,000).

Buddhism is the majority and state religion in seven countries: Sri Lanka, Myanmar, Mongolia, Thailand, Cambodia, Bhutan and Laos.

Buddhism is the majority religion in the following nine countries: Sri Lanka, Myanmar, Thailand, Cambodia, Laos, Bhutan, Mongolia, Japan and Singapore.

Special administrative areas in China are Buddhist majority areas such as Macau, Hong Kong and Tibet.

Kalmykia is the only Buddhist majority region in Europe. It is an autonomous republic in Russia.

According to a 2012 Pew Research Center survey, over the next four decades the number of Buddhists around the world is expected to decrease from 487 million in 2010 to 486 million in 2050. The decline is due to several factors such as the low fertility level among Buddhists (1.6 children per woman), and the old age (median age of 34), compared to the overall population. According to the Pew Research Center published on 2010, religious conversion may have little impact on the Buddhists population between 2010 and 2050; Buddhists are expected to lose 2.9 million adherents between 2010 and 2050.

According to a 2017 Pew Research Center survey, between 2010 and 2015 "an estimated 32 million babies were born to Buddhist mothers and roughly 20 million Buddhists died, meaning that the natural increase in the Buddhists population – i.e., the number of births minus the number of deaths – was 12 million over this period". According to the same study Buddhists "are projected to decline in absolute number, dropping 7% from nearly 500 million in 2015 to 462 million in 2060. Low fertility rates and aging populations in countries such as China, Thailand and Japan are the main demographic reasons for the expected shrinkage in the Buddhist population in the years ahead".

=== Chinese traditional religion ===
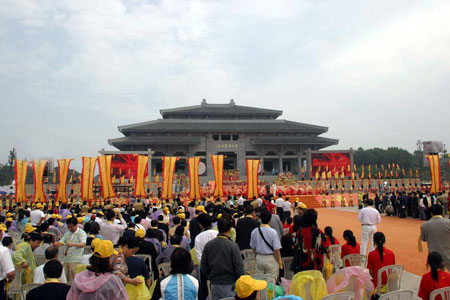
Public worship ceremony at the Temple of Shennong-Yandi, in Suizhou, Hubei

According to a survey of religion in China in the year 2010, the number of people practicing some form of Chinese folk religion is near to 950 million (70% of the Chinese), of which 173 million (13%) practice some form of Taoist-defined folk faith. Further in detail, 12 million people have passed some formal initiation into Taoism, or adhere to the official Chinese Taoist Association. Comparing this with other surveys, evidence suggests that nowadays three-fifths to four-fifths of the Chinese believe in folk religion. This shows a significant growth from the 300–400 million people practicing Chinese traditional religion that were estimated in the 1990s and early 2000s.

This growth reverses the rapid decline that Chinese traditional religion faced in the 20th century. Moreover, Chinese religion has also spread throughout the world following the emigration of Chinese populations, with 672,000 adherents in Canada as of 2010.

According to scholars Miikka Ruokanen and Paulos Huang of University of Helsinki, the rebirth of traditional religion in China is faster and larger than the spread of other religions in the country, such as Buddhism and Christianity:

Since the 1980s, with the gradual opening of society, folk religion has begun to recover. Especially in the rural areas, the speed and scale of its development are much faster and larger than is the case with Buddhism and Christianity [...] in Zhejiang province, where Christianity is better established than elsewhere, temples of folk religion are usually twenty or even a hundred times as numerous as Christian church buildings.

The number of adherents of the Chinese traditional religion is difficult to count, because of :

Chinese rarely use the term "religion" for their popular religious practices, and they also do not utilize a vocabulary that they "believe in" gods or truths. Instead, they engage in religious acts that assume a vast array of gods and spirits and that also assume the efficacy of these beings in intervening in this world.

The Chinese folk religion is a "diffused religion" rather than "institutional". It is a meaning system of social solidarity and identity, ranging from the kinship systems to the community, the state, and the economy, that serves to integrate Chinese culture.

=== Christianity ===
World Christianity by tradition in 2024 as per World Christian Database
1. Catholic (48.6%)
2. Protestant (39.8%)
3. Orthodox (11.1%)
4. Other (0.50%)

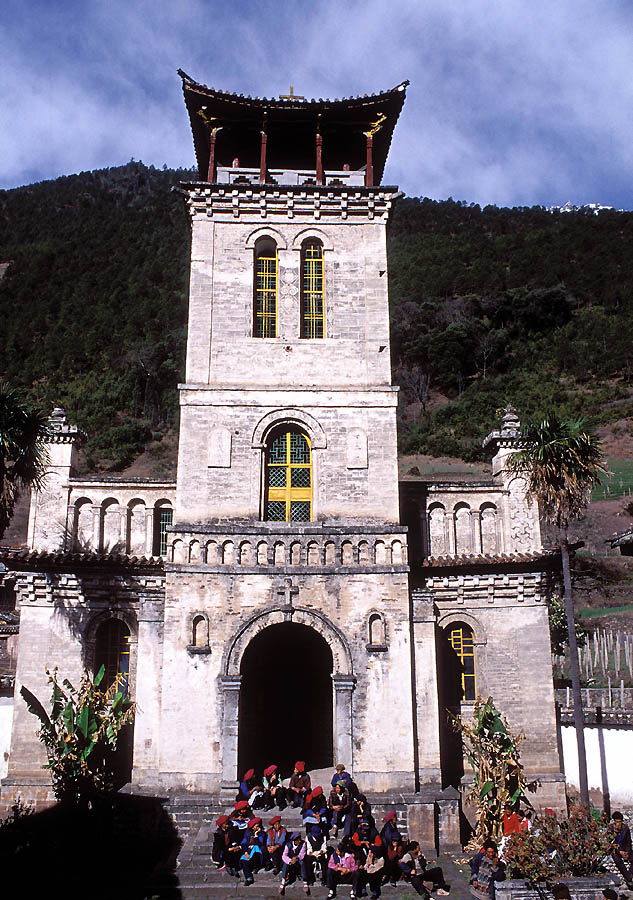
Sacred Heart Church in Tibet: The number of Chinese Christians has increased significantly; from 4 million before 1949 to 67 million in 2010.

According to a 2011 Pew Research Center survey, there are 2.2 billion Christians around the world in 2010, up from about 600 million in 1910. And according to a 2012 Pew Research Center survey, within the next four decades, Christians will remain the world's largest religion; if current trends continue, by 2050 the number of Christians will reach 3 billion (or 31.4%). According to a 2017 Pew Research Center survey, by 2060 Christians will remain the world's largest religion; and the number of Christians will reach 3.05 billion (or 31.8%). According to scholar Mark Juergensmeyer of University of California, Berkeley, the global Christian population increased at an average annual rate of 2.3%, while Roman Catholicism is growing by 1.3% annually, Protestantism is growing by 3.3% annually, and Evangelicalism and Pentecostalism is growing by 7% annually. According to the Carnegie Endowment for International Peace, Christianity (growth rate, 1.38%) is one of the six fastest-growing religions in the world, with high birth rates and conversions in the global South were being cited as the major reasons of the Christian population growth.

By 2050, the Christian population is expected to exceed 3 billion. Christians have 2.7 children per woman, which is above replacement level (2.1). The birth rate is expected to be the main factor in the growth of Christianity. According to Pew Research Center study, by 2050 the number of Christians in absolute number is expected to grow to more than double in the next few decades, from 517 million to 1.1 billion in Sub Saharan Africa, from 531 million to 665 million in Latin America and Caribbean, from 287 million to 381 million in Asia, and from 266 million to 287 million in North America. By 2050, Christianity is expected to remain the majority of population and the largest religious group in Latin America and Caribbean (89%), North America (66%), Europe (65.2%) and Sub Saharan Africa (59%).

Europe was the home for the world's largest Christian population for the past 1,000 years, but since 2015 Christians in Africa and Latin America respectively surpass the Europe Christian population because of the high fertility rate there. in 2018 a new data from the Gordon Theological Seminary shows that, for the first time ever, more number of Christians live in Africa than on any other single continent: "The results show Africa on top with 631 million Christian residents, Latin America in 2nd place with 601 million Christians, and Europe in 3rd place with 571 million Christians". In 2017 Christianity added nearly 50 million people due to factors such as birth rate and religious conversion. According to a 2017 Pew Research Center survey, between 2010 and 2015 "an estimated 223 million babies were born to Christian mothers and roughly 107 million Christians died, meaning that the natural increase in the Christian population – i.e., the number of births minus the number of deaths – was 116 million over this period".

According to Mark Jürgensmeyer of the University of California, popular Protestantism is one of the most dynamic religious movements in the contemporary world. According to various scholars and sources Pentecostalism – a Protestant Christian movement – is the fastest growing religion in the world, this growth is primarily due to religious conversion. According to Pulitzer Center 35,000 people become Pentecostal or "Born again" every day. According to scholar Keith Smith of Georgia State University "many scholars claim that Pentecostalism is the fastest growing religious phenomenon in human history", and according to scholar Peter L. Berger of Boston University "the spread of Pentecostal Christianity may be the fastest growing movement in the history of religion". Changes in worldwide Protestantism over the last century have been significant. Since 1900, due primarily to conversion, Protestantism has spread rapidly in Africa, Asia, Oceania and Latin America. That caused Protestantism to be called a primarily non-Western religion. Much of the growth has occurred after World War II, when decolonization of Africa and abolition of various restrictions against Protestants in Latin American countries occurred. According to one source, Protestants constituted respectively 2.5%, 2%, 0.5% of Latin Americans, Africans and Asians. In 2000, percentage of Protestants on mentioned continents was 17%, more than 27% and 5.5%, respectively.

The significant growth of Christianity in non-Western countries led to regional distribution changes of Christians. In 1900, Europe and the Americas were home to the vast majority of the world's Christians (93%). Besides, Christianity has grown enormously in Sub-Saharan Africa, Asia, and the Pacific. In 2010, 26% of the world's Christians lived in Europe, followed by 24.4% in Latin America and the Caribbean, 23.8% in Sub-Saharan Africa, 13.2% in Asia and the Pacific, 12.3% in North America, and 1% in the Middle East and North Africa. The study also suggested that by 2050, the global Christian population will change considerably. By 2050, 38% of the world's Christians will live in the Sub-Saharan Africa, followed by 23% in Latin America and the Caribbean, 16% in Europe, 13% in Asia and the Pacific and 10% of the world's Christians will live in North America.

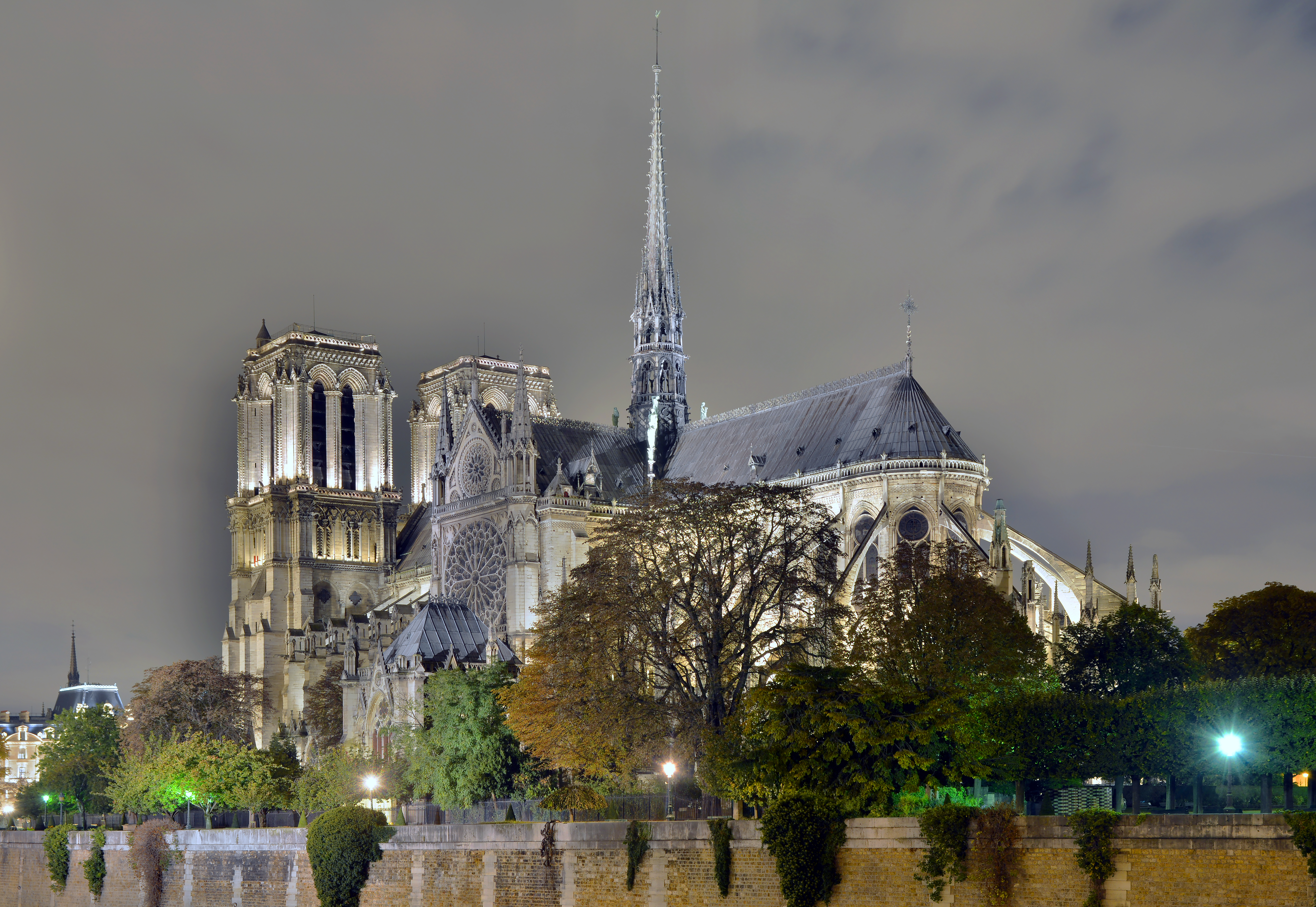
Notre-Dame de Paris: Christianity is still the largest religion in Western Europe (71% in 2018).

In mid-2005 Christianity adds about 65.1 million people annually due to factors such as birth rate and religious conversion, while losing 27.4 million people annually due to factors such as death rate and religious apostasy. Most of the net growth in the numbers of Christians is in Africa, Latin America and Asia.

Christianity is still the largest religion in Western Europe, according to a 2018 study by the Pew Research Center, 71.0% of the Western European population identified themselves as Christians, however, most of them are non-practicing and non- church-attending. According to the same study, a large majority of those who raised as Christians (83%) in Western Europe, still identified themselves as Christians today. On the other hand, Central and Eastern European countries did not experience a decline in the percentage of Christians, as the proportion of Christians in these countries have mostly been stable or even increasing. Christianity is still the largest religion in Central and Eastern Europe, according to a 2017 study by the Pew Research Center, the share of adults who identify themselves as Eastern Orthodox in Russia, Ukraine and Bulgaria has been significantly increased between 1991 and 2015. According to scholar Barry John Tolmay of University of Pretoria there are increasing signs of a Christian revival in Romania, Slovakia and Bulgaria.

According to a 2005 paper submitted to a meeting of the American Political Science Association, most of Christianity's growth has occurred in non-Western countries. The paper concludes that the Pentecostalism movement is the fastest-growing religion worldwide. Protestantism is growing primarily as a result of historic missionary activity and the recently high fertility rate in Africa, and due primarily to conversion in China. According to scholar Paul Freston of Wilfrid Laurier University Pentecostalism continues to grow in Latin America, "both by conversion and by high birth rates". According to scholar Francis Fukuyama of Stanford University "converts to Protestantism find their incomes, education levels, hygiene and social networks expanding". According to scholar Terence Chong, since 1980s Protestantism is expanding in Singapore, Indonesia, Malaysia, Taiwan, and South Korea. According to a 2014 study by the Pew Research Center, around 9% of Latin Americans were raised as Protestant, but nearly 19% now identify themselves as Protestants.

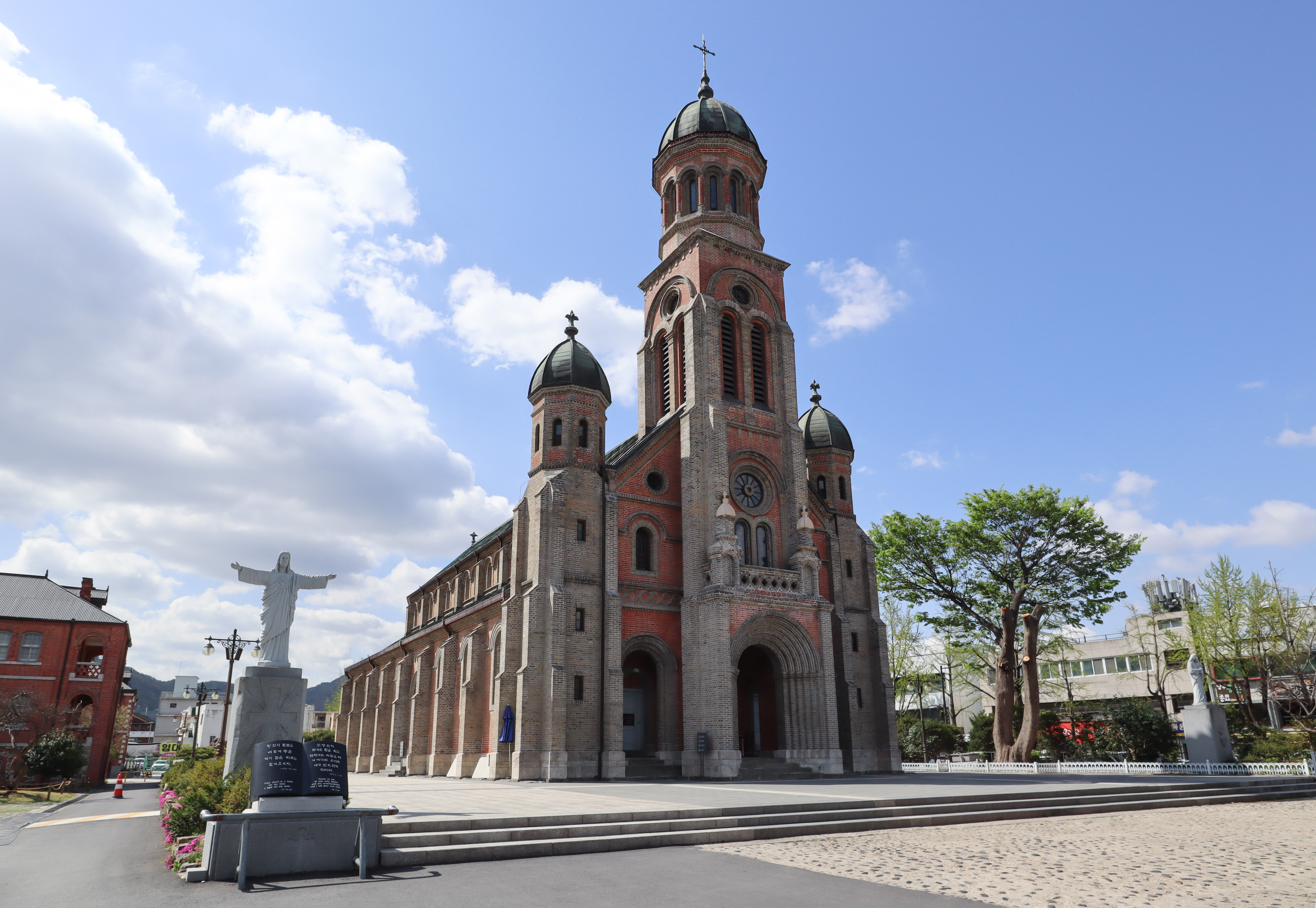
A church in South Korea: Christianity has grown rapidly in South Korea from 1% in 1900 to 29.3% in 2010, due to the efforts of missionaries.

The US Department of State estimated in 2005 that Protestants in Vietnam may have grown by 600% over the previous 10 years. According to Pew Research Center, "largely through the efforts of missionaries and churches, Christianity has grown rapidly in South Korea over the past century", and has grown from 1% in 1900, to 20.7% in 1985 and to 29.3% in 2010, And the Catholic Church has increased its membership by 70% in the last ten years, according to Pew Research Center, "the growth of Catholics has occurred across all age groups, among men and women and across all education levels. In Singapore, the percentage of Christians among Singaporeans increased from 12.7%, in 1990, to 17.5%, in 2010. According to scholar Michael Nai-Chiu Poon of University of Toronto conversion to Christianity is increasing among Chinese Singaporeans.

In recent years, the number of Chinese Christians has increased significantly; Christians were 4 million before 1949 (3 million Catholics and 1 million Protestants), and are reaching 67 million today. Christianity is reportedly the fastest growing religion in China with an average annual rate of 7% as of 2015. Some reports also show that the number of the Chinese Indonesians Christians have increased, according to scholar Gavin W. Jones of Australian National University, "there has been a rapid growth in the number of Chinese Christians" in Indonesia, and "conversion of Chinese to Christianity accelerated in the 1960s, especially in East Java, and for Indonesia as a whole the proportion of Chinese who were Catholics rose from 2 percent in 1957 to 6 percent in 1969". Professor Aris Ananta reported in 2008 that "anecdotal evidence suggests that more Buddhist Chinese have become Christians as they increased their standards of education, because Christianity, unlike Buddhism, is often associated with 'modernity' and Western education", although there are no stats to support this. According to a poll conducted by the Gallup Organization in 2006, Christianity has increased significantly in Japan, particularly among youth, and a high number of teens are becoming Christians.

In 1900, there were only 8.7 million adherents of Christianity in Africa, while in 2010 there were 390 million. It is expected that by 2025 there will be 600 million Christians in Africa. In Nigeria, the percentage of Christians has grown from 21.4%, in 1953, to 50.8%, in 2010. In South Africa, Pentecostalism has grown from 0.2%, in 1951, to 7.6%, in 2001. According to Pew Research Center the number of Catholics in Africa has increased from one million in 1901 to 329,882,000 in 2010. From 2015 to 2016, Africa saw an increase of more than 6,265,000 Catholics.

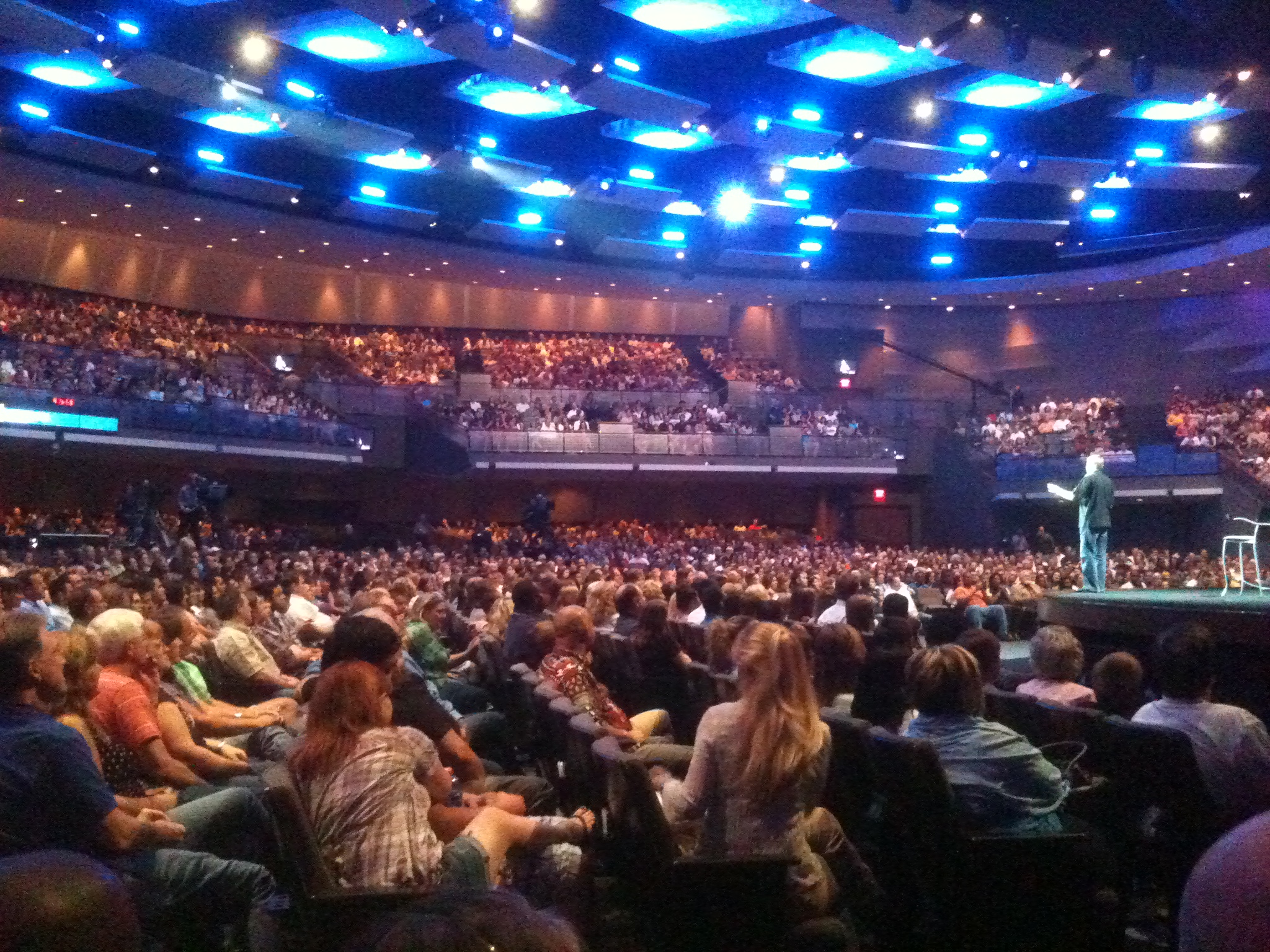
An event at Evangelical church: Protestantism is among the most dynamic religious movements in the contemporary world.

Catholic Church membership in 2013 was 1.254 billion, which is 17.7% of the world population, an increase from 437 million, in 1950 and 654 million, in 1970. The main growth areas have been Asia and Africa, 39% and 32%, respectively, since 2000. Since 2010, the rate of increase was of 0.3% in the Americas and Europe. On the other hand, Eric Kaufman, of University of London, argued that the main reason for the expansion of Catholicism and conservative Protestantism along with other religions is because their religions tend to be "pro-natal" and they have more children, and not due to religious conversion.

The total Protestant population has reached 1.17 billion in 2024. Protestantism is one of the most dynamic religious movements in the contemporary world. Evangelical Christian denominations also are among the fastest-growing denominations in some Catholic Christian countries, such as Brazil and France (France going from 2% to 3% of the population). In Brazil, the total number of Protestants jumped from 16.2% in 2000 to 22.2% in 2010 (for the first time, the percentage of Catholics in Brazil is less than 70%). These cases do not contribute to a growth of Christianity overall, but rather to a substitution of a brand of Christianity with another one.

According to the records of the Church of Jesus Christ of Latter-day Saints, its membership has grown every decade since its beginning in the 1830s, it is among the top ten largest Christian denominations in the U.S., and it was the fastest growing church in the U.S. in 2012.

The 19th century saw at least 250,000 Jews convert to Christianity according to existing records of various societies. Data from the Pew Research Center has it that, as of 2013, about 1.6 million adult American Jews identify themselves as Christians, most as Protestants. According to the same data, most of the Jews who identify themselves as some sort of Christian (1.6 million) were raised as Jews or are Jews by ancestry. According to a 2012 study, 17% of Jews in Russia identify themselves as Christians. According to study by Pew Research Center in 2021, around 19% of American those who say they were raised Jewish or who had at least one Jewish parent now identify as Christian.

According to the historian Geoffrey Blainey from the University of Melbourne, since the 1960s there has been a substantial increase in the number of conversions from Islam to Christianity, mostly to the Evangelical and Pentecostal forms. According to Blainey, this is due to several reasons, including the lack of ties of Evangelical Christianity with colonial powers in contrast to Roman Catholic and Mainline Protestant Churches, as well as the rising of Islamism, which lead some Muslims to look towards other religions such as Christianity through evangelical activity in the visual and audio media, as well as irreligion. Many Muslims who convert to Christianity face social and governmental persecution. Khalil Bilici, while admitting that the limitations of their 2007 study database are too small, found a good number of Middle Eastern people are likely to convert to Christianity after leaving Islam.

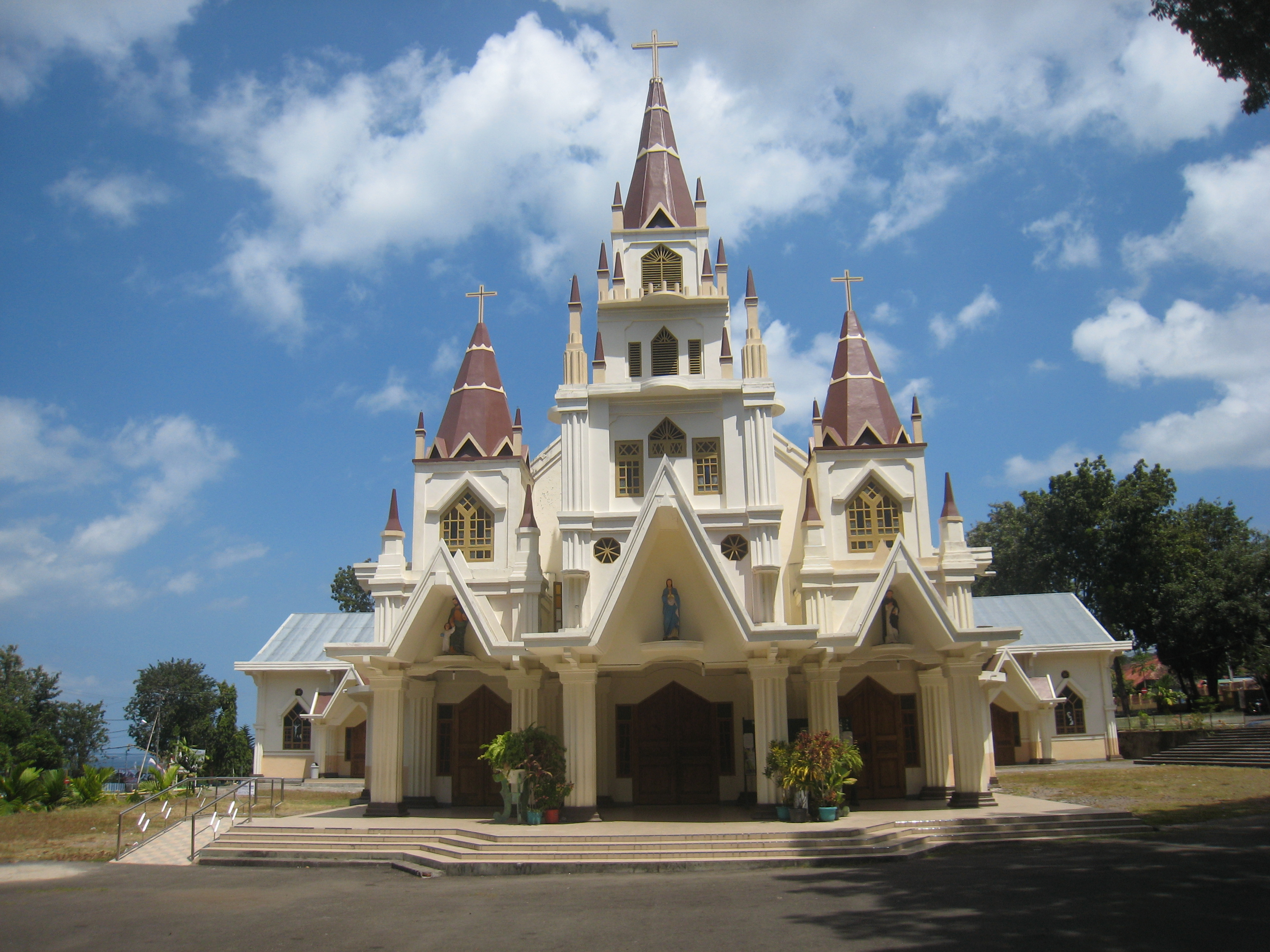
A church in Indonesia: Since the mid and late 1960s, between two million to 2.5 million Muslims converted to Christianity in Indonesia.

According to the World Christian Encyclopedia estimate significantly more people have converted to Christianity from Islam in the 21st century than at any other point in Islamic history. Indonesia is home to the largest Christian community made up of converts from their former Islamic faith; according to various sources, since the mid and late 1960s, between two million to 2.5 million Muslims converted to Christianity.

Christians of Muslim background communities can be found in Afghanistan, Albania, Algeria, Argentina, Australia, Austria, Azerbaijan, Bangladesh, Belgium, Bosnia and Herzegovina, Bulgaria, Canada, Denmark, Egypt, Ethiopia, Finland, France, Georgia (Abkhazia), Germany, Greece, India (kashmir), Iran, Iraq, Kazakhstan, Kosovo, Kyrgyzstan, Lebanon, Malaysia, Morocco, the Netherlands, Nigeria, Russia, Saudi Arabia, Singapore, Sweden, Syria, Tanzania, Tajikistan, Tunisia, Turkey, United Kingdom, the United States, Uzbekistan, and other countries. According to the Council on Foreign Relations in 2007, experts estimated that thousands of Muslims in the Western world converted to Christianity annually, but were not publicized due to fear of retribution.

According to scholar Rob Scott of University of Tasmania in 2010 there were "approximately 180,000 Arab Americans and about 130,000 Iranian Americans who converted from Islam to Christianity", Scholar Dudley Woodberry form Fuller Theological Seminary estimated approximately that 20,000 Muslims converts to Christianity annually in the United States. Also according to the historian Daniel Pipes of Harvard University and University of Chicago, and a researcher specializing in criticism of Islam, "reports of widespread conversions of Muslims to Christianity come from regions as disparate as Algeria, Albania, Syria, and Kurdistan", in northern Iraq and Algeria, the conversions of Kurds and Berbers to Christianity are unusually high. According to Guinness, approximately 12.5 million more people who converted to Islam than people who converted to Christianity between 1990 and 2000. According to scholar Ladan Boroumand "Iran today is witnessing the highest rate of Christianization in the world", and according to scholar Shay Khatiri of Johns Hopkins University "Islam is the fastest shrinking religion in there [Iran], while Christianity is growing the fastest", and in 2018 "up to half a million Iranians are Christian converts from Muslim families, and most of these Christians are evangelicals", and he adds "recent estimates claim that the number might have climbed up to somewhere between 1 million and 3 million". Converting to Christianity is growing among Muslims in the Albanian diaspora, Iranian diaspora, and Syrian diaspora, and among Muslim Maghrebis in France, and Kurds and Turks in Germany. According to scholars Felix Wilfred from the University of Madras and Chris Hann from the University of Cambridge and Max Planck Institute for Social Anthropology, since the fall of communism, the number of Muslim converts to Christianity in Kyrgyzstan has been increased. Some scholars and media reports indicate that in the Middle East there been increasing numbers of conversions to Christianity among the Berbers, Kurds, Persians, and Turks, and among some religious minorities such as Alawites and Druze. Churches in Europe say that there is an increase in the number of Muslims converting to Christianity among immigrants.

Religious conversions are projected to have a "modest impact on changes in the religious groups including Christian population" between 2010 and 2050; and may negatively affect the growth of Christian population and its share of the world's populations "slightly". According to the same study Christianity, is expected to lose a net of 66 million adherents (40 million converts versus 106 million apostate) mostly to religiously unaffiliated category between 2010 and 2050. It is also expected that Christianity may have the largest net losses in terms of religious conversion. However, these forecasts lack reliable data on religious conversion in China, but according to media reports and expert assessments, it is possible that the rapid growth of Christianity in China may maintain, or even increase, the current numerical advantage of Christianity as the largest religion in the world. This scenario (Chinese scenario) is based primarily on sensitivity tests. Large increases in the developing world (around 23,000 per day) have been accompanied by substantial declines in the developed world, mainly in Western Europe and North America. By 2050, Christianity is expected to remain the majority religion in the United States (66.4%, down from 78.3% in 2010), and the number of Christians in absolute numbers is expected to grow from 243 million to 262 million.

According to the Pew Research Center, Christianity is declining in the United States while non-Christian faiths are growing. The 2014 Religious Landscape Study finds a large majority (87.6%) of those who were raised as Christians in the United States still identify as such, while the rest who no longer identify as Christians mostly identify as religiously unaffiliated, and the number of those leaving Christianity in the United States is greater than the number of converts; however, the number of those convert to evangelical Christianity in the United States is greater than the number of those leaving that faith. While on the other hand, in 2017, scholars Landon Schnabel and Sean Bock at Harvard University and Indiana University argued that while "Mainline Protestant" churches has declined in the United States since the late 1980s, but many of them do not leave Christianity, but rather convert to another Christian denomination, in particularly to evangelicalism. Schnabel and Bock argued also that evangelicalism and Conservative Christianity has persisted and expanded in the United States. And according to Eric Kaufmann from Harvard University and University of London, Christian fundamentalism is expanding in the United States.

Map of the world by population of Christians (Pew 2010)

According to study published by the missionary statistician and professor David B. Barrett of Columbia University, and professor of global Christianity, historian George Thomas Kurian, and both are work on World Christian Encyclopedia, approximately 2.7 million converting to Christianity annually from another religion, World Christian Encyclopedia also cited that Christianity ranks at first place in net gains through religious conversion. On the other hand, demographer Conrad Hackett of Pew Research Center stated that the World Christian Encyclopedia gives a higher estimate for percent Christian when compared to other cross-national data sets. While according to the book The Oxford Handbook of Religious Conversion, which written by professor of the Christian mission, Charles E. Farhadian, and professor of psychology, Lewis Rambo, in mid-2005 approximately 15.5 million converted to Christianity from another religion, while approximately 11.7 million left Christianity, most of them becoming irreligious, resulting in a net gain of 3.8 million.

According to scholar Philip Jenkins Christianity is growing rapidly in China and some other Asian countries and sub-Saharan Africa. According to a study by a scholar Fenggang Yang from Purdue University, Christianity is "spreading among the Chinese of South-East Asia", and "Evangelical and Pentecostal Christianity is growing more quickly in China", also according to him, more than half of them have university degrees. According to a report by the Singapore Management University, more people in Southeast Asia are converting to Christianity, and these new converts are mostly Chinese business managers. According to scholar Juliette Koning and Heidi Dahles of Vrije Universiteit Amsterdam there is a "rapid expansion of charismatic Christianity from the 1980s onwards. Singapore, Mainland China, Hong Kong, Taiwan, Indonesia, and Malaysia are said to have the fastest-growing Christian communities and the majority of the new believers are "upwardly mobile, urban, middle-class Chinese". Asia has the second largest Pentecostal-charismatic Christians of any continent, with the number growing from 10 million to 135 million between 1970 and 2000". According to the Council on Foreign Relations the "number of Chinese Protestants has grown by an average of 10 percent annually since 1979". According to scholar Todd Hartch of Eastern Kentucky University, by 2005, around 6 million Africans converted to Christianity annually. While the exact number of Dalit converts to Christianity in India is not available, scholar William R. Burrow of Colorado State University estimated that about 8% of Dalit have converted to Christianity. According to a 2021 study by the Pew Research Center, Christianity in India gained an increase from conversion, most of the Christian converts in India are former Hindus.

It has been reported also that increasing numbers of young people or educated people are becoming Christians in several countries such as China, Indonesia, Iran, Japan, Singapore, and South Korea. It has also been reported that conversion into Christianity is significantly increasing among Korean, Chinese, and Japanese in the United States. By 2012 percentage of Christians on mentioned communities was 71%, more than 30% and 37%, respectively. According to the World Christian Encyclopedia, between 1965 and 1985 about 2.5 million Indonesians converted from Islam to Christianity. Many people who convert to Christianity face persecution.

=== Deism ===
The 2001 American Religious Identification Survey (ARIS) survey estimated that between 1990 and 2001 the number of self-identifying deists grew from 6,000 to 49,000, representing about 0.02% of the US population at the time.

=== Druze ===
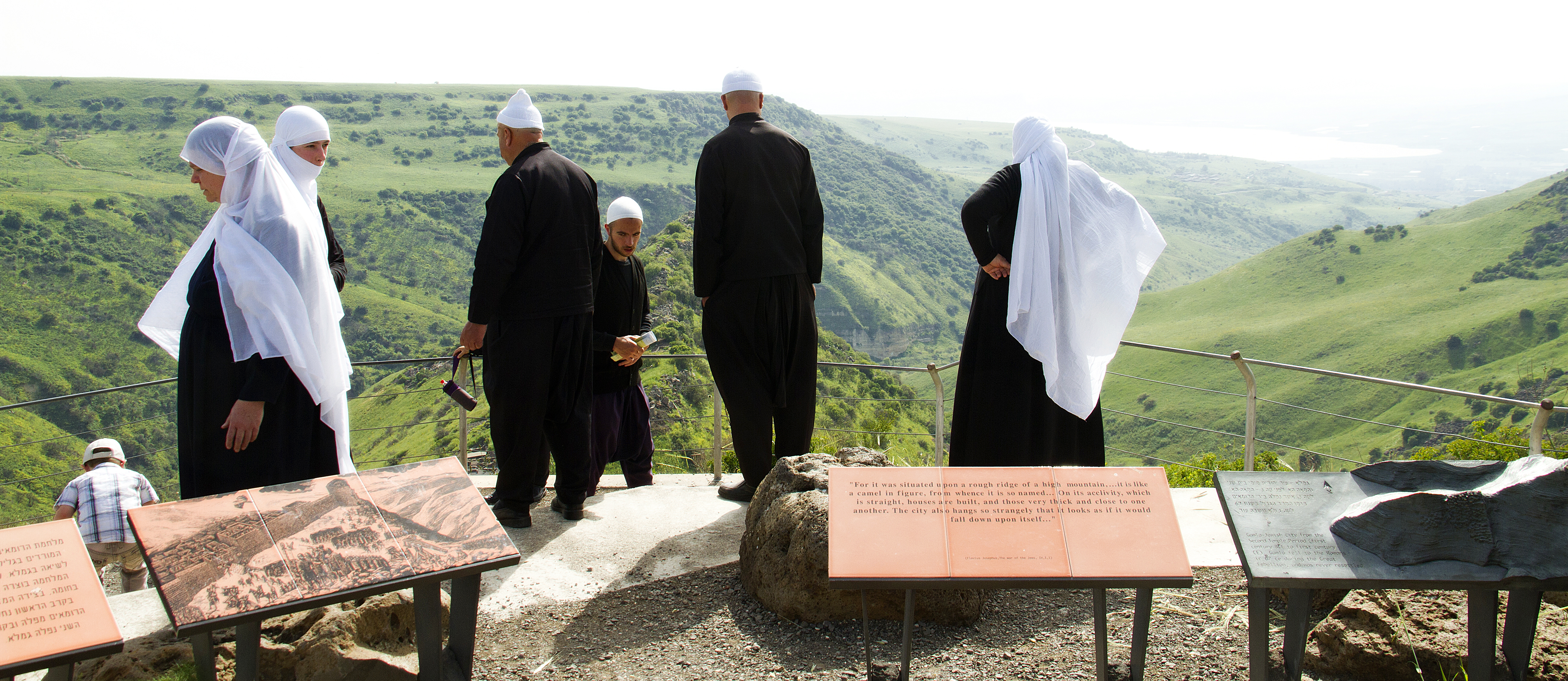
Druze families in Golan Heights: The Druze in Israel and Lebanon have a low fertility-rate.

Druze is a major religion in the Levant region. Druzites or Al-Muwaḥḥidūn are an Arabic-speaking esoteric ethnoreligious group; the number of Druzites worldwide is between 800,000 and one million, with the vast majority residing in the Levant. Even though the faith originally developed out of Ismaili Islam, Druze do not identify as a branch of Islam and view themselves as a separate religion. The Druze faith does not accept converts to their faith, nor practice proselytism. Over the centuries a number of the Druze embraced Christianity, Islam and other religions.

The Druzites reside primarily in Syria, Lebanon, Israel and Jordan. Syria is home to the largest Druzite community in the world, according to a study published by Columbia University, the number of Syrian Druze increased from 684,000 in 2010 to 730,000 in mid of 2018. The Lebanese Druze have the lowest fertility among all age groups after the Lebanese Christians.

According to the Israel Central Bureau of Statistics in 2017, the Israeli Druze population growth rate of 1.4%, which is lower than the Muslim population growth rate (2.5%) and the total population growth (1.7%), but higher than the Arab Christian population growth rate (1.0%). At the end of 2017, the average age of the Israeli Druze was 27.9. About 26.3% of the Israeli Druze population are under 14 years old and about 6.1% of the Israeli Druze are 65 years and over. Since the year 2000, the Israeli Druze community has witnessed a significant decrease in fertility-rate and a significant increase in life expectancy. The fertility rate for Israeli Druze in 2017 is 2.1 children per woman, while the fertility rate among Jewish women (3.2) and Muslim women (3.4) and the fertility rate among Israeli Christian women (1.9).

=== Hinduism ===
Percentage of Hindus by country

Hinduism is the third largest religion in the world. Hindus made up about 17% of the world's population in 2010. According to Pew Research Center 99% of Hindus lived in the Indo-Pacific region in 2010. According to Pew Forum, Hindus are anticipated to continue to be concentrated primarily in the Indo-Pacific region in 2050. Hinduism is the largest religion in the countries of India, Nepal, Mauritius and Guyana. Approximately 90% of the world's Hindus live in India. 79.8% of India's population is Hindu, accounting for about 90% of Hindus worldwide. Hinduism's 10-year growth rate is estimated at 15% (based on the period 1991 to 2001), corresponding to a yearly growth close to 2%. According to a 2017 Pew Research Center survey, between 2010 and 2015 "an estimated 109 million babies were born to Hindu mothers and roughly 42 million Hindus died, meaning that the natural increase in the Hindus population – i.e., the number of births minus the number of deaths – was 67 million over this period".

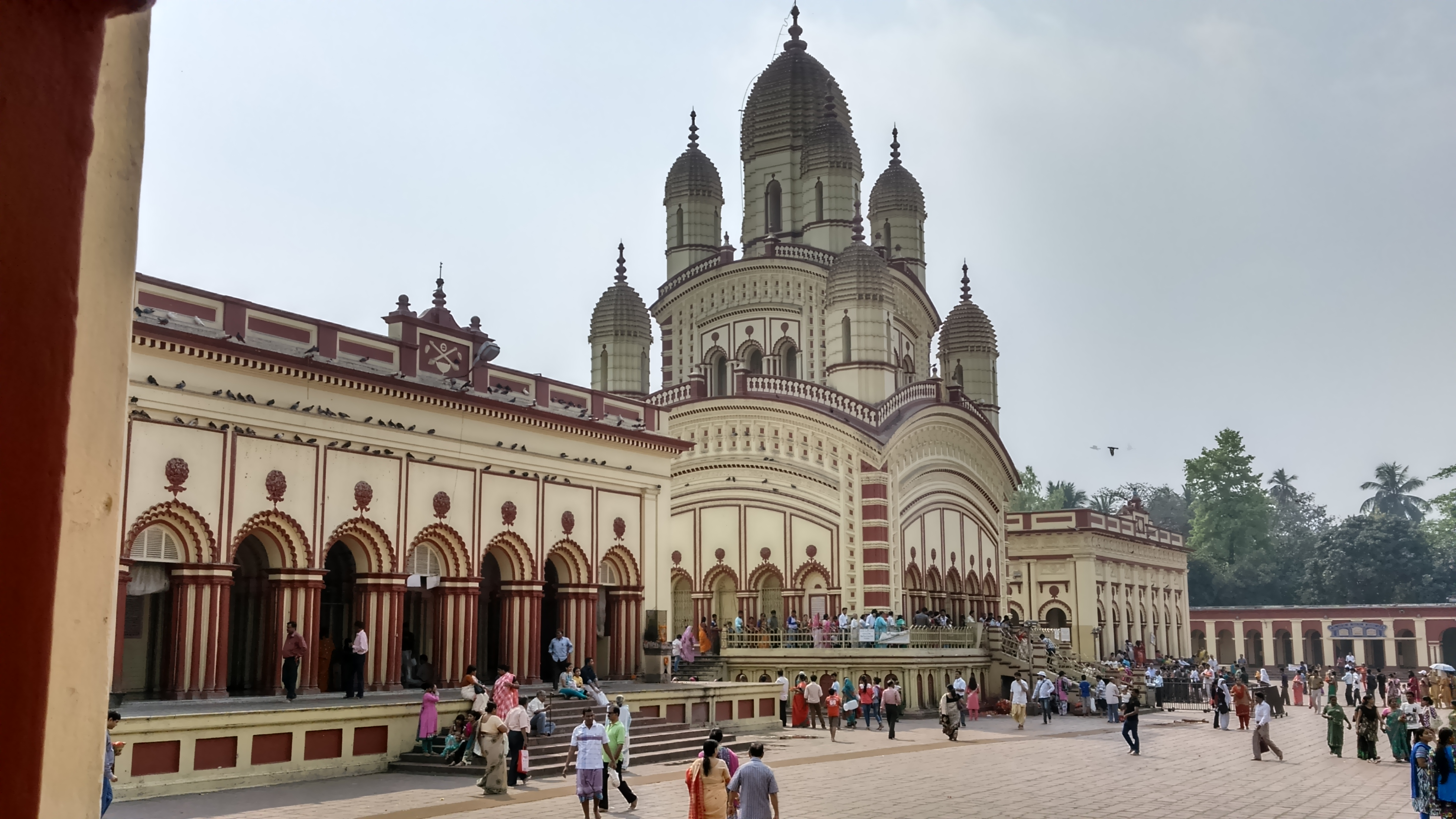
Dakshineswar Bhabatarini Kali temple of Kolkata established by Rani Rashmoni

According to the Carnegie Endowment for International Peace, Hinduism (1.52%) is one of the six fastest-growing religions in the world, with high birth rates in India being cited as the major reasons of the Hindu population growth.

Hinduism is a growing religion in countries such as Ghana, Russia, and the United States. According to 2011 census, Hinduism has become the fastest-growing religion in Australia since 2006, due to migration from India and Fiji.

Generally, the term "conversion" is not applicable to Hindu traditions. According to Arvind Sharma, Hinduism "is typically quite comfortable with multiple religious participation, multiple religious affiliations, and even with multiple religious identities." However, some Hindu groups are known for running religious conversion which has been termed as Ghar Wapsi. According to proponents of Hindutva, such as Sangh Parivar, the process is called "reconversion" of Christians and Muslims who were previously converted.

=== Islam ===
==== Modern growth ====
Islam is the fastest-growing religion in the world due to the high birth rate of Muslims across the world compared to non-Muslims. In 1990, 1.1 billion people were Muslims, while in 2010, 1.6 billion people were Muslims. According to the Carnegie Endowment for International Peace, as of 2007 estimated that the fastest-growing religion of the world to be Islam (1.84%), high birth rates as the reason for the growths. According to the BBC, a comprehensive American study concluded in 2009 that the number of Muslims worldwide stood at about 23% of the world's population with 60% of the world's Muslims living in Asia.

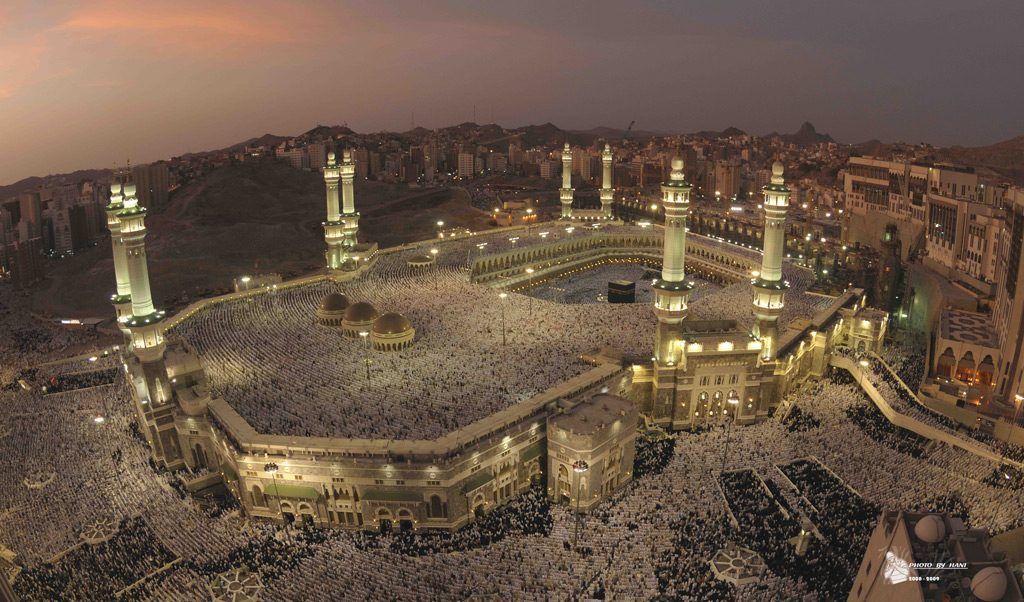
Masjid al-Haram – The biggest mosque in the world

According to the same study "globally, Muslims have the highest fertility rate, an average of 3.1 children per woman – well above replacement level (2.1)", and "in all major regions where there is a sizable Muslim population, Muslim fertility exceeds non-Muslim fertility". From 1990 to 2010, the global Muslim population increased at an average annual rate of 2.2%. By 2030 Muslims are projected to represent about 26.4% of the global population (out of a total of 7.9 billion people). According to a 2019 study by the Pew Research Center; "around the globe, Muslims have higher fertility rates than Christians on average. Muslim women's low educational attainment is a likely factor; demographers find that higher educational attainment among women is tied to lower fertility rates".

On the other hand, in 2010, the Pew Forum found "that statistical data for Muslim conversions is scarce and as per their little available information, there is no substantial net gain or loss of Muslims due to religious conversion. It also stated that "the number of people who embrace Islam and the number of those who leave Islam are roughly equal. Thus, this report excludes religious conversion as a direct factor from the projection of Muslim population growth." People switching their religions will likely have no effect on the growth of the Muslim population, as the number of people who convert to Islam is roughly similar to those who leave Islam. Another study found that the number of people who will leave Islam is 9,400,000 and the number of converts to Islam is 12,620,000 so the net gain to Islam through conversion should be 3 million between 2010 and 2050, mostly from Sub-Saharan Africa (2.9 million). The growth of Islam from 2010 to 2020 has been estimated at 1.70% due to high birthrates in Asia, the Middle East, and Europe. The report also shows that the fall in the birth rate of Muslims slowed down the growth rate from 1990 to 2010. It is due to the fall of the fertility rate in many Muslim majority countries. Despite the decline, Muslims still have the highest birth rate among the world's major religious groups. According to the Carnegie Endowment for International Peace, the World Christian Database as of 2007 has Islam as the fastest-growing religion in the world. A 2007 Center for Strategic and International Studies (CSIS) report argued that some Muslim population projections are overestimated, as they assume that all descendants of Muslims will become Muslims even in cases of mixed parenthood.

According to a 2017 Pew Research Center survey, between 2010 and 2015 "an estimated 213 million babies were born to Muslim mothers and roughly 61 million Muslims died, meaning that the natural increase in the Muslim population – i.e., the number of births minus the number of deaths – was 152 million over this period", and it added small net gains through religious conversion into Islam (420,000). According to a 2017 Pew Research Center survey, by 2060 Muslims will remain the second world's largest religion; and if current trends continue, the number of Muslims will reach 2.9 billion (or 31.1%).

It was reported in 2013 that around 5,000 British people convert to Islam every year, with most of them being women. According to an earlier 2001 census, surveys found that there was an increase of 60,000 conversions to Islam in the United Kingdom. Many converts to Islam said that they suffered from hostility from their families after converting. According to a report by CNN, "Islam has drawn converts from all walks of life, most notably African Americans". Studies estimated about 30,000 converting to Islam annually in the United States. According to The New York Times, an estimated 25% of American Muslims are converts, these converts are mostly African American. According to The Huffington Post, "observers estimate that as many as 20,000 Americans convert to Islam annually.", most of them are women and African Americans. Experts say that conversions to Islam have doubled in the past 25 years in France, among the six million Muslims in France, about 100,000 are converts. On the other hand, according to Pew Research, the number of American converts to Islam is roughly equal to the number of American Muslims who leave Islam and this is unlike other religions in the United States where the number of those who leave these religions is greater than the number of those who convert to it, and most people who leave Islam become unaffiliated, according to same study ex-Muslims were more likely to be Christians compare to ex-Hindus or ex-Jews.

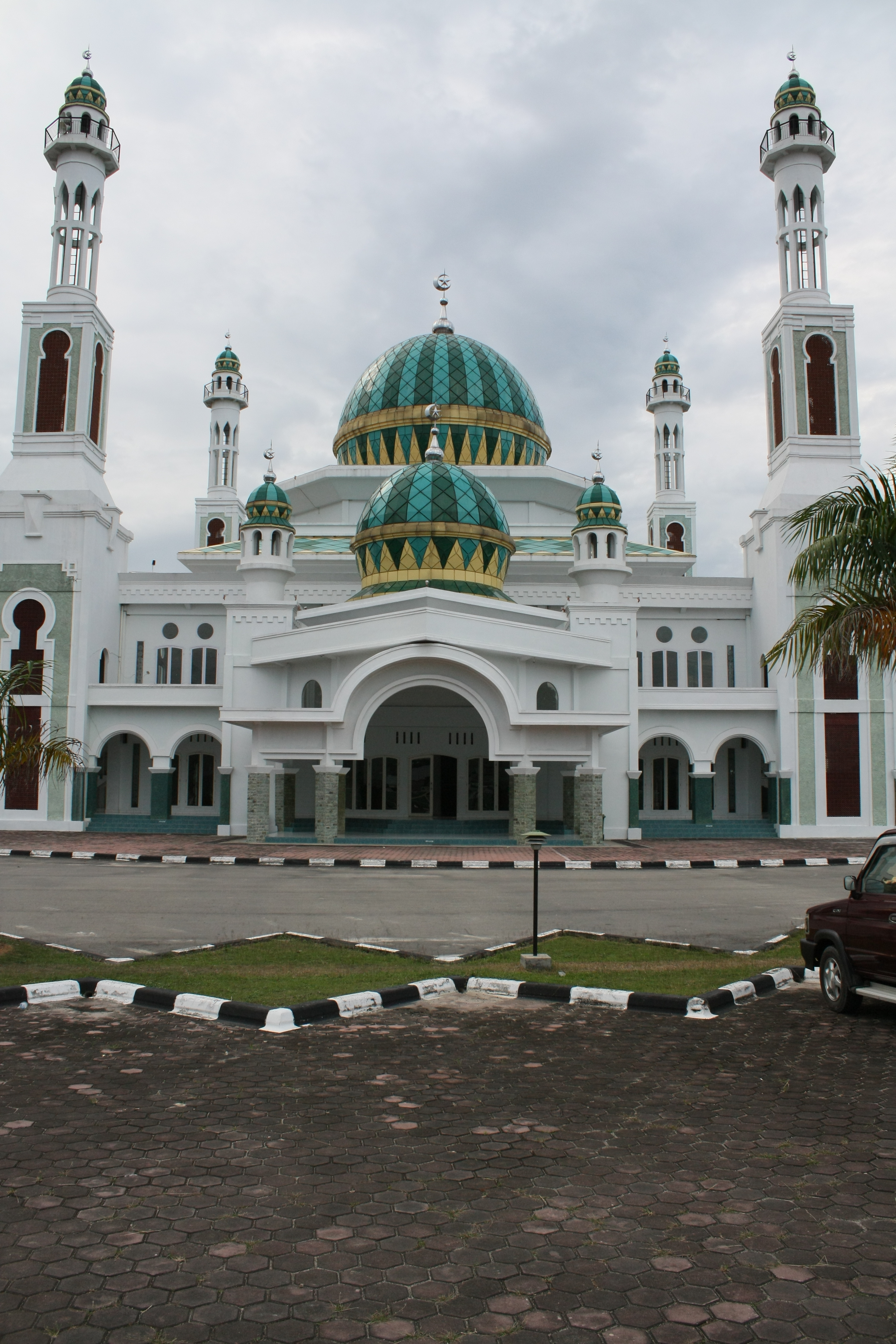
The mosque of Dumai, in Riau. Indonesia has the largest number of Muslims in the world.

Resurgent Islam is one of the most dynamic religious movements in the contemporary world. The Vatican's 2008 yearbook of statistics revealed that for the first time, Islam has outnumbered the Roman Catholics globally. It stated that, "Islam has overtaken Roman Catholicism as the biggest single religious denomination in the world", and stated that, "It is true that while Muslim families, as is well known, continue to make a lot of children, Christian ones on the contrary tend to have fewer and fewer". According to Foreign Policy, high birth rates were cited as the reason for the Muslim population growth. With 3.1 children per woman, Muslims have higher fertility levels than the world's overall population between 2010 and 2015. High fertility is a major driver of projected Muslim population growth around the world and in particular regions. Between 2010 and 2015, with exception of the Middle East and North Africa, Muslim fertility of any other region in the world was higher than the rate for the region as a whole. While Muslim birth rates are expected to experience a decline, it will remain above replacement level and higher fertility than the world's overall by 2050. As per U.N.'s global population forecasts, as well as the Pew Research projections, over time fertility rates generally converge toward the replacement level. Globally, Muslims were younger (median age of 23) than the overall population (median age of 28) as of 2010. While decline of Muslim birth rates in coming years have also been well documented. According to David Ignatius, there is major decline in Muslim fertility rates as pointed out by Nicholas Eberstadt. Based on the data from 49 Muslim-majority countries and territories, he found that Muslims' birth rate has significantly dropped for 41% between 1975 and 1980 to 2005–10 while the global population decline was 33% during that period. It also stated that over a 50% decline was found in 22 Muslim countries and over a 60% decline in Iran, Oman, the United Arab Emirates, Algeria, Bangladesh, Tunisia, Libya, Albania, Qatar and Kuwait.

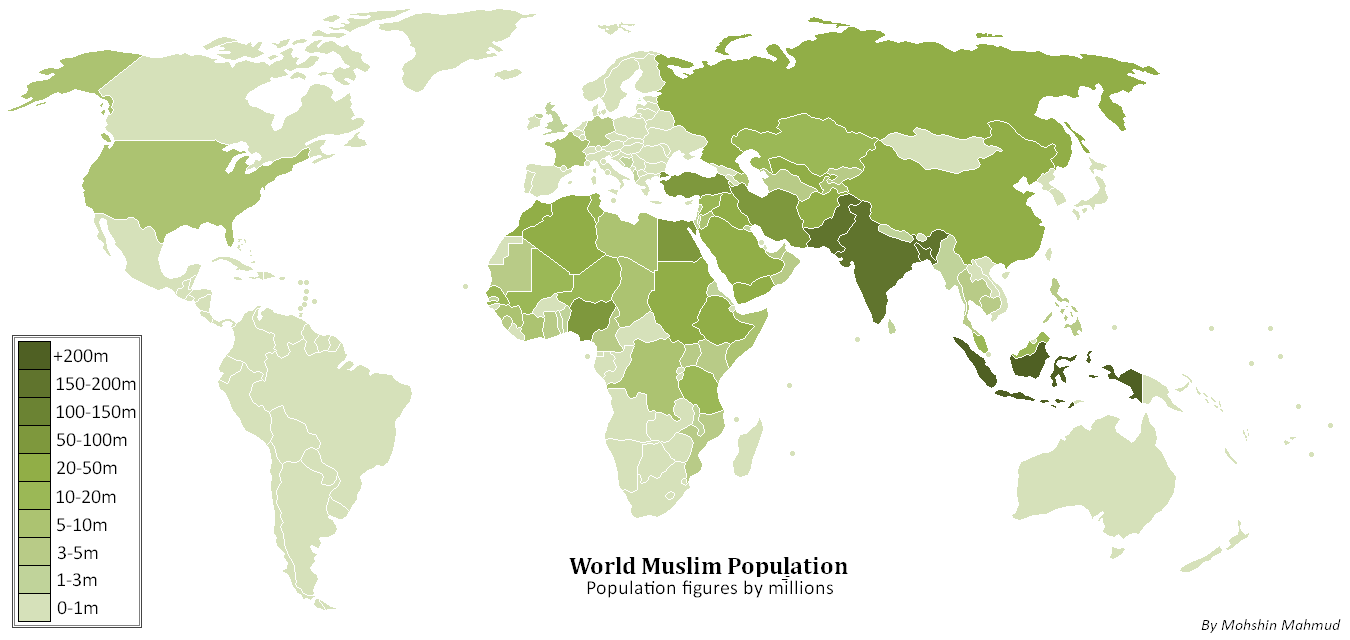
Map of the world by population of Muslims. Although the faith began in Arabia, its three largest communities are found in Indonesia, Pakistan and India (home to 35% of world's Muslim population).

According to the religious forecast for 2050 by Pew Research Center, between 2010 and 2050 modest net gains through religious conversion are expected for Muslims (3 million) and most of the net gains through religious conversion for Muslims found in Sub Saharan Africa (2.9 million). The study also reveals that, due to young age & relatively high fertility rate among Muslims by 2050 there will be near parity between Muslims (2.8 billion, or 30% of the population) and Christians (2.9 billion, or 31%), possibly for the first time in history. While both religions will grow but Muslim population will exceed the Christian population and by 2100, Muslim population (35%) will be 1% more than the Christian population (34%). By the end of 2100 Muslims are expected to outnumber Christians. According to the same study, Muslims population growth is twice of world's overall population growth due to young age and relatively high fertility rate and as a result Muslims are projected to rise to 30% (2050) of the world's population from 23% (2010).

While the total Fertility Rate of Muslims in North America is 2.7 children per woman in the 2010 to 2015 period, well above the regional average (2.0) and the replacement level (2.1). Europe's Muslim population also has higher fertility (2.1) than other religious groups in the region, well above the regional average (1.6). A new study of Population Reference Bureau by demographers Charles Westoff and Tomas Frejka suggests that the fertility gap between Muslims and non-Muslims is shrinking and although the Muslim immigrants do have more children than other Europeans their fertility tends to decline over time, often faster than among non-Muslims.

Generally, there are few reports about how many people leave Islam in Muslim majority countries. The main reason for this is the social and legal repercussions associated with leaving Islam in many Muslim majority countries, up to and including the death penalty for apostasy. On the other hand, the increasingly large ex-Muslim communities in the Western world that adhere to no religion have been well documented. A 2007 Center for Strategic and International Studies (CSIS) report argued that some Muslim population projections are overestimated, as they assume that all descendants of Muslims will become Muslims even in cases of mixed parenthood. Equally, Darren E. Sherkat questioned in Foreign Affairs whether some of the Muslim growth projections are accurate as they do not take into account the increasing number of non-religious Muslims. Quantitative research is lacking, but he believes the European trend mirrors the American: data from the General Social Survey in the United States show that 32 percent of those raised Muslim no longer embrace Islam in adulthood, and 18 percent hold no religious identification. Many Muslims who leave Islam face social rejection or imprisonment and sometimes murder or other penalties. According to Harvard University professor Robert D. Putnam, there is increasing numbers of Americans who are leaving their faith and becoming unaffiliated and the average Iranian American is slightly less religious than the average American. According to Public Affairs Alliance of Iranian Americans, the number of Iranian Americans Muslims decreased from 42% in 2008 to 31% in 2012 according to a telephone survey around the Los Angeles region. A June 2020 online survey found a much smaller percentage of Iranians stating they believe in Islam, with half of those surveyed indicating they had lost their religious faith. The poll, conducted by the Netherlands-based GAMAAN (Group for Analyzing and Measuring Attitudes in Iran), using online polling to provide greater anonymity for respondents, surveyed 50,000 Iranians and found 32% identified as Shia, 5% as Sunni and 3% as Sufi Muslim. (Note: the survey was based on 50,000 respondents with 90% of those surveyed living in Iran. The survey was conducted in June 2020 for 15 days from June 17th to July 1st in 2020 and reflects the views of the educated people of Iran over the age of 19 (equivalent to 85% of Adults in Iran) and can be generalized to apply to this entire demographic. It has a 95% confidence level and a 5% margin of error.) A survey conducted by Pew Research Center in 2017 found that conversion has a negative impact on the growth of the Muslim population in Europe, with roughly 160,000 more people leaving Islam than converting into Islam between 2010 and 2016.

By 2010 an estimated 44 million Muslims were living in Europe (6%), up from 4.1% in 1990. By 2030, Muslims are expected to make up 8% of Europe's population including an estimated 19 million in the EU (3.8%), including 13 million foreign-born Muslim immigrants. Islam is widely considered as the fastest growing religion in Europe due primarily to immigration and above average birth rates. Between 2010 and 2015 the Muslim fertility rate in Europe was (2.1). On the other hand, the fertility rate in Europe as a whole was (1.6). Pew study also reveals that Muslims are younger than other Europeans. In 2010, the median age of Muslims throughout Europe was (32), eight years younger than the median for all Europeans (40). According to a religious forecast for 2050 by Pew Research Center conversion does not add significantly to the growth of the Muslim population in Europe, according to the same study the net loss is (−60,000) due to religious switching.

The Pew Research Center notes that "the data that we have isn't pointing in the direction of 'Eurabia' at all", and predicts that the percentage of Muslims is estimated to rise to 8% in 2030, due to immigration and above-average birth rates. And only two western European countries – France and Belgium – will become around 10 percent Muslim, by 2030. According to Justin Vaïsse the fertility rate of Muslim immigrants declines with integration. He further points out that Muslims are not a monolithic or cohesive group, Most academics who have analysed the demographics dismiss the predictions that the EU will have Muslim majorities. It is completely reasonable to assume that the overall Muslim population in Europe will increase, and Muslim citizens have and will have a significant impact on European life. The prospect of a homogeneous Muslim community per se, or a Muslim majority in Europe is however out of the question. Eric Kaufman of University of London denied the claims of Eurabia. According to him, Muslims will be a significant minority rather than majority in Europe and as per their projections for 2050 in the Western Europe, there will be 10–15 per cent Muslim population in high immigration countries such as Germany, France and the UK. Eric Kaufman also argue that the main reason why Islam is expanding along with other religions, is not because of conversion to Islam, but primarily to the nature of the religion, as he calls it "pro-natal", where Muslims tend to have more children. Doug Saunders states that by 2030 Muslims and Non-Muslims birth rates will be equal in Germany, Greece, Spain and Denmark without taking account of the Muslims immigration to these countries. He also states that Muslims & Non-Muslims fertility rate difference will decrease from 0.7 to 0.4 and this different will continue to shrink as a result of which Muslims and non-Muslims fertility rate will be identical by 2050.

It is often reported from various sources, including the German domestic intelligence service (Bundesnachrichtendienst), that Salafism is the fastest-growing Islamic movement in the world.

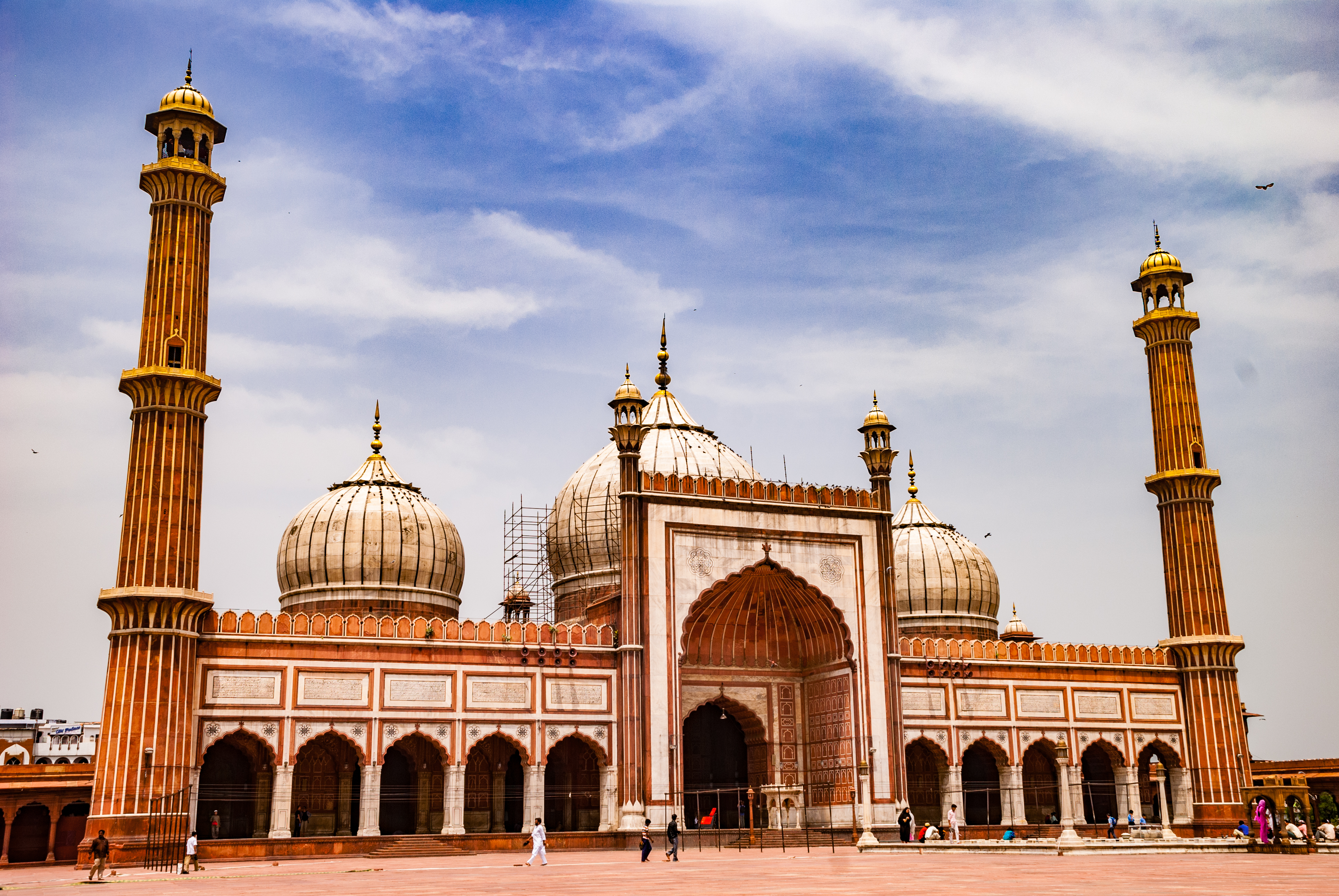
Jama Masjid, Delhi: By 2050, India is projected to have the world's largest Muslim population.

In 2010 Asia was home for (62%) of the world's Muslims, and about (20%) of the world's Muslims lived in the Middle East and North Africa, (16%) in Sub Saharan Africa, and 2% in Europe. By 2050 Asia will be home to (52.8%) of the world's Muslims, and about (24.3%) of the world's Muslims will live in Sub Saharan Africa, (20%) the Middle East and North Africa, and 2% in Europe. As per the Pew Research study, Muslim populations will grow in absolute number in all regions of the world between 2010 and 2050. The Muslim population in the Asia-Pacific region is expected to reach nearly 1.5 billion by 2050, up from roughly 1 billion in 2010. The growth of Muslims is also expected in the Middle East-North Africa region, It is projected to increase from about 300 million in 2010 to more than 550 million in 2050. Besides, the Muslim population in sub-Saharan Africa is forecast to grow from about 250 million in 2010 to nearly 670 million in 2050 which is more than double. The absolute number of Muslims is also expected to increase in regions with smaller Muslim populations such as Europe and North America, due to young age & relatively high fertility rate. In Europe Muslim population will be nearly double (from 5.9% to 10.2%). In North America, it will grow 1% to 2%. In Asia Pacific region, Muslims will surpass the Hindus by the time. In Latin America and Caribbean Muslim population will stay 0.1% by 2050.

In 2010 Indonesia, India, Pakistan, Bangladesh, and Nigeria was home for (47.8%) of the world's Muslims.

==== Historical growth within the Middle East ====
There exist different views among scholars about the spread of Islam. Islam began in Arabia and from 633 AD until the late 10th century it was spread through conquests, far-reaching trade and missionary activity.

Islamic presence grew rapidly under the Caliphate in the first hundred years of its conquests. Expansion under Muhammad, 622–632 Expansion during the Rashidun Caliphs, 632–661 Expansion during the Umayyad Caliphate, 661–750

According to Rodney Stark, Islam was spread after military conquests after Arab armies began overtaking Christian regions from Syria to North Africa and Spain, as well as Zoroastrian, Buddhist and Hindu regions in Central Asia, parts of South Asia and Southeast Asia via military invasions, traders and Sufi missionaries. According to some scholars, the Jizya (poll tax) was the most important factor in the mass conversion to Islam, the tax paid by all non-Muslims (Dhimmis – which translated means "protected persons") in Islamic empires. While other scholars oppose this belief, because the jizya was not of great value, and those who could not pay it were exempt from it, (such as Christians under the Ottoman Empire's authority, Hindus and Buddhists under regime of Muslim invaders, Coptic Christians under administration of the Muslim Arabs, Zoroastrians living under Islamic rule in ancient Persia, and also with Jewish communities in the medieval Arab world) some scholars indicate that some Muslim rulers in India did not consistently collect the jizya (poll tax) from Dhimmis. Under Islamic law, Muslims are required to pay Zakat, one of the five pillars of Islam. Muslims take 2.5% out of their salaries and use the funds give to the needy. Since non-Muslims are not required to pay Zakat nor entitled to benefit from it, they had to support their own poor and in addition they had to pay Jizya if they wanted the same protections the Muslims received. In India, Islam was brought by various traders and rulers from Afghanistan and other places. According to other scholars, many converted for a whole host of reasons, the main statement of which was evangelization by Muslims, though there were several instances where some were pressured to convert owing to internal violence and friction between the Christian and Muslim communities, according to historian Philip Jenkins. However John L. Esposito, a scholar on the subject of Islam in The Oxford History of Islam states that the spread of Islam "was often peaceful and sometimes even received favorably by Christians". In a 2008 conference on religion at Yale University's The MacMillan Center Initiative on Religion, Politics, and Society which hosted a speech from Hugh Kennedy, he stated forced conversions played little part in the history of the spread of the faith. However, the poll tax known as Jizyah may have played a part in converting people over to Islam but as Britannica notes "The rate of taxation and methods of collection varied greatly from province to province and were greatly influenced by local pre-Islamic customs" and there were even cases when Muslims had the tax levied against them, on top of Zakat. Hugh Kennedy has also discussed the Jizyah issue and stated that Muslim governments discouraged conversion but were unable to prevent it.

=== Judaism ===
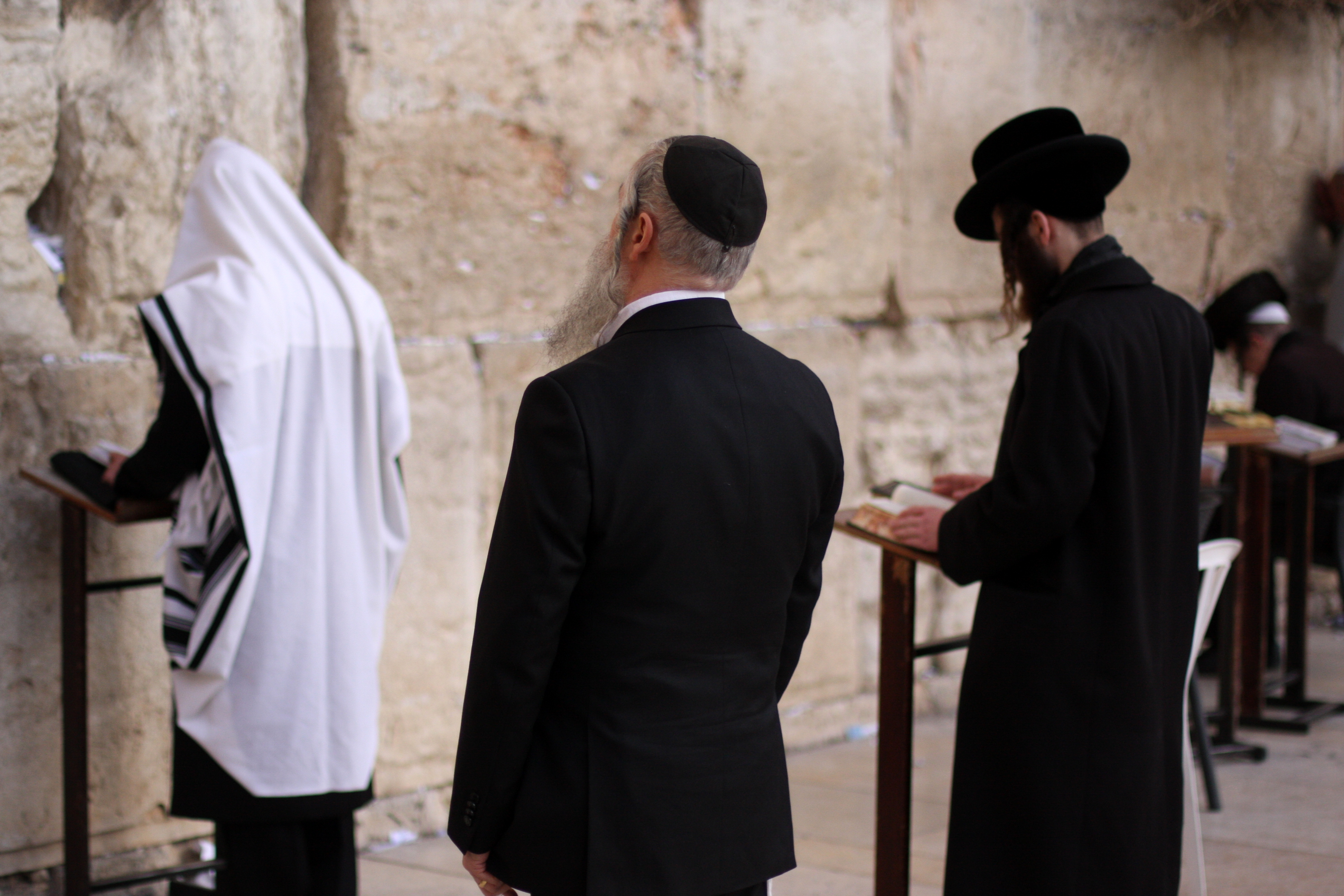
Jews Praying at the Western Wall, Israel: The Haredi and some Orthodox sectors, are becoming a growing proportion of Jews.

Today, the majority of the world's Jewish population is concentrated in two countries, the United States and Israel, in 2013, the United States and Israel were collectively home to more than 80 percent of the global Jewish population, each country having approximately 41 percent of the world's Jews. Israel is the only country with a Jewish population that is consistently growing through natural population growth and extensive immigration, although the Jewish populations of other countries, in Europe and North America, have recently increased through immigration. In the Diaspora, in almost every country the Jewish population in general is either declining or steady, but Orthodox and Haredi Jewish communities, whose members often shun birth control for religious reasons, have experienced rapid population growth.

Orthodox and Conservative Judaism discourage proselytism to non-Jews, but many Jewish groups have tried to reach out to the assimilated Jewish communities of the Diaspora in order for them to reconnect to their Jewish roots. Additionally, while in principle Reform Judaism favors seeking new members for the faith, this position has not translated into active proselytism, instead of taking the form of an effort to reach out to non-Jewish spouses of intermarried couples. Studies have shown that Haredi Jews population is rising rapidly due to the young age and very high fertility-rate, especially in Israel.

The overall growth rate of Jews in Israel is 1.7% annually. The diaspora countries, by contrast, have low Jewish birth rates, an increasingly elderly age composition, and a negative balance of people leaving Judaism versus those joining.

There is also a trend of Orthodox movements reaching out to secular Jews in order to give them a stronger Jewish identity so there is less chance of intermarriage. As a result of the efforts by these and other Jewish groups over the past 25 years, there has been a trend (known as the Baal teshuva movement) for secular Jews to become more religiously observant, though the demographic implications of the trend are unknown. Additionally, there is also a growing rate of conversion to Jews by Choice of gentiles who make the decision to head in the direction of becoming Jews.

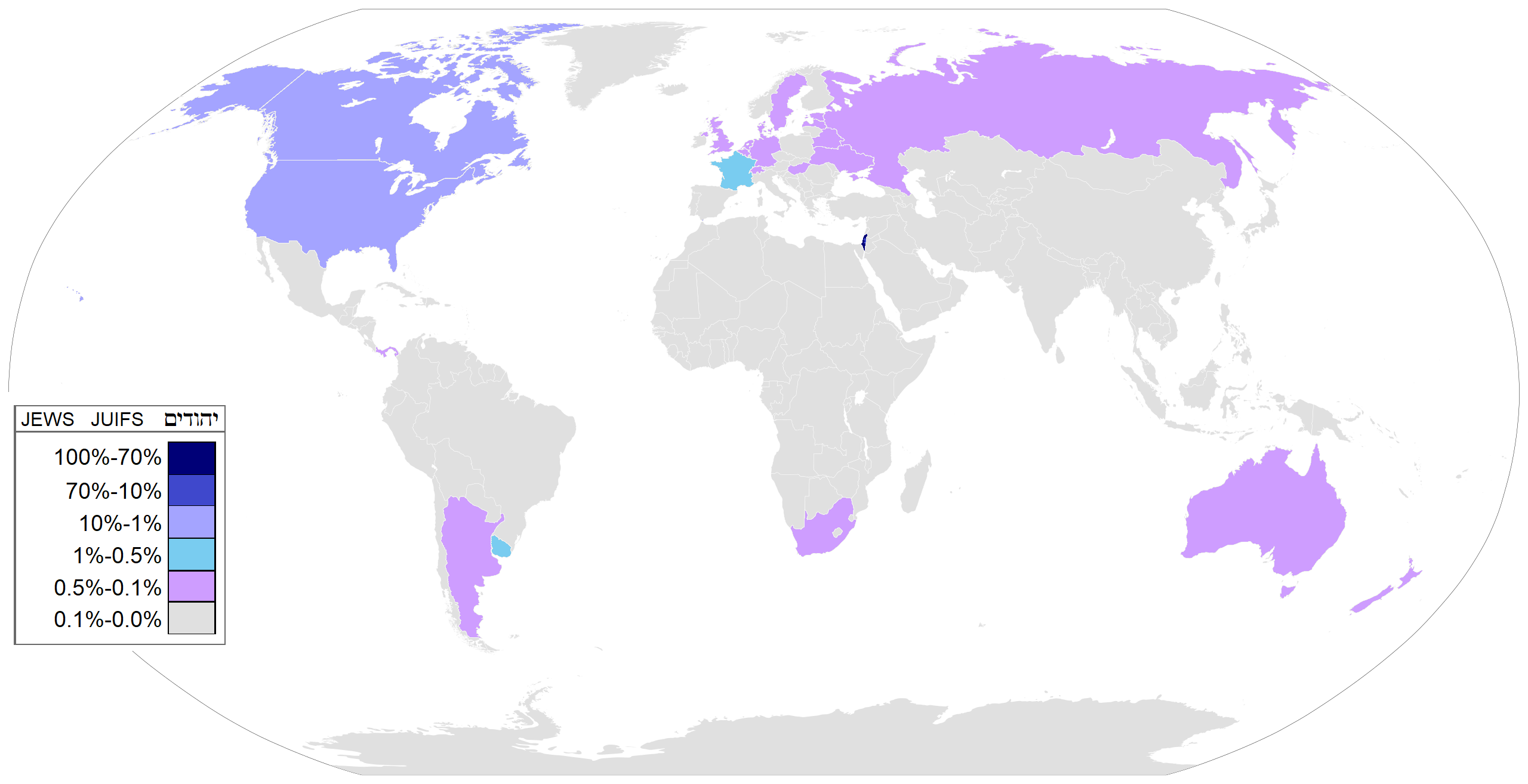
Map of the distribution of Jews in the world

Rates of interreligious marriage vary widely: In the United States, it is just under 50 percent, in the United Kingdom, around 53 percent; in France; around 30 percent, and in Australia and Mexico, as low as 10 percent. In the United States, only about a third of children from intermarriages affiliate with Jewish religious practice. The result is that most countries in the Diaspora have steady or slightly declining religiously Jewish populations as Jews continue to assimilate into the countries in which they live.

In 1939, the core Jewish population reached its historical peak of 17 million (0.8% of the global population). Because of the Holocaust, the number had been reduced to 11 million by the end of 1945. The population grew again to around 13 million by the 1970s, but has since recorded near-zero growth until around 2005 due to low fertility rates and to assimilation. Since 2005, the world's Jewish population has been growing modestly at a rate of around 0.78% (in 2013). This increase primarily reflects the rapid growth of Haredi and some Orthodox sectors, who are becoming a growing proportion of Jews.

According to the Pew Research Center published on 2010, religious conversion may have little impact on the Jewish population between 2010 and 2050; Jews are expected to lose 0.3 million adherents, between 2010 and 2050. According to a 2017 Pew Research Center survey, over the next four decades the number of Jews around the world is expected to increase from 14.2 million in 2015 to 16.3 million in 2060.

=== Baháʼí Faith ===
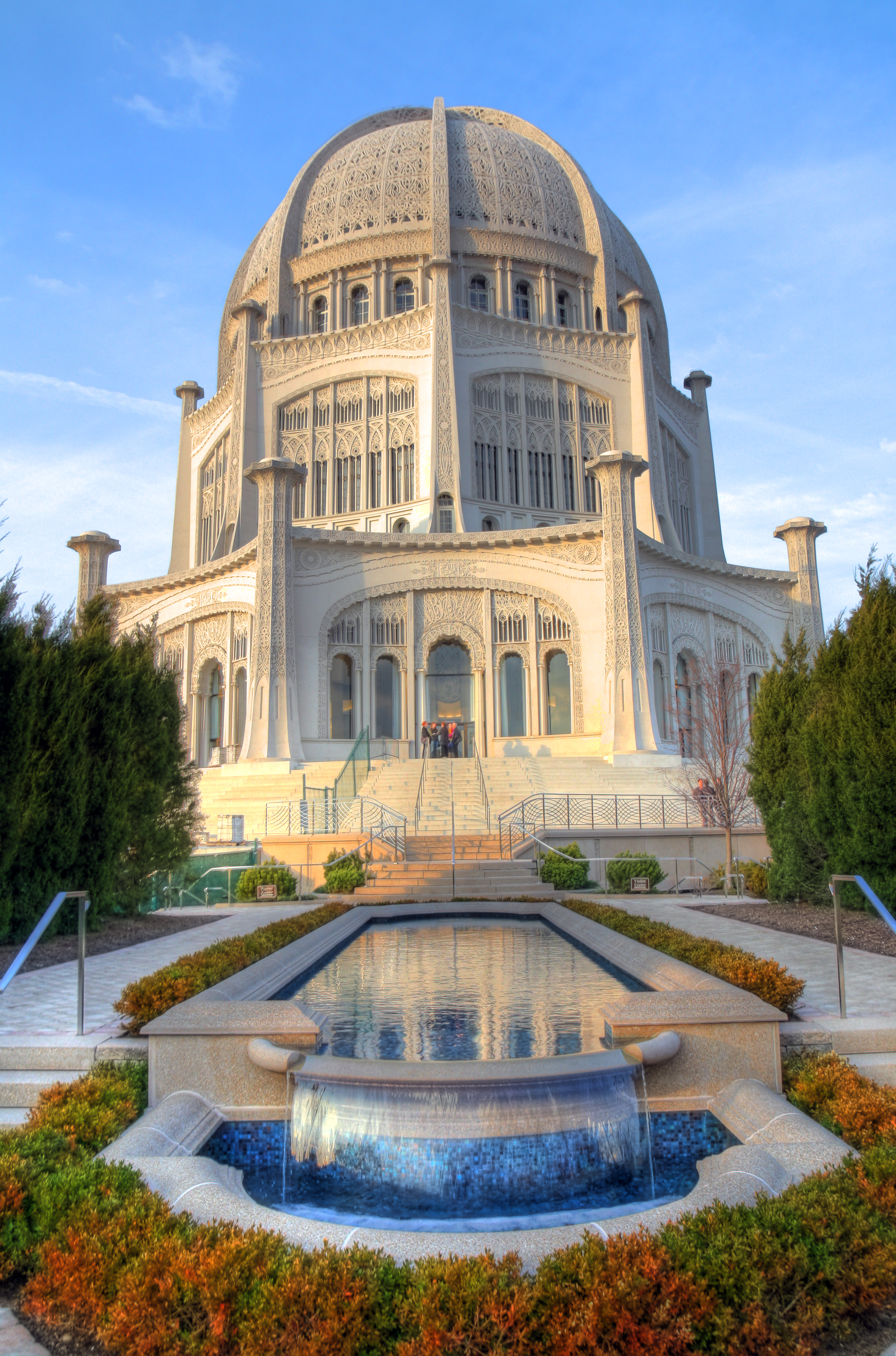
The Baháʼí House of Worship of Wilmette, Illinois

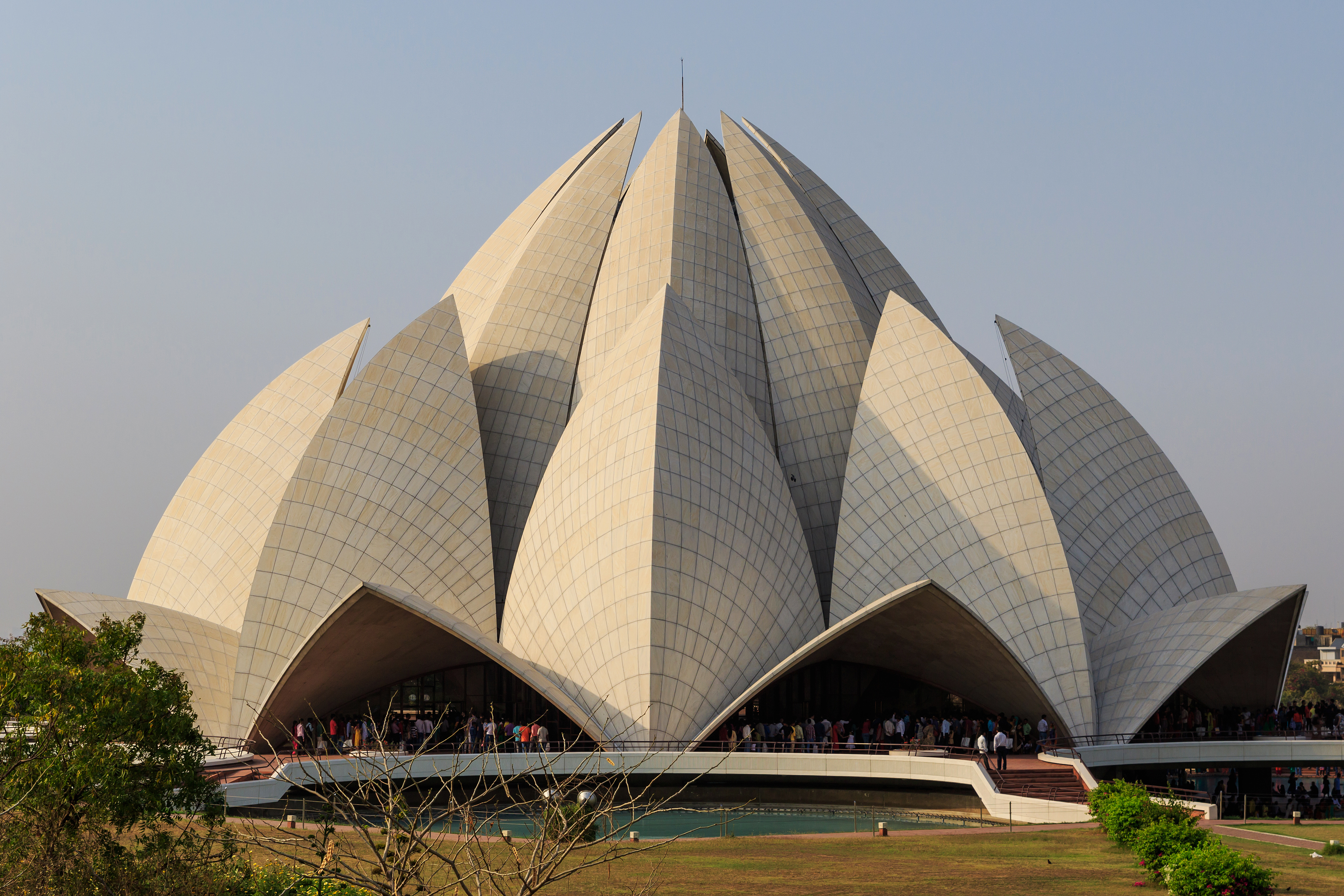
The Lotus Temple, the first Baháʼí House of Worship of India, built in 1986. It attracts over 3 million visitors a year.

As of around 2020, there were about 8 million adherents of the Baháʼí Faith in the world. In 2013, two scholars of demography wrote that, "The Baha'i Faith is the only religion to have grown faster in every United Nations region over the past 100 years than the general population; Bahaʼi [sic] was thus the fastest-growing religion between 1910 and 2010, growing at least twice as fast as the population of almost every UN region."

The largest proportions of the total world Baháʼí population were found in sub-Saharan Africa (29.9%) and South Asia (26.8%), followed by Southeast Asia (12.7%) and Latin America (12.2%). Lesser populations are found in North America (7.6%) and the Middle East/North Africa (6.2%), while the smallest populations in Europe (2.0%), Australasia (1.6%), and Northeast Asia (0.9%). In 2015, the internationally recognized religion was the second-largest international religion in Iran, Panama, Belize, Bolivia, Zambia, and Papua New Guinea; and the third-largest in Chad, and Kenya.

From the Baháʼí Faith's origins in the 19th century until the 1950s, the vast majority of Baháʼís were found in Iran; converts from outside Iran were mostly found in India and the Western world. From having roughly 200,000 Baháʼís in 1950, the religion grew to having over 4 million by the late 1980s, with a widespread international distribution. Most of the growth in the late 20th century was seeded out of North America by means of the planned migration of individuals. Yet, rather than being a cultural spread from either Iran or North America, in 2001, sociologist David Barrett wrote that the Baháʼí Faith is, "A world religion with no racial or national focus". However, the growth has not been even. From the late 1920s to the late 1980s the religion was harassed and banned in the Soviet-led Eastern Bloc, and then again from the 1970s into the 1990s across some countries in sub-Saharan Africa. The most intense opposition has been in Iran and neighboring Shia-majority countries, considered by some scholars and watch agencies as a case of attempted genocide. Meanwhile in other times or places the religion has experienced surges in growth. Before it was banned in certain countries, the religion "hugely increased" in sub-Saharan Africa. In 1989 the Universal House of Justice named Bolivia, Bangladesh, Haiti, India, Liberia, Peru, the Philippines, and Taiwan as countries where growth in the religion had been notable in the previous decades. Baháʼí sources state "more than five million" Baháʼís in 1991-2. However, since around 2001 the Universal House of Justice has prioritized statistics of the community by their levels of activity rather than simply their population of avowed adherents or numbers of local assemblies.

Because Baháʼís do not represent the majority of the population in any country, and most often represent only a tiny fraction of countries' total populations, there are problems of under-reporting. In addition, there are examples where the adherents have their highest density among minorities in societies who face their own challenges.

=== Modern Paganism ===
Modern Paganism—a diverse group of religious movements including Wicca, Heathenry, and Polytheistic reconstructionism—is among the fastest-growing religious categories in the Western world. Sociological studies indicate that its growth is driven primarily by conversion and individual "seeker-ship" rather than birth rates, with a historical annual growth rate estimated at 8.3%.

- Europe: The movement has seen significant institutionalization and legal recognition. In the United Kingdom, the 2021 Census recorded 73,737 self-identified Pagans in England and Wales, an increase from 56,620 in 2011. In Iceland, the Ásatrúarfélagið reported 6,023 members in 2025, or 1.55% of the national population. In Southern Europe, groups such as the Hellenic Ethnic Religion and Reconstructionist Roman religion have attained legal status, with estimates suggesting over 100,000 cultural sympathizers in Greece alone.
- North America: In the United States, where the census does not record religion, academic surveys (such as the ARIS and Pew Research) indicated a rise from roughly 8,000 Wiccans in 1990 to an estimated 1 million to 1.5 million Pagans and Wiccans by the 2020s. Growth is similarly noted in Canada and Brazil, where eclectic and reconstructionist movements have expanded alongside indigenous revivalism.
- Oceania: In Australia, the 2021 Census recorded over 33,000 individuals identifying with various Pagan traditions, continuing a steady upward trend observed since the 1990s.

Growth Factors: Scholars attribute the continued expansion of Modern Paganism to several factors: its emphasis on environmental ethics and "nature worship," its decentralised and non-dogmatic structure which appeals to secularising populations, and its role as a vehicle for the preservation of ethnic and regional heritage.

=== Nonreligious ===
In terms of absolute numbers, irreligion appears to be increasing (along with secularization generally). (See the geographic distribution of atheism.)

Nonreligious population by country, 2010

According to Pew Research Center survey in 2012, religiously unaffiliated (include agnostic and atheist) make up about 18.2% of Europe's population, and they make up the majority of the population in only two European countries: Czech Republic (76%) and Estonia (60%). According to a 2017 Pew Research Center survey, between 2010 and 2015 "an estimated 68 million babies were born to religiously unaffiliated mothers and roughly 42 million religiously unaffiliated died, meaning that the natural increase in the religiously unaffiliated population – i.e., the number of births minus the number of deaths – was 26 million over this period". As for religious conversion, the religiously unaffiliated is expected to have the largest net gains through religious conversion between 2010 and 2050, notably on Europe and Americas. However, religiously unaffiliated is expected to grow slightly due to a decrease in the fertility rate among the religiously unaffiliated population.

The American Religious Identification Survey gave nonreligious groups the largest gain in terms of absolute numbers: 14.3 million (8.4% of the population) to 29.4 million (14.1% of the population) for the period 1990–2001 in the United States. A 2012 study by the Pew Forum on Religion & Public Life reports, "The number of Americans who do not identify with any religion continues to grow at a rapid pace. One-fifth of the U.S. public – and a third of adults under 30 – are religiously unaffiliated today, the highest percentages ever in Pew Research Center polling."

A similar pattern has been found in other countries such as Australia, Canada, and Mexico. According to statistics in Canada, the number of "Nones" increased by about 60% between 1985 and 2004. In Australia, census data from the Australian Bureau of Statistics give "no religion" the largest gains in absolute numbers over the 15 years from 1991 to 2006, from 2,948,888 (18.2% of the population that answered the question) to 3,706,555 (21.0% of the population that answered the question). According to INEGI, in Mexico, the number of atheists grows annually by 5.2%, while the number of Catholics grows by 1.7%. In New Zealand, 39% of the population are irreligious, making it the country with the largest irreligious population percentage in the Oceania region.

According to a religious forecast for 2050 by Pew Research Center, the percentage of the world's population that is unaffiliated or nonreligious is expected to drop, from 16% of the world's total population in 2010 to 13% in 2050. The decline is largely due to the advanced age (median age of 34) and low fertility among unaffiliated or Nonreligious (1.7 children per woman in the 2010–2015 period). Sociologist Phil Zuckerman's global studies on atheism have indicated that global atheism may be in decline due to irreligious countries having the lowest birth rates in the world and religious countries having higher birth rates in general.

According to Pew Forum on Religion & Public Life, by 2050 unaffiliated or nonreligious are expected to account for 27% of North America total population (up from 17.1% as in 2010), and 23% of Europe total population (up from 18% as in 2010). The religiously unaffiliated are stationed largely in the Asia-Pacific region, where 76% resided in that region in 2010, and is expected to be 68% by 2050. The share of the global unaffiliated population living in Europe is projected to grow from 12% in 2010 to 13% in 2050. The proportion of the global religiously unaffiliated living in North America will rise from 5% in 2010, to 9% in 2050. According to the Pew Research Center, religious conversion may have a modest impact on religiously unaffiliated population between 2010 and 2050; religiously unaffiliated are expected to gain 61 million adherents. The largest net movement is expected to be into the religiously unaffiliated category between 2010 and 2050.

=== Sikhism ===
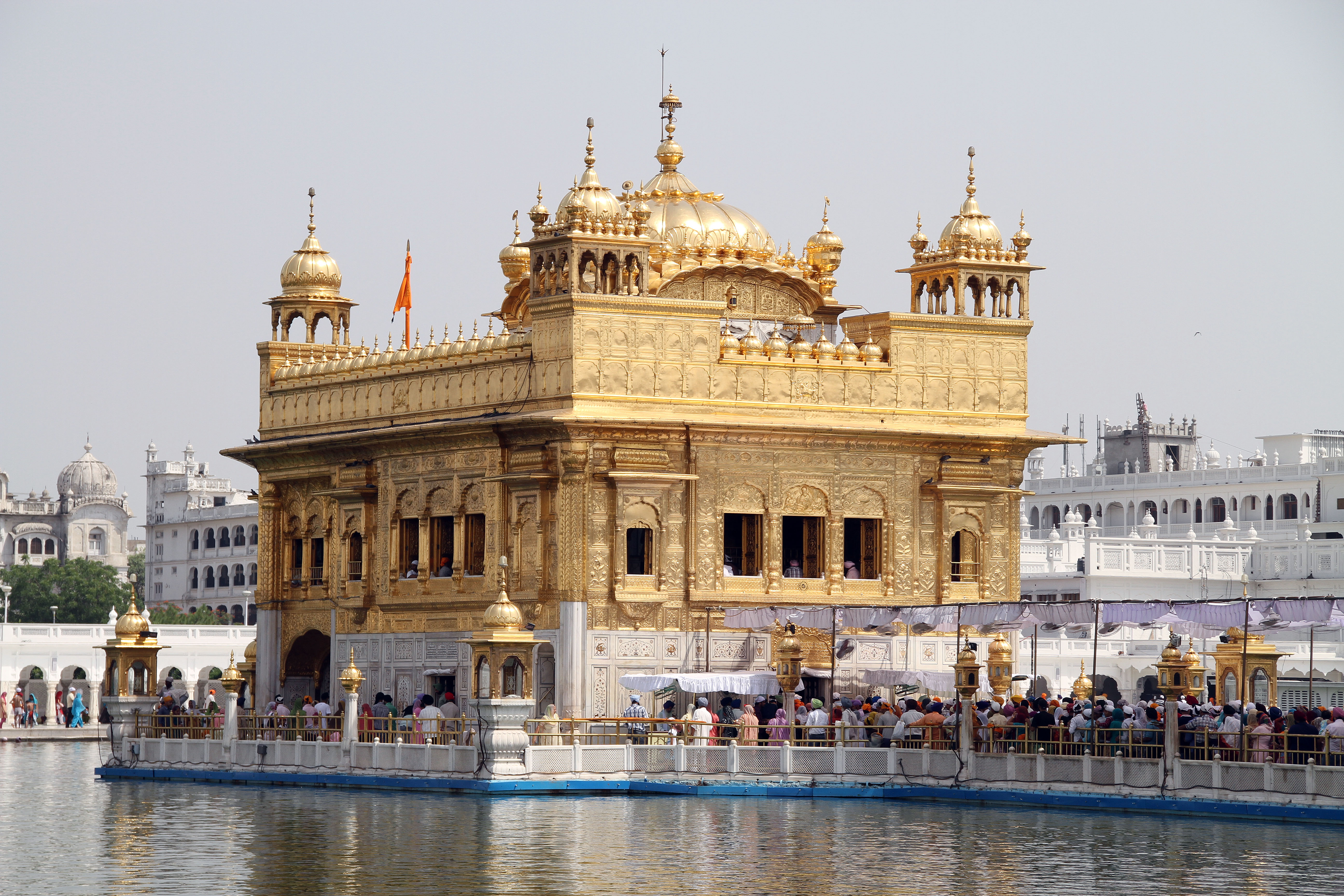
The Golden Temple, an important sacred place in Sikhism

Sikhism was founded by Guru Nanak in the 15th century. The religion began in the region of Punjab in eastern Pakistan and Northwest India. Today, India is home to the largest Sikh population with 1.7% of its population, or about 20 million people identifying as Sikh. Within India, a majority of Sikhs live in the state of Punjab. Outside of India, the largest Sikh communities are in the core Anglosphere, with around 771,790 in Canada (2.1% Sikh), 524,529 in the United Kingdom (0.8% Sikh), 280,000 in the United States (0.08% Sikh), (Note: While the U.S. census does not ask about religion, 70,697 Americans (or 0.02% of the total population) declared Sikh as their ethnicity in the 2020 census. In the 2021 Canadian census, 194,640 Canadians declared Sikh as their ethnicity while 771,790 Canadians declared Sikh as their religion, indicating that the Sikh American population may be around 280,329, or 0.08% of the total population. The U.S. Census Bureau estimated the adult Sikh American population at 78,000 in 2008. The Pew Research Center estimated the Sikh American adult population to be 140,000 and the total population at 200,000 in 2012 while the World Religion Database at Boston University estimated the American Sikh population to be at 280,000 in 2012. Sikh organizations like the Sikh Coalition and American Sikh Congressional Caucus estimate the Sikh American population to be as high as 1,000,000, but do not provide any sources for these figures; 500,000 nevertheless remains the most cited Sikh American population size in news media. With 1% of Asian Americans being Sikh, and 90.7% of Sikh Americans being Asian American, the American Sikh population can be estimated around 280,000-500,000 in 2021.) 210,400 in Australia (0.8% Sikh), and 40,908 in New Zealand (0.9% Sikh).

Primarily for socio-economic reasons (Sikhs being the wealthiest and most educated of India's four major religious groups), Indian Sikhs have the lowest adjusted growth rate of any major religious group in India, at 8.4% per decade (from 2001 to 2011), compared to the national rate of 17.7% per decade. Sikhs have the lowest fertility rate amongst India's four major religious groups, at 1.6 children per woman in 2019-20. The Sikh population has the lowest gender balance in India, with only 903 women per 1,000 men according to the 2011 Indian census, although the sex ratio at birth for Indian Sikhs has rapidly improved from 130 male births per 100 female births in 2001 to 110 male births per 100 female births in 2019-21, now only slightly above the average for India as a whole (108 male births per 100 female births). In contrast to the religion's slowing growth in India, Sikhism is the fastest growing religion in Canada, Australia and New Zealand.

Johnson and Barrett (2004) estimate that the global Sikh population increases annually by 392,633 (1.7% per year, based on 2004 figures); this percentage includes births, deaths, and conversions. The estimated world's Sikh population was over 30 million in 2020, and it will reach 42 million by 2050. It is expected to increase up to 62 million by 2100, given that the anticipated growth rate of 1.7% per year and adding at least 400,000 followers annually. By 2050, according to Pew research center based on growth rate of current Sikh population between (2001–2011), India will have 27,129,086 Sikhs by half-century which will be more than that of any country including the Western world.

=== Wicca ===
The American Religious Identification Survey gives Wicca an average annual growth rate of 29.2% in the United States for the period 1990 to 2001 (from 8,000 to 134,000). According to Anne Elizabeth Wynn of the Austin American-Statesman, "The two most recent American Religious Identification Surveys declare Wicca, one form of paganism, as the fastest growing spiritual identification in America". Mary Jones says Wicca is one of the fastest-growing religions in the United States as well. Wicca, which is largely a "Pagan" religion primarily attracts followers of nature-based religions in, as an example, the Southeast Valley region of the Phoenix, Arizona metropolitan area.

=== Zoroastrianism ===
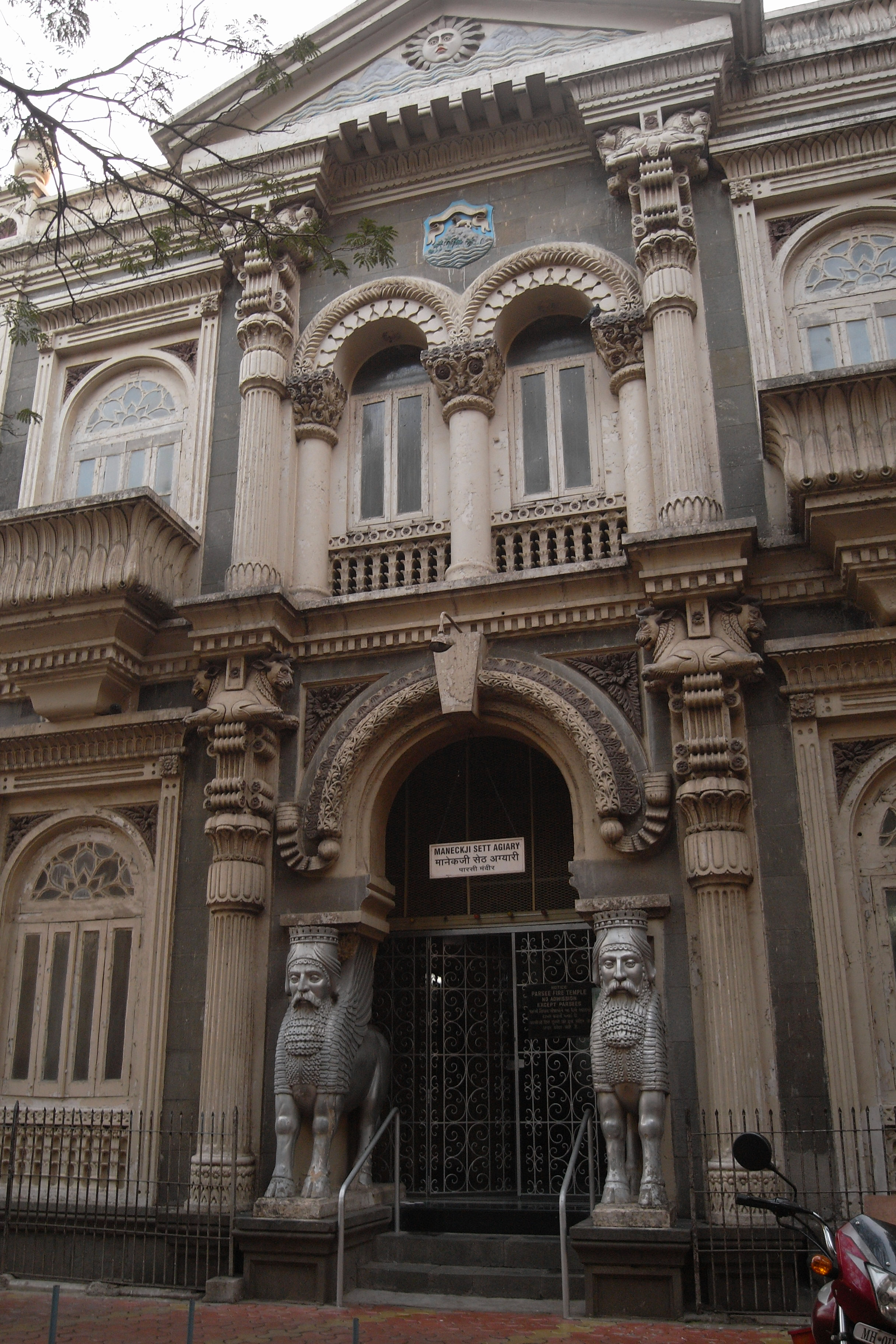
Maneckji Seth Agiary (Parsi place of worship) in Mumbai: India has the largest number of Zoroastrians in the world.

Zoroastrianism was founded during the early Persian Empire in the 6th century BCE by Zarathustra. It served as the state religion of the ancient Iranian empires for more than a millennium, from around 600 BCE to 650 CE, but declined from the 7th century onwards following the Muslim conquest of Persia of 633–654. Zoroastrianism declined as forced conversion increased with the rise of Islam. From the 10th century onwards, Zoroastrians emigrated to Gujarat, India where they found asylum from unjust persecutions and since then are called Parsi, since Indians called Persia Faras and hence named them Parsi. Recent estimates place the current number of Zoroastrians at around 110,000–120,000, at most with the majority living in India, Iran, and North America; their number has been thought to be declining.

India has the world's largest Zoroastrian population who are called Parsis. According to the 2011 Census of India, there are 57,264 Parsis in India. According to the National Commission for Minorities, there are a "variety of causes that are responsible for this steady decline in the population of the community", the most significant of which were childlessness and migration. Demographic trends project that by the year 2020 the Parsis will number only 23,000. The Parsis will then cease to be called a community and will be labeled a 'tribe'. One-fifth of the decrease in population is attributed to migration. A slower birthrate than deathrate accounts for the rest: as of 2001, Parsis over the age of 60 make up for 31% of the community. Only 4.7% of the Parsi community are under 6 years of age, which translates to 7 births per year per 1,000 individuals. Concerns have been raised in recent years over the rapidly declining population of the Parsi community in India.

There has been recent conversions of Kurds from Islam to Zoroastrianism in Kurdistan for different reasons, including a sense of national and/or ethnic identity or for recent conflicts with radical Muslims, which had been enthusiastically received by Zoroastrians worldwide.

The number of Kurdish Zoroastrians, along with those of non-ethnic converts, has been estimated differently. The Zoroastrian Representative of the Kurdistan Regional Government in Iraq has said that as many as 14,000 people in Iraqi Kurdistan have converted to Zoroastrianism recently, with community leaders repeating this and speculating that even more Zoroastrians in the region are practicing their faith secretly. However, this has not been confirmed by independent sources.

== Overall statistics ==
=== Data collection ===
Statistics on religious adherence are difficult to gather and often contradictory; statistics for the change of religious adherence are even more so, requiring multiple surveys separated by many years using the same data gathering rules. This has only been achieved in rare cases, and then only for particular countries, such as the American Religious Identification Survey in the United States, or census data from Australia (which has included a voluntary religious question since 1911).

=== Historical growth ===
The World Religion Database (WRD) is a peer-reviewed database of international religious statistics based on research conducted at the Institute on Culture, Religion & World Affairs at Boston University. It is published by Brill and is the most comprehensive database of religious demographics available to scholars, providing data for all of the world's countries. Adherence data is largely compiled from census and surveys. The database groups adherents into 18 broadly defined categories: Agnostics, Atheists, (Note: Atheism and agnosticism are not typically considered religions, but data about the prevalence of irreligion is useful to scholars of religious demography.) Baháʼís, Buddhists, Chinese folk-religionists, Christians, Confucianists, Daoists, Ethnoreligionists, Hindus, Jains, Jews, Muslims, New Religionists, Shintoists, Sikhs, Spiritists, and Zoroastrians. The WRD is edited by demographers Todd M. Johnson and Brian J. Grim.

World religious beliefs / Non-beliefs by adherents, 1900–2010
Religion	1900		1910		1970		2000		2010		Annual growth rate*	
Religion	Adherents	%	Adherents	%	Adherents	%	Adherents	%	Adherents	%	1910–2010	2000–2010
Christians	558,345,962	34.47	611,810,000	34.8	1,229,308,840	33.22	1,988,966,546	32.37	2,260,440,000	32.8	1.32	1.31
Muslims	200,301,122	12.37	221,749,000	12.6	570,566,719	15.42	1,291,279,826	21.01	1,553,773,000	22.5	1.97	1.86
Hindus	202,976,290	12.53	223,383,000	12.7	462,981,539	12.51	822,396,657	13.38	948,575,000	13.8	1.46	1.41
Agnostics	3,028,450	0.19	3,369,000	0.2	544,299,664	14.71	656,409,731	10.68	676,944,000	9.8	5.45	0.32
Buddhists	126,946,371	7.84	138,064,000	7.9	234,956,867	6.35	452,301,190	7.36	494,881,000	7.2	1.28	0.99
Chinese folk	379,974,110	23.46	390,504,000	22.2	238,026,581	6.43	431,243,766	7.02	436,258,000	6.3	0.11	0.16
Ethnic religion	117,312,635	7.24	135,074,000	7.7	169,417,360	4.58	224,054,933	3.65	242,516,000	3.5	0.59	1.06
Atheists	226,220	0.01	243,000	0	165,156,380	4.46	141,022,510	2.29	136,652,000	2.0	6.54	0.05
New religion	5,985,985	0.37	6,865,000	0.4	39,557,298	1.07	62,942,743	1.02	63,004,000	0.9	2.24	0.29
Sikhs	2,962,000	0.18	3,232,000	0.2	10,668,200	0.29	19,973,000	0.33	23,927,000	0.3	2.02	1.54
Spiritists	268,540	0.02	324,000	0	4,657,760	0.13	12,544,478	0.20	13,700,000	0.2	3.82	0.94
Jews	11,725,410	0.72	13,193,000	0.8	13,901,778	0.38	12,880,910	0.21	17,064,000	0.2	0.11	1.02
Daoists	375,000	0.02	437,000	0	1,734,000	0.05	7,132,555	0.12	8,429,000	0.1	3.00	1.73
Confucianists	840,000	0.05	760,000	0	5,759,150	0.16	7,995,470	0.13	6,449,000	0.1	2.16	0.36
Baháʼí Faith	204,535	0.01	225,000	0	2,657,336	0.07	6,051,749	0.10	7,306,000	0.1	3.54	1.72
Jains	1,323,780	0.08	1,446,000	0.1	2,628,510	0.07	4,792,953	0.08	5,316,000	0.1	1.31	1.53
Shinto	6,720,000	0.41	7,613,000	0.4	4,175,000	0.11	2,831,486	0.05	2,761,000	0.0	−1.01	-0.09
Zoroastrians	108,590	0.01	98,000	0	124,669	0.00	186,492	0.00	192,000	0.0	0.51	0.74
Total Population	1,619,625,000	100.0	1,758,412,000	100.0	3,700,577,651	100.0	6,145,008,995	100.0	6,895,889,000	100.0	1.38	1.20
*Rate = average annual growth rate, percent per year indicated Source: Todd M. Johnson and Brian J. Grim 2013

=== Future change ===
Projections of future religious adherence are based on assumptions that trends, total fertility rates, life expectancy, political climate, conversion rates, secularization, etc. will continue. Such forecasts cannot be validated empirically and are contentious, but are useful for comparison.

==== Future change by conversion ====
According to the Pew Research Center published in 2010, religious conversion may have little impact on religious demographics between 2010 and 2050. Christianity is expected to lose a net of 66 million adherents mostly to religiously unaffiliated, while religiously unaffiliated are expected to gain 61 million adherents. Islam is expected to gain 3.2 million followers, while Buddhists and Jews are expected to lose 2.9 million and 0.3 million adherents, respectively.

Net change of religions due to religious conversion by Pew Research Center between 2010 and 2050
Religion	Switching in	Switching out	Net change
Religiously Unaffiliated	97,080,000	35,590,000	+61,490,000
Islam	12,620,000	9,400,000	+3,220,000
Folk religions	5,460,000	2,850,000	+2,610,000
Other religions	3,040,000	1,160,000	+1,880,000
Hinduism	260,000	250,000	+10,000
Judaism	320,000	630,000	–310,000
Buddhism	3,370,000	6,210,000	–2,850,000
Christianity	40,060,000	106,110,000	–66,050,000

The largest net gains for the religiously unaffiliated between 2010 and 2050 are expected in North America (+26 million), Europe (+24 million), Latin America (+6 million), and the Asia-Pacific region (4 million). Islam is projected to have a net gain of followers in Sub-Saharan Africa (+2.9 million) and Asia-Pacific (+0.95 million), but net loss of followers in North America (-0.58 million) and Europe (-0.06 million). Christianity is expected to have the largest net loss of followers between 2010 and 2050 in North America (-28 million), Europe (-24 million), Latin America and the Caribbean (-9.5 million), sub-Saharan Africa (-3 million), and Asia-Pacific (2.4 million).

Only in recent decades have surveys begun to measure changes in religious identity among individuals. Religious switching is a sensitive topic in India, and carries social and legal repercussions including the death penalty for apostasy in Muslim-majority countries. In China it is difficult to project rates at which Christianity, Islam and Buddhism are gaining converts, nor what are the retention rates among converts.

These forecasts lack reliable data on religious conversion in China, but according to media reports and expert assessments, it is possible that the rapid growth of Christianity in China may maintain, or even increase, the current numerical advantage of Christianity as the largest religion in the world and may negatively affect the growth of the Religiously Unaffiliated. This scenario (Chinese scenario) is based primarily on sensitivity tests.

According to Pew Research Center surveys of nearly 80,000 people across 36 countries, individuals raised as Christians or Buddhists are more likely to abandon their religion later in life, often becoming unaffiliated and not adhering to any faith. In contrast, religions such as Hinduism and Islam have not been significantly affected by religious switching. According to the study, although these figures indicate religious trends in the 36 countries surveyed, they may not accurately represent the global population as a whole.

In nearly all of the 27 countries analyzed—mostly in the West— the majorities of adults who were raised Christian still identify as Christian today, yet more people have left Christianity than have joined it in many of these countries. Many of those who have converted to Christianity say they were raised as Buddhists or with no religious background. In contrast, most individuals who have left Christianity now identify as religiously unaffiliated.

Meanwhile, in countries such as Singapore and South Korea and Argentina, the highest share of people report being raised with no religious affiliation but now identify with a religion—mostly Christianity. In 13 countries analyzed, most individuals who have left Islam either no longer identify with any religion or now identify as Christian. Except in the United States, where more than a quarter of those raised as Muslims have left Islam, in most of the 13 countries surveyed, only a very small percentage of adults have either left or converted to Islam.

Among the six surveyed countries, Buddhism has declined in some due to religious switching, such as in Japan and South Korea and Singapore, while in others, it has remained relatively stable, such as in Thailand and Sri Lanka. Both Israel and the U.S. show strong levels of Jewish identity retention. In Israel, almost all individuals who grew up Jewish continue to identify as such, while in the U.S., 76% of those with a Jewish upbringing still consider themselves Jewish.

== See also ==
- History of religion
- List of religious populations
- Major religious groups
  - Trends in adherence
