= Gavin Jones =

Gavin Jones may refer to:

- Gavin Jones (demographer) (1940–2022), Australian demographer
- Gavin Jones (media executive) (1966–2014), Australian media producer
- Gavin Jones (rugby league), Australian former rugby league footballer
- Gavin Jones (squash player) (born 1980), Welsh squash player

== See also ==
- Gavin Price-Jones, rugby league footballer for Wales
