= Gavin Jones (demographer) =

Australian demographer

Gavin Willis Jones FASSA (21 November 1940 – 27 August 2022) was an Australian demographer. He was one of the world's leading scholars on family demography and was one of the most cited scholars on the demography of Asia. He was elected a Fellow of the Academy of the Social Sciences in Australia in 1983.
