= Islam in Taiwan =

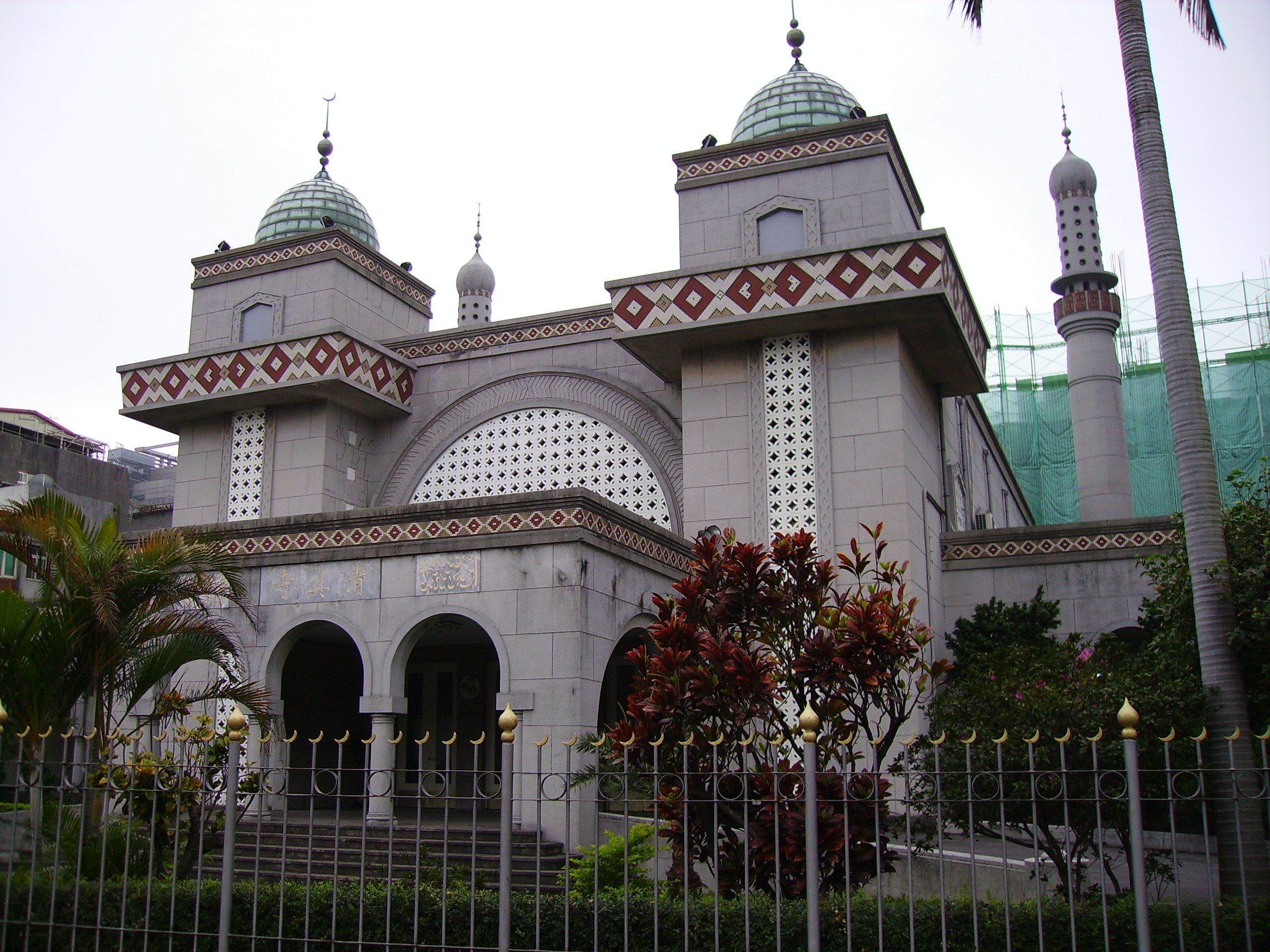
Taipei Grand Mosque in Da'an District, Taipei, the first and largest mosque in Taiwan

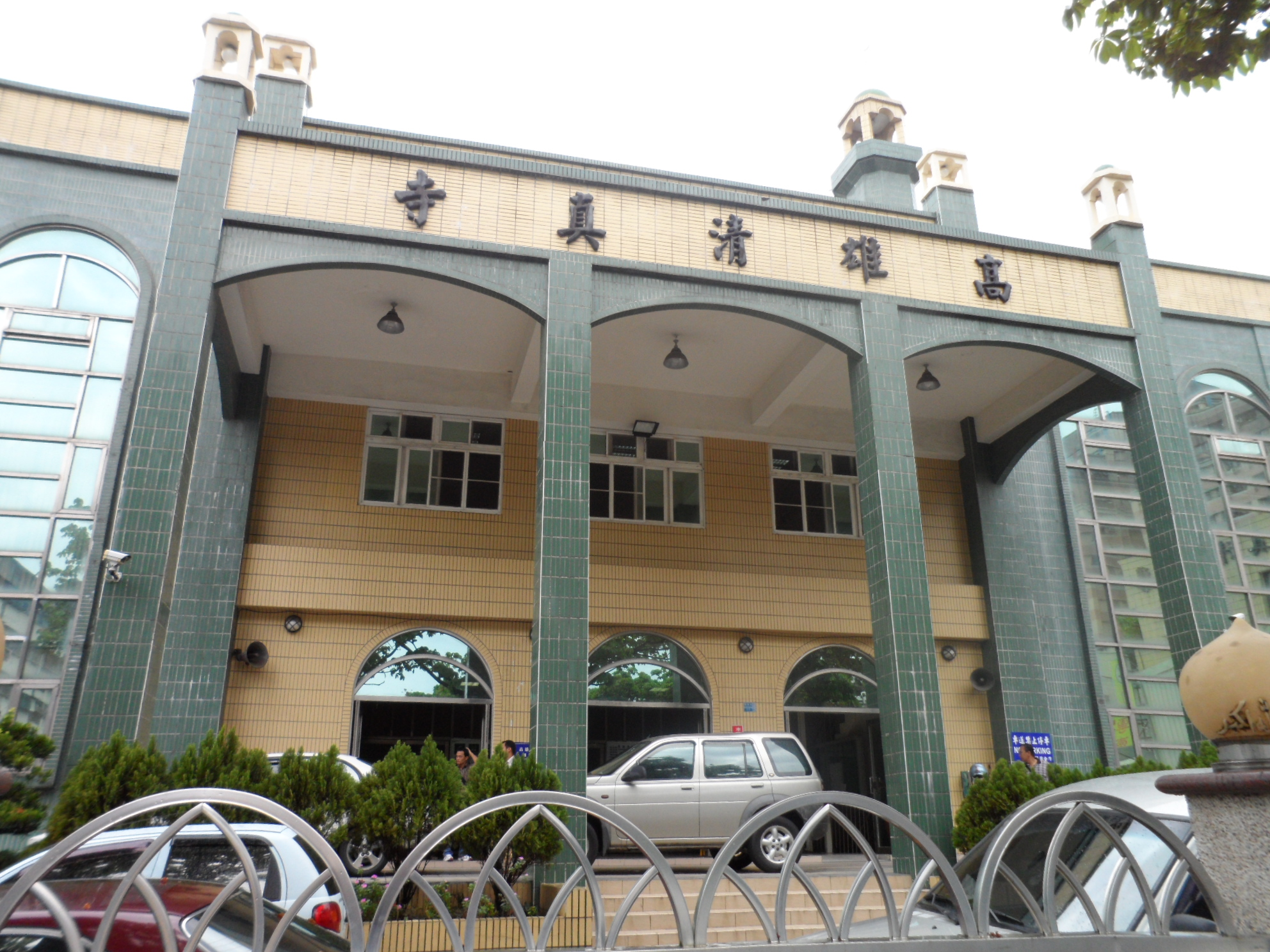
Kaohsiung Mosque in Lingya District, Kaohsiung, the second mosque in Taiwan

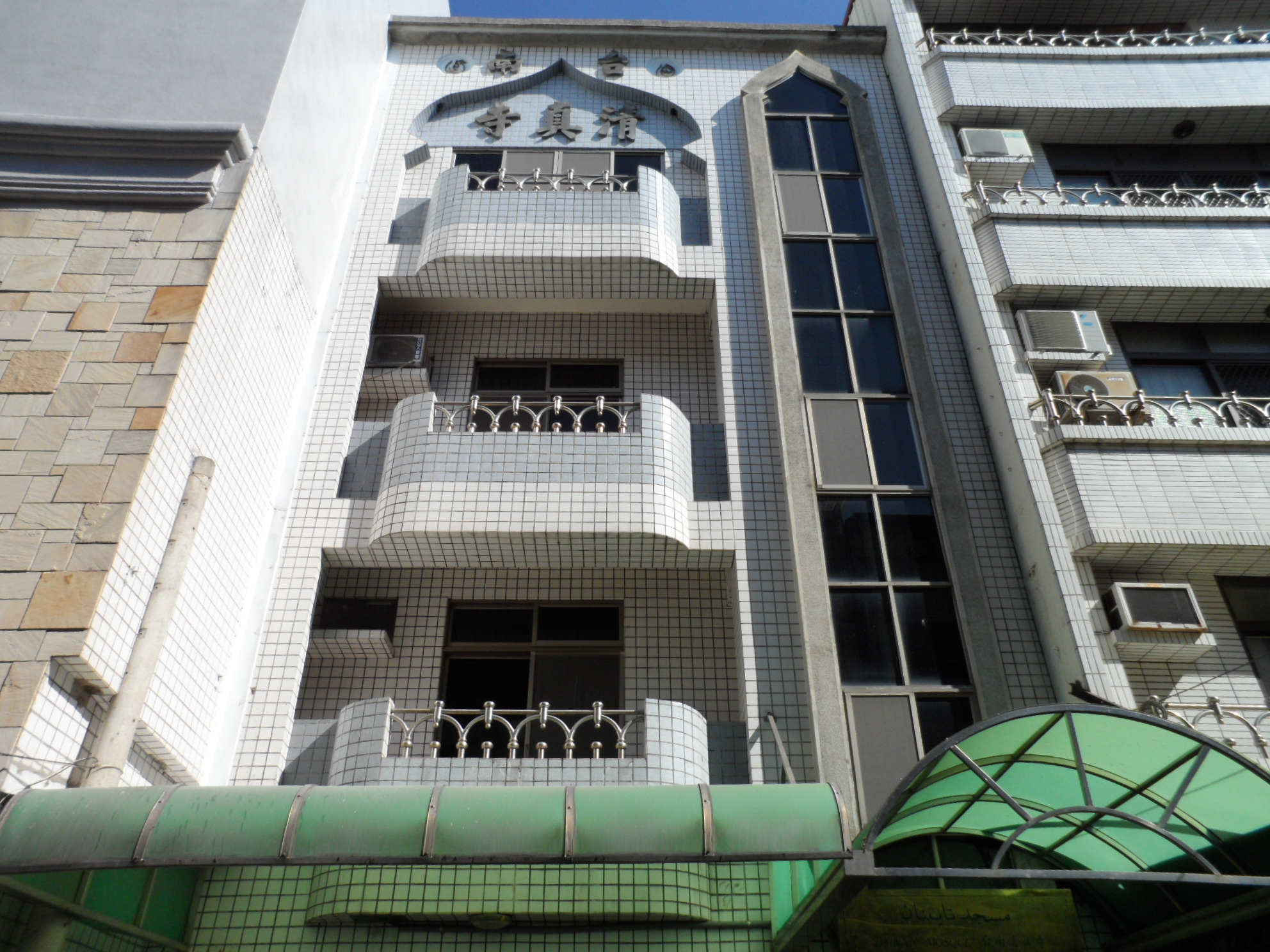
Tainan Mosque in East District, Tainan, the sixth mosque in Taiwan

Islam is a minor religion in Taiwan and it represents about 0.25% of the population. There are around 60,000 Muslims in Taiwan, in which about 90% belong to the Hui ethnic group. There are also more than 250,000 foreign Muslims working in Taiwan from Indonesia, Malaysia, Brunei, Sri Lanka, Thailand and the Philippines, as well as other nationalities from more than 30 countries. As of 2018, there are eleven mosques in Taiwan, with the most notable being the Taipei Grand Mosque, the oldest and largest one.

Taiwanese Muslims are mostly descended from Chinese Muslims in mainland China, and are Sunni Muslims mostly belonging to the Hanafi school. Nevertheless, they practically face no problem at all with other groups of Muslim schools. Differences are more a matter of mutual curiosity.

== The spread of Islam to Taiwan ==
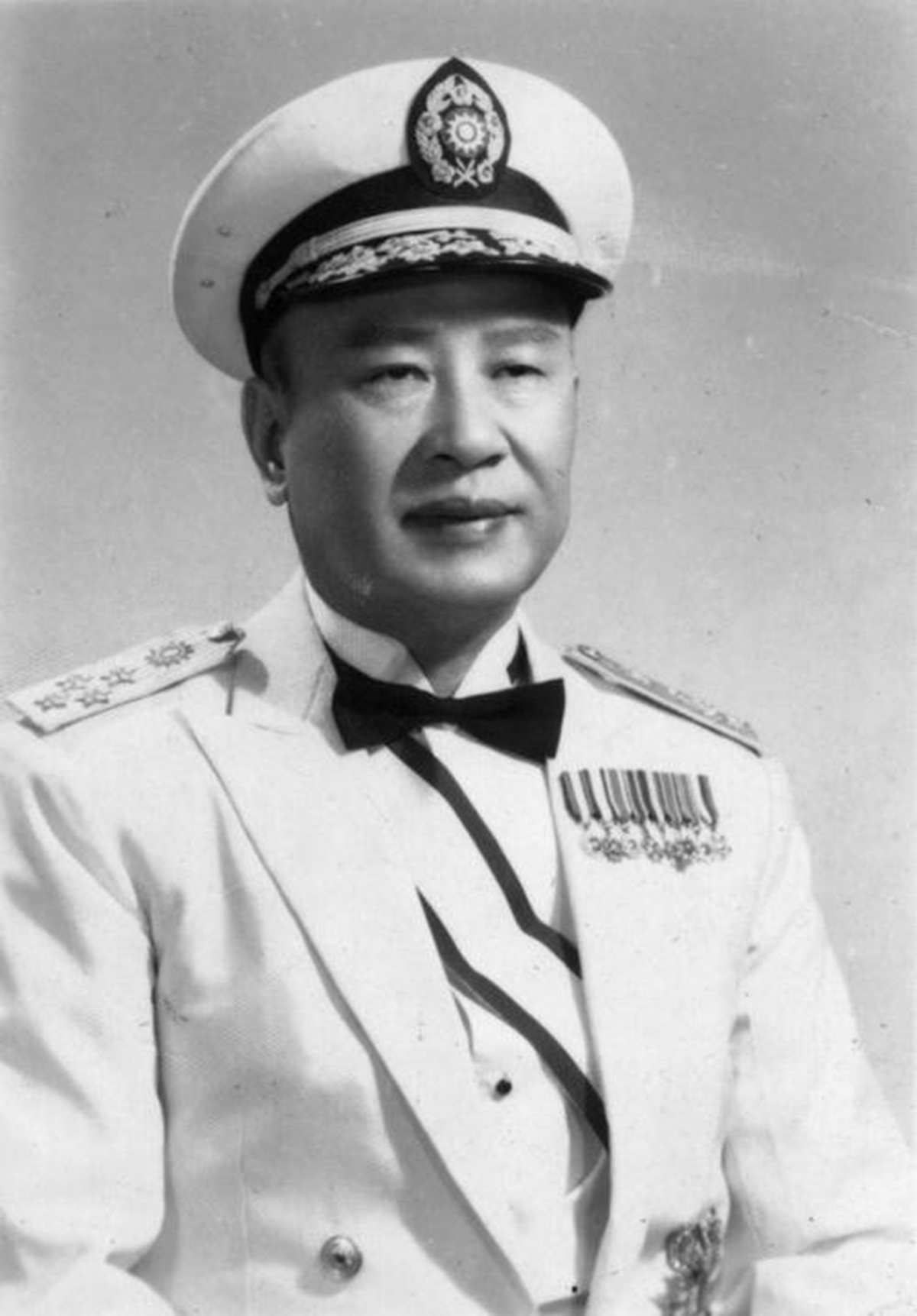
KMT General Bai Chongxi

=== First wave of migration ===
Islam is believed to have first reached Taiwan in the 17th century when soldiers from the southern Chinese coastal province of Fujian accompanied Koxinga on his invasion of Taiwan to oust the Dutch from the southern city of Tainan in 1661 and established Kingdom of Tungning in Taiwan. Earlier before that, Islam is believed to have been brought to Taiwan by Admiral Zheng He in the 15th century. Many of them were Muslims and they brought their families with them to the island and settled in several settlements, such as Lukang, Tamsui etc. They built a Quanzhou-styled mosque in Taiwan. Although the mosque no longer exists now, relics from the building still exist. These people are believed to be the first Muslim settlers on the island. Their descendants, however, became assimilated into Taiwanese society, adopting local customs and religions.

According to Professor Lien Ya Tang (traditional Chinese: 連雅堂; simplified Chinese: 连雅堂; pinyin: Lián Yǎtáng) in his book History of Taiwan (traditional Chinese: 臺灣通史; simplified Chinese: 台湾通史; pinyin: Táiwān Tōngshǐ) (1918), there were few Muslims on the island, most of whom were from other provinces in China. There was no spread of Islam and no mosques were built.

The final traces of the first Muslims migration to Taiwan were wiped out during the Japanese colonial rule of Taiwan in 1895–1945. The Japanese government forbid the Taiwanese from practising foreign religions, which resulted in many of the local people practising their faith in secret. The last imam that came from China to Taiwan was in 1922. After the handover of Taiwan from Japan to the Republic of China in October 1945, the tradition of sending imams from China resumed again in 1948.

The Chinese Muslim Association (CMA) put a number figure for all of the people who come from the first wave of Islam migration to be around 20,000 people. Despite efforts of by the association to resuscitate Islam among them, basically they no longer practice Islam anymore in their daily life.

==== Yunlin ====
In Taiwan, one branch of this Ting (Chinese: 丁; pinyin: Dīng) family descended from Ajall Shams al-Din Omar resides in Taixi Township, Yunlin County. They trace their descent through him via the Quanzhou Ding family of Fujian. Even as they were pretending to be Han Chinese in Fujian, they still practiced Islam when they originally came to Taiwan 200 years ago, building a mosque, but eventually became Buddhist or Daoist. The mosque is now the Ding families Daoist temple.

==== Changhua ====
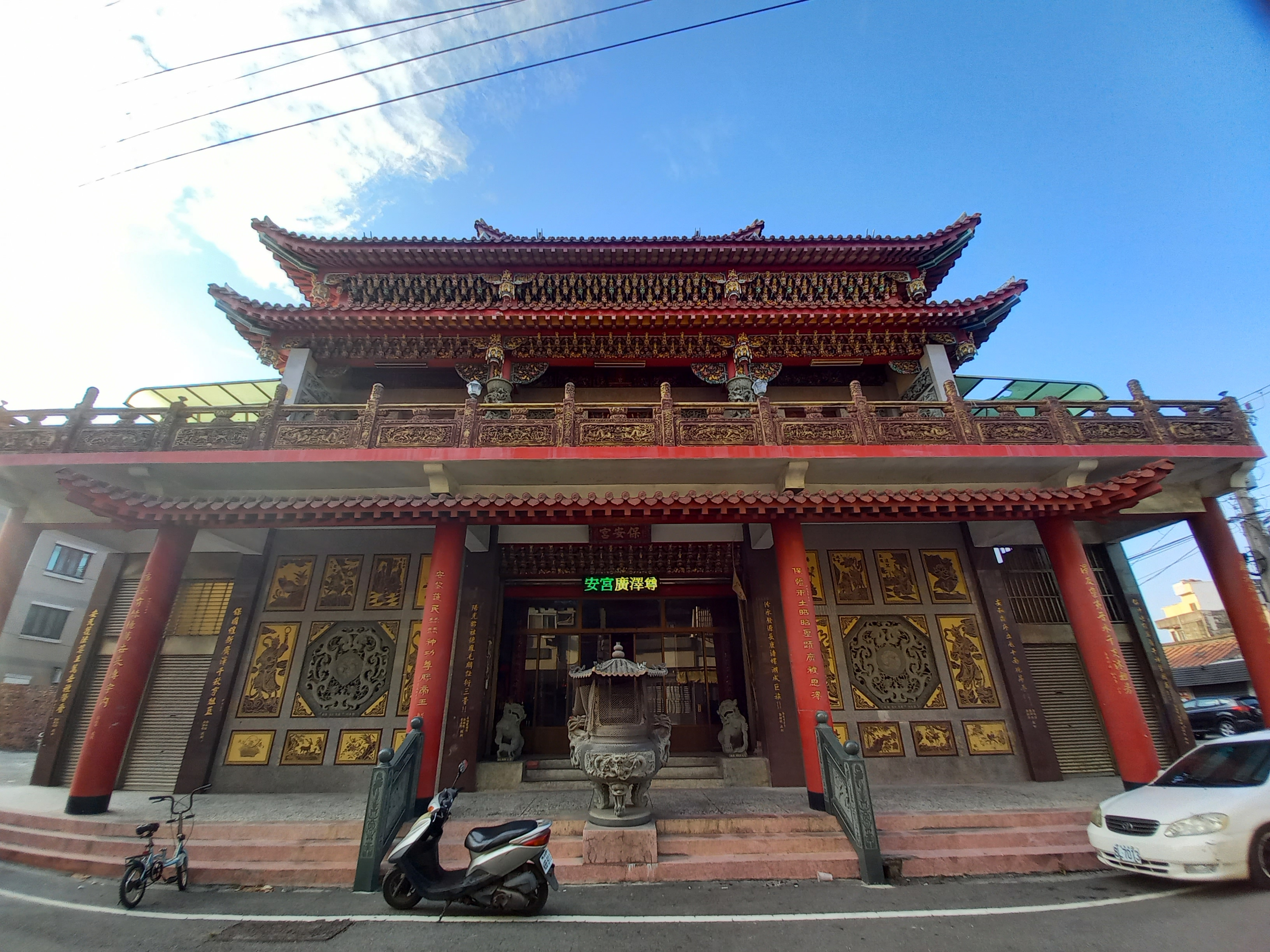
The Kuo Family Ancestral Temple in Lukang which used to be the former site of a mosque

In Changhua County, there is another Ting family which resides in Lukang Township. They trace their Muslim ancestors from the family books, originated from Quanzhou, Fujian as well. It was recorded that there was a mosque and bath well built in this town in 1725 run by the Kuo family. However, many of the ancestors stopped practicing Islam once they arrived in Taiwan due to public pressure and the well also disappeared shortly before World War II. Their ancestors left some hints to the current generations of their Muslim heritage, which is shown in their siheyuan-shape of their house, resembling a square-shaped house with courtyard in the middle, different from the ordinary Taiwanese houses which is sanheyuan, a U-shaped house with courtyard in the middle. From the bird's-eye view, siheyuan houses resemble the Chinese character hui (Chinese: 回), which represents the Hui people, a minority Muslim people in northwest China. The families gained their fame and wealth by running business in Lukang.

Also in Lukang, there are also descendants of Hui who came with Koxinga who no longer observe Islam, the Taiwan branch of the Kuo (Chinese: 郭; pinyin: Guō) family which is not Muslim and follows traditional Chinese cultures, but still does not offer pork on Fridays nor offering it to their ancestral shrines. They also like to keep their heads covered during rituals. The CMA counts these people as Muslims. Based on certain historic documents, it was reported that there used to be a mosque in Beitou (traditional Chinese: 北頭; simplified Chinese: 北头; pinyin: Běitóu) area in Lukang. According to some studies, the former site of the Kuo family ancestral temple (Chinese: 鹿港郭厝保安宮; pinyin: Lùgǎng Guōcuò Bǎo'ān Gōng) would have been the site for the mosque few hundred years ago.

==== Keelung ====
There are also two families in Keelung whose ancestral shrine contains a Quran and examples of Arabic script, although they did not understand the significance of these objects until contacts were made recently with the newly arrived Muslims in Taiwan. Those two families are not Muslims and do not read Arabic, but they honor a book held sacred by their forebears.

==== Tainan ====
Similarly, two or three families in Tainan are reported to observe funeral customs more associated with Islam rather than Taoism or Buddhism, such as ceremonial washing of the body and wrapping it in white cloth, although in other aspects of their life they are normal Taiwanese.

=== Second wave of migration ===
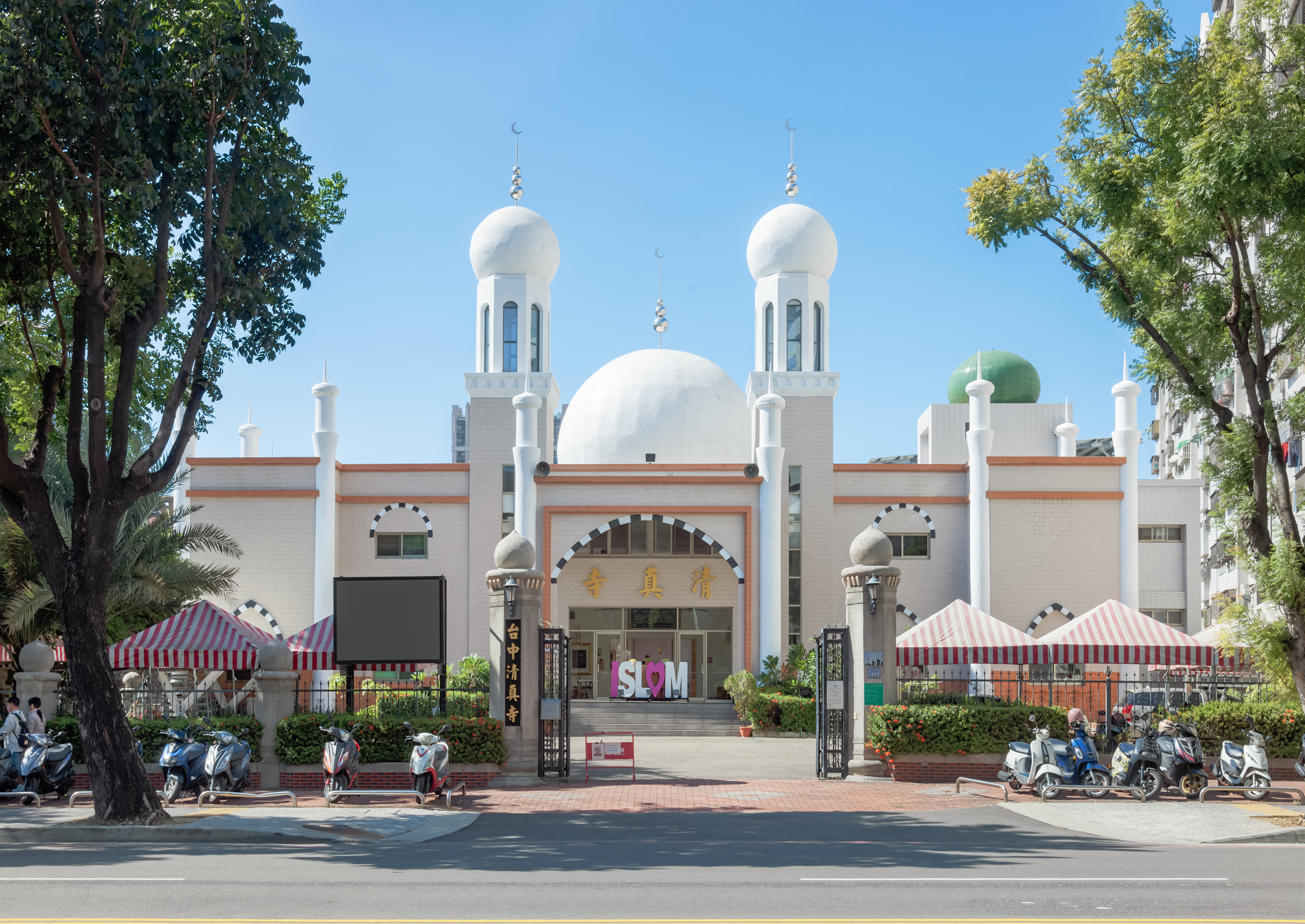
Taichung Mosque in Nantun District, Taichung

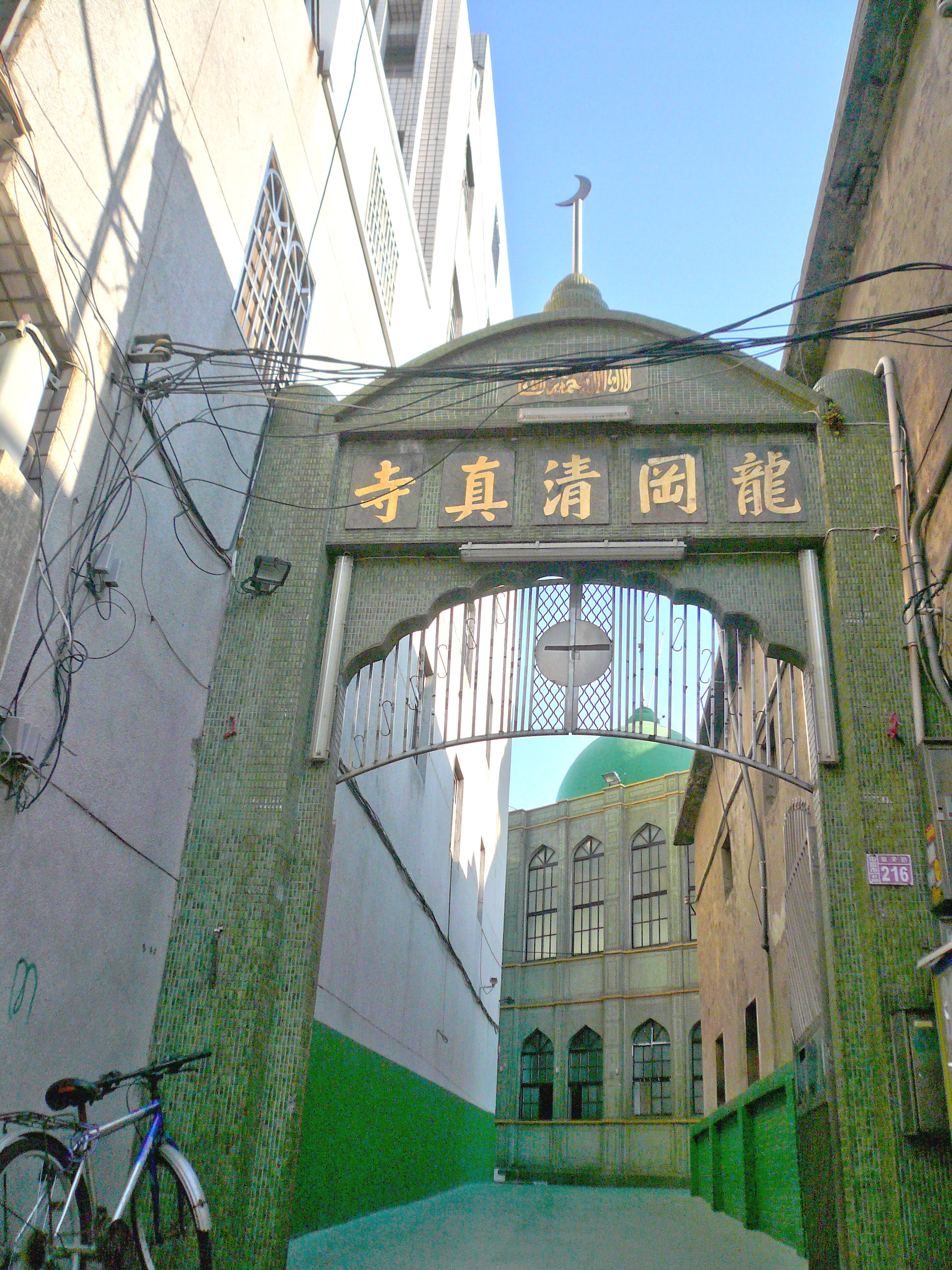
Longgang Mosque in Zhongli District, Taoyuan City

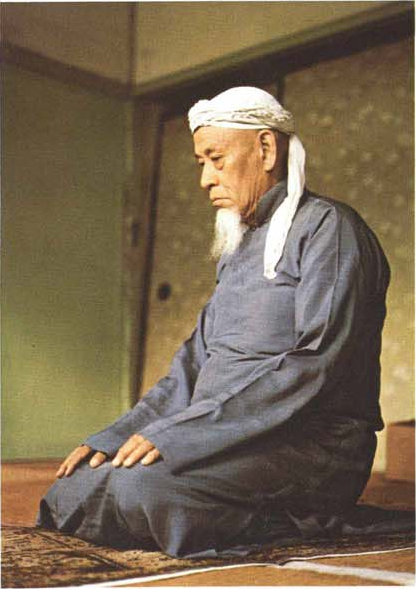
Elderly Taiwanese Muslim Hu Shiao-in, 78, observes prayer at Taichung Mosque, c. 1970

The second wave of Muslim migrants occurred during the Chinese Civil War in the 20th century when around 20,000 Muslim families fled mainland China with the Nationalist Government to Taiwan in 1949 at the end of Chinese Civil War under General Bai Chongxi. Many of them were soldiers and government employees at the time and came from provinces were Islam is strong such as Yunnan, Xinjiang, Ningxia, Anhui and Gansu (mostly southern and western regions of China). First mainland Chinese Muslim settlers in Taiwan founded Taiwan's first mosque in 1947, the Taipei Grand Mosque in Taipei. The mosque symbolized the friendly gesture from the ROC Government to Islam and also reinforced ROC diplomatic ties with their Muslim allies. After the establishment of the mosque, diplomatic activities between Republic of China and other Muslim countries developed considerably and trade and commerce increased remarkably.

This second wave of Muslim migration from mainland China to Taiwan resulted in the creation of other mosques in Taiwan, such as the Kaohsiung Mosque in 1949 in Kaohsiung, Taipei Cultural Mosque in 1950 in Taipei and Taichung Mosque in 1951 in Taichung.

During the 1950s, contact between Muslims and Han Chinese were limited due to differences in custom. The Muslims were largely dependent on each other through the ummah (Islamic community) that met regularly in a house on Lishui Street (traditional Chinese: 麗水街; simplified Chinese: 丽水街; pinyin: Lìshuǐ Jiē) in Da'an District, Taipei, the original site of the Taipei Grand Mosque before it was relocated and rebuilt at its current site at Xing Sheng South Road (Chinese: 新生南路; pinyin: Xīnshēng Nánlù) in 1960. However, by the 1960s when Muslims realized that returning to mainland China would be unlikely and out of professional need, contact with Han Chinese became more frequent though there was still a considerable degree of interdependence within the ummah.

In 1953, the United Nations General Assembly passed a resolution condemning the ROC government for its actions and guerrilla warfare inside Burma. Finally, an agreement was reached between Taipei, Yangon and Bangkok for evacuation of all Kuomintang irregular forces under command of General Li Mi to Taiwan. Civil Air Transport transported 5,583 Kuomintang soldiers and 1,040 dependents to Taiwan. The majority of these guerrilla forces were Muslim and had no place to worship in their new Taiwan home and so they started to construct the Longgang Mosque in Zhongli in 1964 and was completed three years later in 1967. There are around 200 Muslim families living around this area with most of them belongs to Ma family clans. There are numerous Halal Yunnan, Burmese and Thai restaurants around the area as well.

Around those periods, a few Muslim leaders held seats in the Legislative Yuan and National Assembly. There were Muslims serving as ranking officers of the armed forces, notably Lieutenant General Ma Ching-chiang which once became one of the top advisers of President Chiang Kai-shek. Muslims also held important posts in the diplomatic service, such as the ROC Ambassador to Kuwait Wang Shi-ming.

=== Third wave of migration ===
Since the 1980s, thousands of Muslims from Myanmar and Thailand have migrated to Taiwan in search of a better life. They are descendants of nationalist soldiers that fled Yunnan when the communists took over mainland China. These people constituted to the third Muslim immigration in Taiwan. Many of them settle in Huaxin Street at Zhonghe District of New Taipei, Zhongli District of Taoyuan City and some other towns.

=== Fourth wave of migration ===
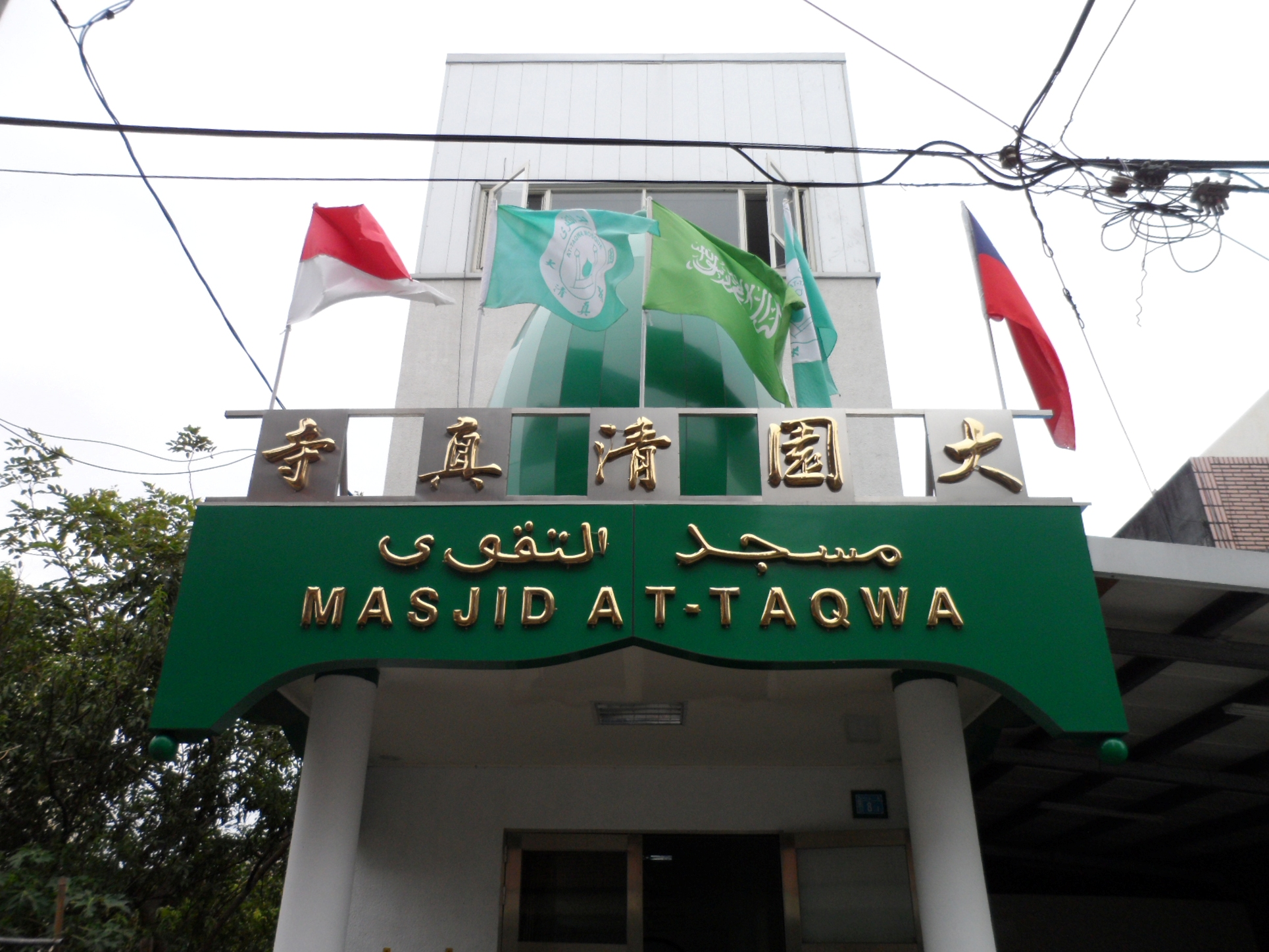
At-Taqwa Mosque in Dayuan District, Taoyuan City

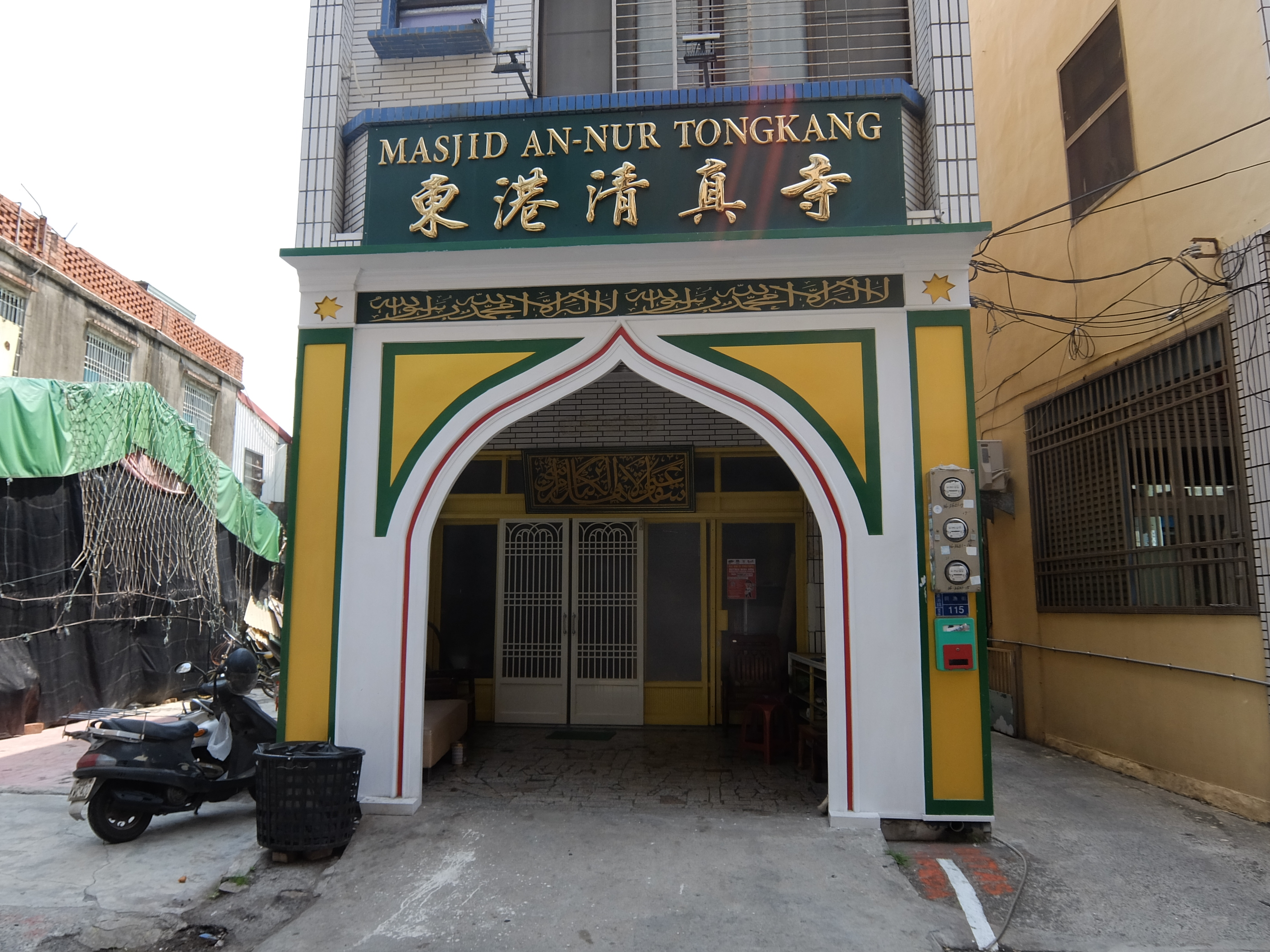
An-Nur Tongkang Mosque in Donggang Township, Pingtung County

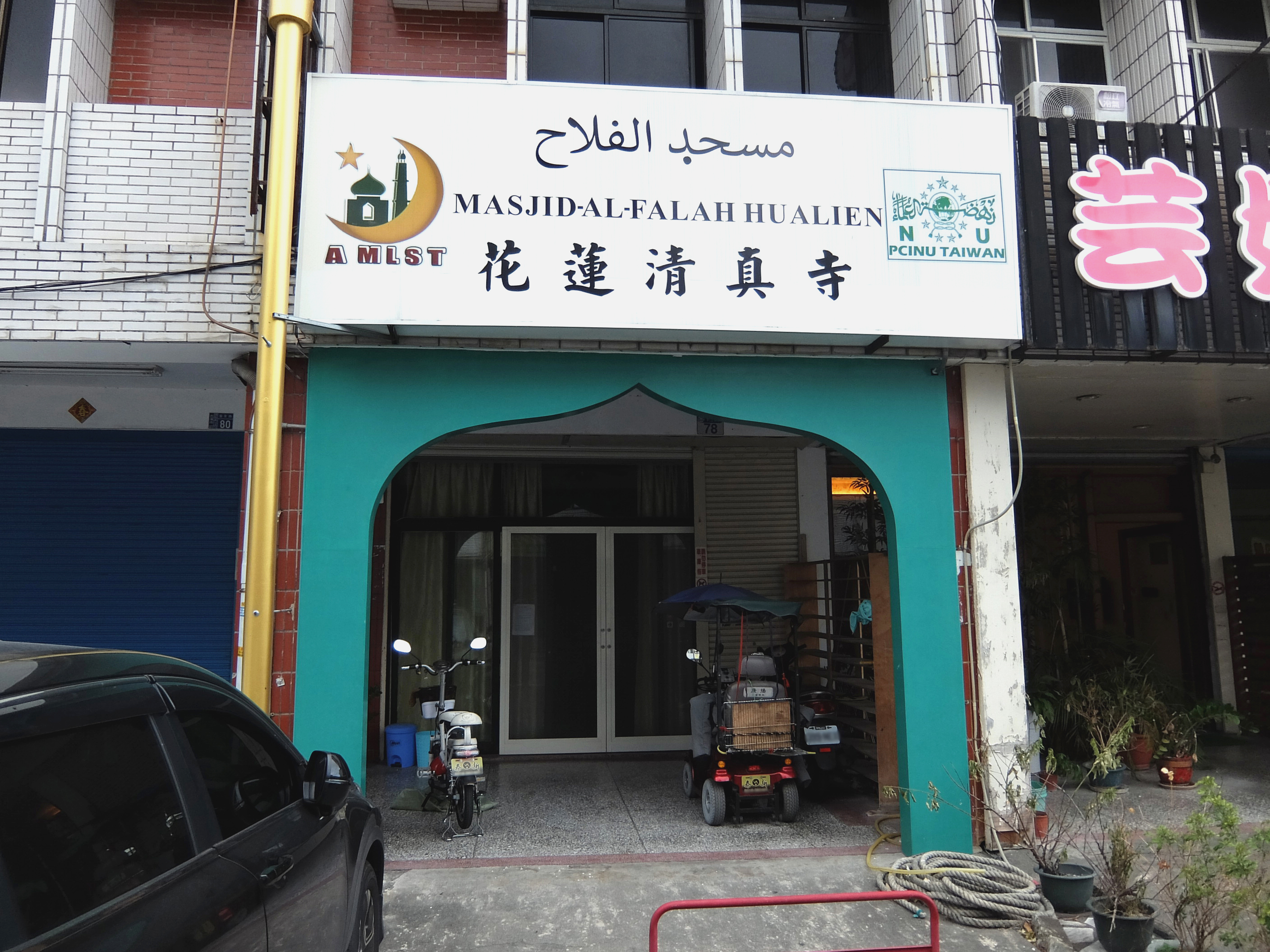
Hualien Al-Falah Mosque in Hualien City, Hualien County

In 1989, Taiwan implemented a policy of allowing more migrant workers to take blue-collar jobs in the growing industrial sectors, many of whom came from Muslim-majority countries in South and Southeast Asia. The majority of Taiwanese Muslims today are relatively recent converts, mostly women, who have married mainlander Muslims. Today there are some 60,000 Taiwanese Muslims and a further 250,000 Indonesian Muslim workers and other Muslims from Malaysia, the Philippines, Pakistan, India and elsewhere, making the current total of over 310,000 Muslims living in Taiwan.

The growing Muslim population in Taiwan from Indonesia can be seen in many industrial towns, such as the one in Dayuan District, Taoyuan City where there are a growing number of Indonesian workers there, in which most of them are Muslim. An Indonesian worker married to a local Taiwanese man built the At-Taqwa Mosque, Taiwan's seventh mosque, which was opened on 9 June 2013. A group of Indonesian fishermen working at a nearby port established Taiwan's eight mosque, the Baitul Muslimin Mosque in Su'ao Township, Yilan County in 2014 and Taiwan's ninth mosque, the An-Nur Tongkang Mosque in Donggang Township, Pingtung County which was completed in 2017 and opened on 18 February 2018. Taiwan's tenth and latest mosque, the Hualien Al-Falah Mosque, was built in Hualien City, Hualien County and inaugurated by former Indonesian Minister of Law and Human Rights Mahfud MD on 18 March 2018.

==== COVID-19 pandemic ====
Religious activities in all worship sites in Taiwan were suspended from May 15 until June 8, 2021, due to surging cases of COVID-19.

== Contemporary Islam ==
=== Government remarks ===
In April 2005, President Chen Shui-bian led a delegation from Taiwan to attend the funeral of Pope John Paul II in St. Peter's Basilica, Vatican City by a chartered China Airlines flight. The delegation includes the Minister of Foreign Affairs Mark Chen and Taipei Grand Mosque imam Ma Shiao-chi.

Speaking at the opening ceremony of the 16th General Assembly of the Regional Islamic Dawah Council of Southeast Asia and the Pacific (RISEAP) which was held in December 2015 in Taipei, President Ma Ying-jeou said that the government is committed to promoting religious freedom, enhancing the understanding of Islam and to safeguards the minority Muslims in Taiwan to keep in line with the ROC constitutions.

=== Media and communication ===
The native language of Taiwanese Muslim is Mandarin, therefore Quran and Hadith have been translated from its original Arabic to Mandarin by Ma Jun and Chen Ke-li respectively. In March 1959, the first Quran translation in Chinese language which consists of 400,000 words was published in bookstores. It was the result of translation works made by a special translation board over seven years of work.

The CMA used to sponsor a weekly radio program at the Broadcasting Corporation of China through big transmitters beamed to mainland China to keep the Muslims in the mainland informed about religious activities in Taiwan and Muslim countries around the globe. They also used native Arabic speakers for the broadcasting programs broadcast to other Muslim countries.

The Islam in China is a quarterly Islamic magazine circulated in Taiwan with the aim of strengthening the contact between Taiwanese Muslims and the development of Islam in Taiwan. Around 2,000 copies of each issue are circulated throughout Taiwan and abroad. The magazine focuses on the Quran, Hadith, Dawah and news concerning Islam and Muslims in Taiwan. The other is Islamic Culture by the Chinese Muslim Youth League. There are other several Islamic publications in Taiwan which includes Islamic teachings.

On 29 September 2020, Chunghwa Post released stamps featuring Taipei Grand Mosque and Taichung Mosque with denomination of NT$15 and NT$28 respectively.

=== Muslim employment regulations ===
In Taiwan, employers can also be fined if they force Muslim workers to come into contact with pork. In May 2010, wife of the owner of Shin Hua Hang Fashion Co. in Taipei County was charged for forcing her three Muslim Indonesian employees to eat pork for seven months. She was sentenced to six months in prison for the act. The three workers wrote a letter to the labor department of the then-Taipei County Government asking for help. This incident triggered a protest from dozens of foreign workers at the Bureau of Consular Affairs in Taipei, led by Taiwan International Workers’ Association (TIWA). This incident led to a condemnation from the Government of Indonesia. Ku Yu-ling, chairperson of TIWA, said that the root of the problem lies in the government repeatedly delaying including migrant caregivers under the Labor Standards Act to protect their basic working rights. This incident led to the creation of a television advertisement by the Council of Labor Affairs showing respect for different religions and promotion of social harmony. The advertisement was welcomed by the Chinese Muslim Association.

In May 2011 in Chiayi City, a couple was fined for doing that to an Indonesian worker, in addition to other offences such as a long workday and threats of deportation. The Indonesian worker firstly came to Taiwan being misled into thinking that she would take employment as elderly care taker.

Currently, there are various Taiwanese Muslims working as civil servants, military personnel, engineers, doctors, lawyers and professors at higher learning institutes, trade and industry sectors. However, there are still no Muslim at the corporate ladders, and there is currently no representative at the Legislative Yuan.

During the 2017 Eid al-Fitr, the Ministry of Labor gave a statement encouraging employers to allow their Muslim workers to observe the festivity and to have a day off during that day. During 2018 Ramadan, the Department of Labor of Taipei City Government reminded employers who employ Muslim workers to accommodate their fasting and prayer rituals during the month.

=== Islamic food ===
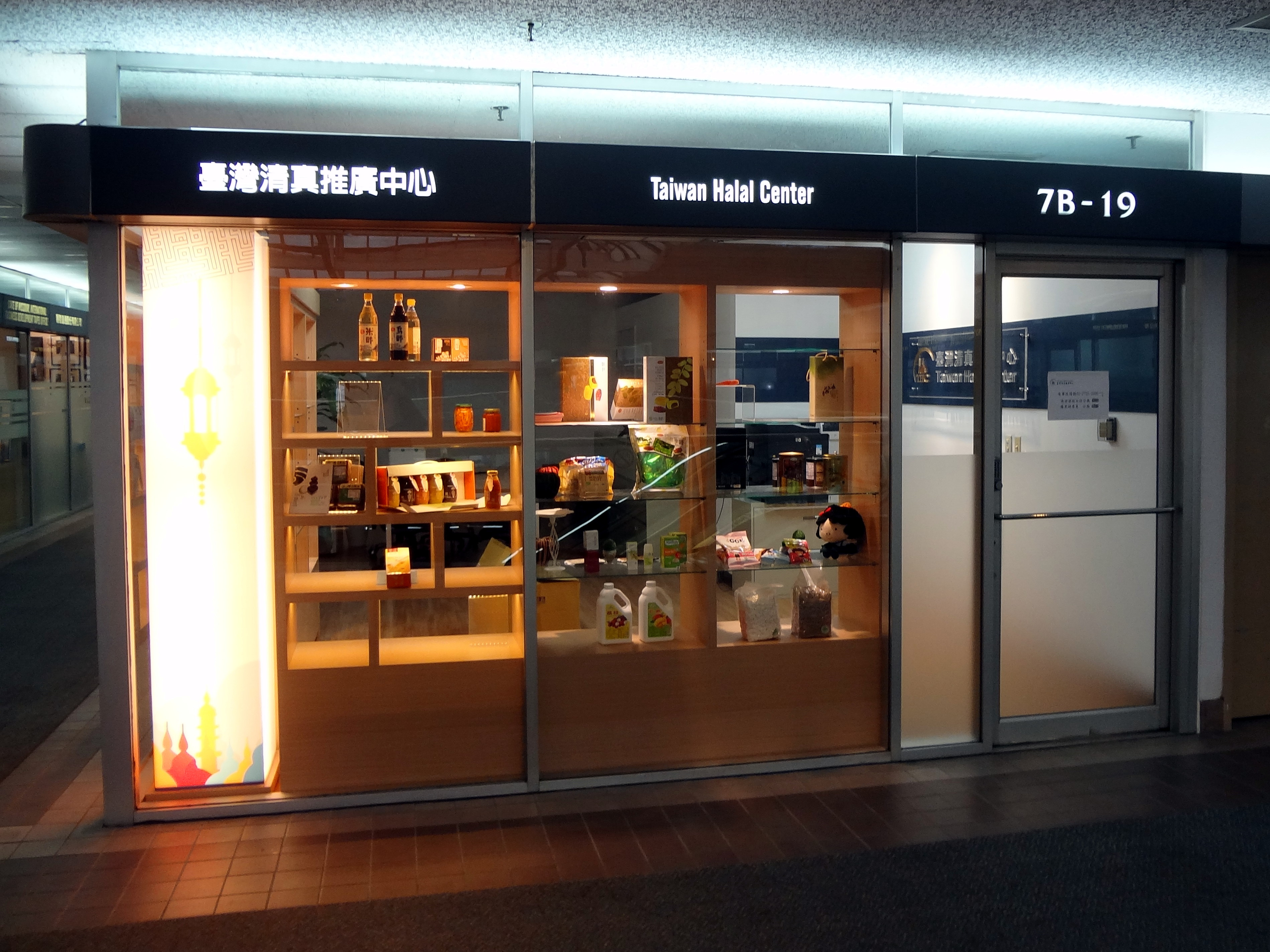
Taiwan Halal Center in Xinyi District, Taipei

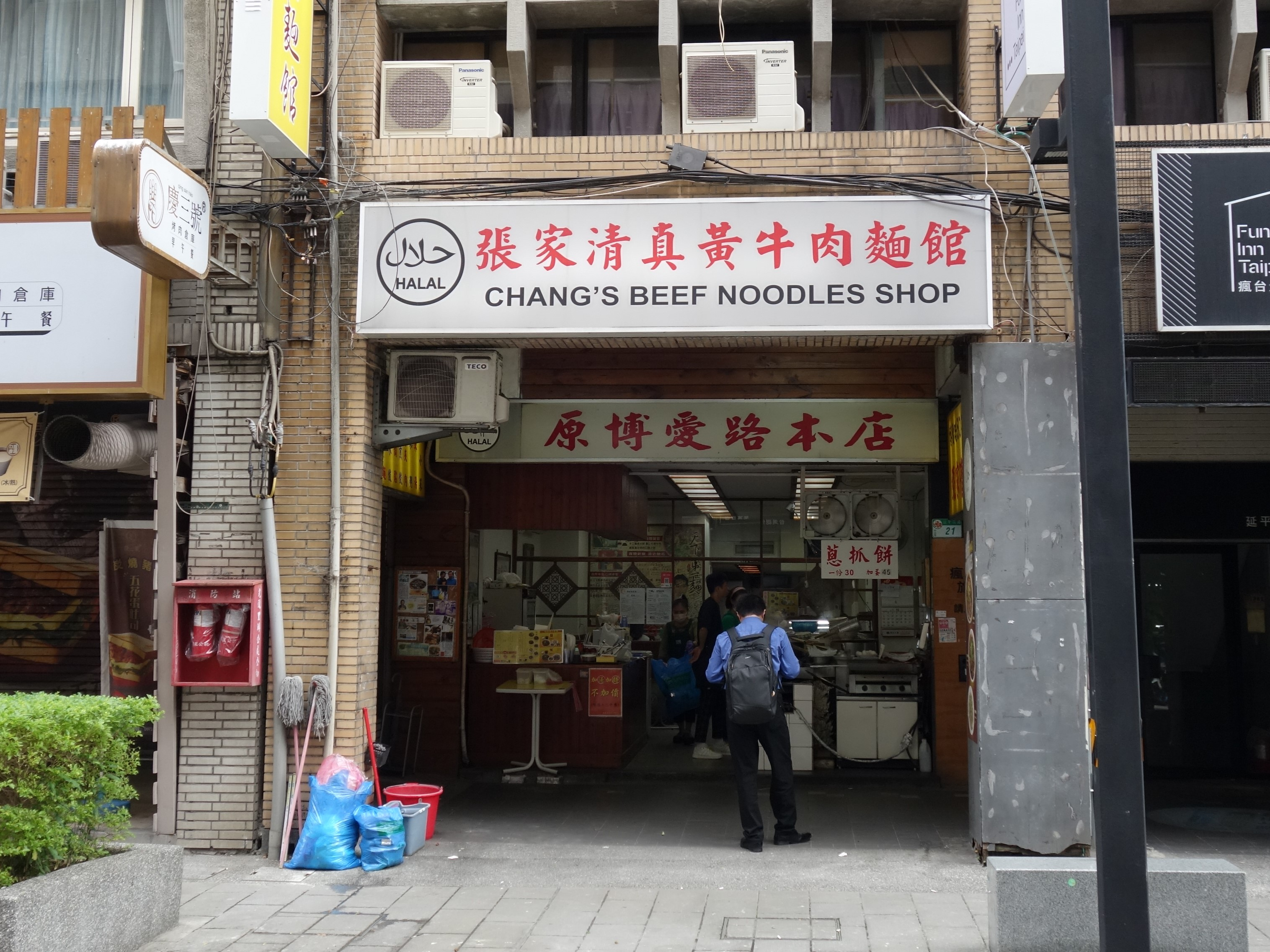
Halal Chinese restaurant in Zhongzheng District, Taipei

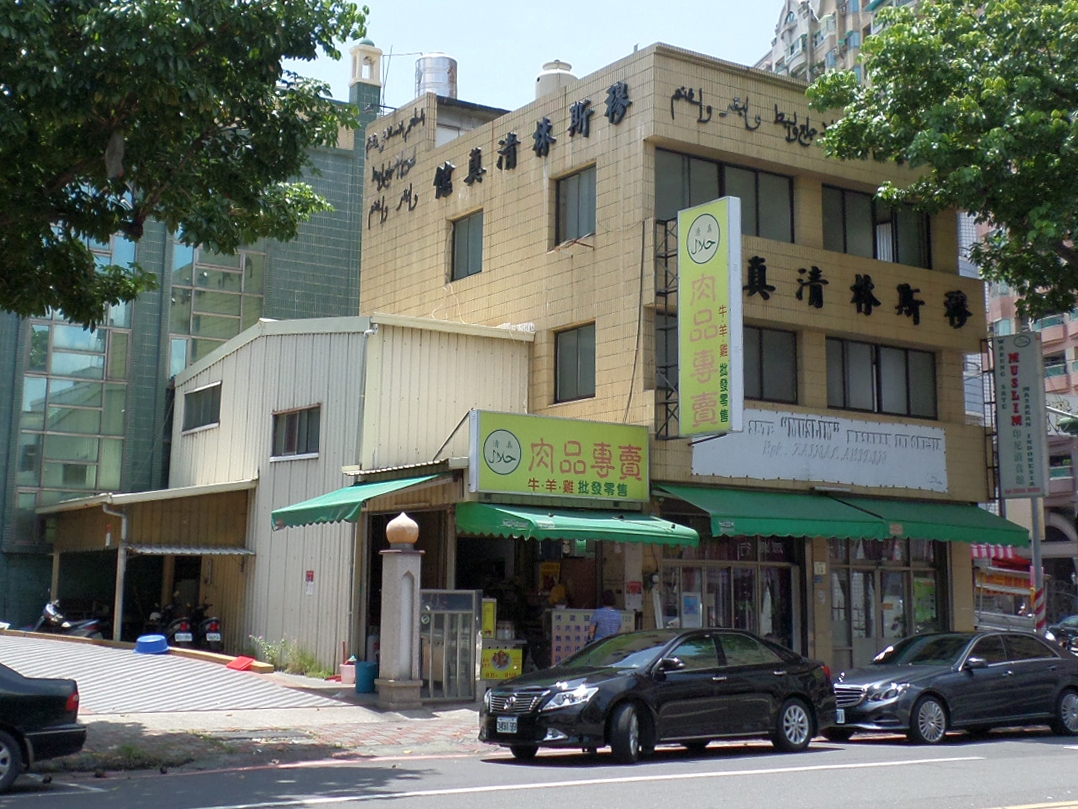
Halal restaurants in Lingya District, Kaohsiung

Halal restaurants are widely available around Taiwan, although most of them are highly concentrated in Taipei, with some other restaurants in Taoyuan City, Taichung and Kaohsiung. As of November 2019, there are around 200 Halal restaurants altogether in Taiwan. The number continues to grow at a rate around 20 percent annually. Taiwan Halal Center was launched on 21 April 2017 in Taipei with the purpose of promoting halal-certified products, which also includes overseas branches to help Taiwanese companies to obtain the certification to export the products to countries with halal product demands. The headquarters of the center is located on the seventh floor of Taipei World Trade Center hall 1.

One of Taiwan's halal certification body is the Taiwan Halal Integrity Development Association, inaugurated in May 2011 in Taipei, obtained the membership to a cross-border halal food certification program which is governed by the authorities from Indonesia, Malaysia and Singapore. The association is based in Taipei Cultural Mosque. Another type of Halal certification, the 'Muslim Friendly Restaurant' certification, is handled by the Chinese Muslim Association (CMA). The purpose of the certification, except to certify the Halal-ness of the food, is to let the world knows that there are Muslims in Taiwan too. The certification guidelines specify method, source, items, dos and donts in hosting Muslim customers according to their customs in dining in restaurants. The methods specified by the certification guidelines may make the cost of hosting Muslim travelers more costly, but it helps to attract more Muslim tourist visitors to Taiwan.

There are two halal type of certification for restaurants or food outlets in Taiwan, which are:

- 'Halal Restaurant' for restaurants or food outlets owned by Muslims
- 'Muslim Friendly Restaurant' for restaurants or food outlets owned by non-Muslims

Taiwan-based halal food makers are Zheng Yee Food, Sunnano Biotech, Baeyuea Enterprise, Tiger Brand Cheng Tung Industrial, Affinity Food, Flavor Full Foods, Excellence Food Biochemical, Taiwan Smile Food, Jiou Long Jai Foodstuff, Ruhn Chan International and Tsan Yu Yen Foods.

Some universities, such as National Taiwan University of Science and Technology and Yuanpei University of Medical Technology have set up cafeterias in their campuses serving halal foods for their students.

In July 2011, the Shangri-La Leisure Farm resort in Yilan County received the Halal certification from CMA, becoming the first lodging place in Taiwan to receive such certification after three years of efforts with the help from the Tourism Bureau of the Ministry of Transportation and Communications. Besides the certification, the resort also provides prayer spaces for Muslims and providing arrow pointing to Qibla on their rooms ceiling.

Taiwan held its first Halal expo in 2013 at Taipei Nangang Exhibition Center called the 2013 Taiwan International Halal Expo. The halal goods offer innovative products that offer a special blend between halal foods with Taiwan characteristics. The expo was initiated by the Taiwan External Trade Development Council (TAITRA) by dedicating the previously Halal Section of Food Taipei Expo to become its very own expo.

In March 2013, 16 restaurants around Taiwan were given halal certification, in a move to make Taiwan more attractive to Muslim tourists thereby expanding tourism in Taiwan. The certificates were issued by the Tourism Bureau in collaboration with CMA. The restaurants covered are in Taipei, New Taipei, Taoyuan City, Taichung, Tainan, Hualien and Taitung. These restaurants cover a wide variety of food, including Chinese, Taiwanese, Indian, Thai, Turkish and Egyptian cuisine. This move brings the total number of halal restaurants throughout Taiwan to 31. Liu Hsi-lin, deputy director-general of the bureau, said during the ceremony that people from different countries and different religions will have different needs. The key to develop Taiwan's tourism industry is to show respect for these diverse needs. He said that Taiwan is aiming at attracting Muslim tourists from Indonesia, Malaysia and Singapore. Thus the bureau, together with the CMA, try to help the local tourist industries cater to the needs of Muslim visitors. Also present at the ceremony is Salahuding Ma, secretary-general of CMA.

According to TAITRA, in June 2013 there were almost 150 Taiwanese companies who have obtained Halal certification with another 130 are still in the certification process, thus creating small local Muslim industries.

There are currently four slaughterhouses in Taiwan that provide halal meat, which are one in Taipei and three in Yunlin.

In June 2018, the Taipei City Government announced the introduction of vending machines that sell Halal-certified foods. The initial installation of the machines shall take place nearby universities and colleges with high number of Muslim students. Several FamilyMart stores in Taipei have included various halal products on their shelves.

The Liouhe Night Market in Sinsing District, Kaohsiung has begun selling halal foods at its stalls. In 2019, the government provided subsidies to a number of stalls of the night market to encourage them to apply for halal certifications from the International Muslim Tourism Industry Development Association.

The certification under the name of Taipei Grand Mosque Restaurant is a food certification issued by the Taipei Grand Mosque Foundation.

=== Education ===
Due to the absence of any formal Islamic education in Taiwan as well as with other religions, the mosques hold some Islamic courses to the local Muslims such as Arabic language, Quran and Hadith teaching and Sharia by request from the parents. Many of the courses are being run on weekends due to the busy work and study schedule of Taiwanese people during the weekdays.

However, for the teaching of Arabic language, the course has been available at the National Chengchi University in Taipei since 1957 under the Department of Arabic Language and Culture under the College of Foreign Language and Literature. Due to the growing importance of Arab nations in the aspect of cultures, politics and economics of the world, the government authorized the Department of Arabic Language and Culture to be independent, making it equal to the Department of Oriental Languages and Cultures within the university. The department also has partner universities with the Kuwait University, University of Jordan and King Saud University. The department, in collaboration with the Center for the Study of Islamic Civilization and Thoughts, held an international conference entitled The Middle East and Islam on 15 May 2009 at the university with the theme Middle East and Islam in the 21st Century: Past, Present and Future.

The Chinese Muslim Association has also been sending Taiwanese Muslim students overseas to receive formal Islamic education. To further improve the effort in preserving the Islamic faith among the Muslims, the association has developed a plan to "educating secular educators" and that the Bureau of Education of the Taipei City Government has approve the proposal to hold Islamic courses for primary and secondary school teachers during summer vacations. They also provide authentic Islamic information to public school teachers to eliminate the Islamic stereotyping and misunderstanding.

=== Fasting ===
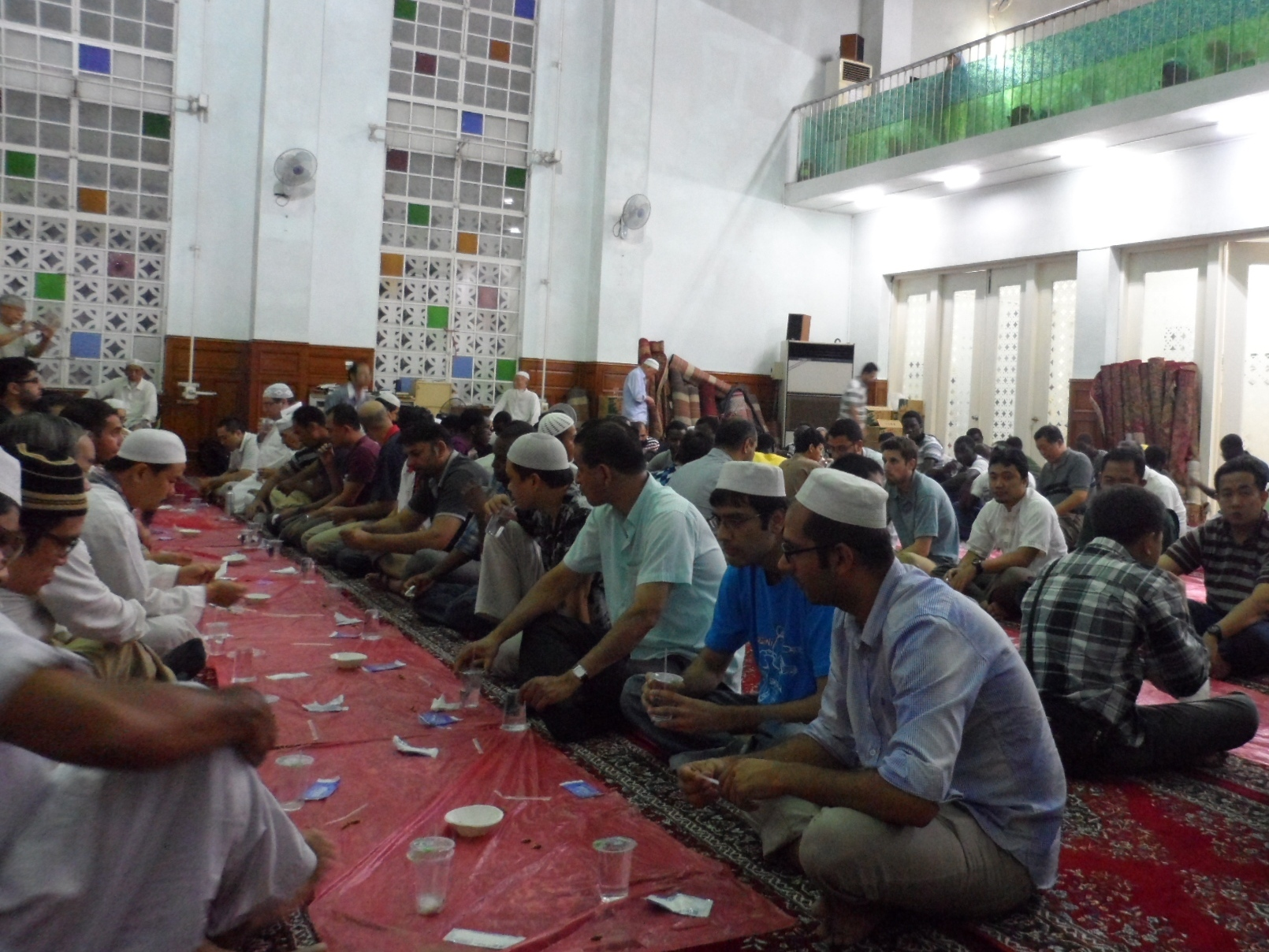
Fast break at Taipei Grand Mosque during the fasting month

Muslims in Taiwan observe the fasting during the Islamic month of Ramadan. In general, they face no problem regarding practicing the rituals in Taiwan. The only problem faced by them is to always have to reject politely any lunch invitation from their Taiwanese colleagues during the day. Local Taiwanese might wonder as well when some of their Muslim neighbors wake up really early in the morning to cook their suhur, meal eaten before they start their fast.

Yunus A. Ma, imam of the Taipei Grand Mosque in September 2008, said that Ramadan is the opportunity for Taiwanese Muslims to think over their faith and deeds. The Chinese Muslim Association regularly distributes the schedule for fast, prayer and fast break during the fasting months. During the fasting month in 2016, the Taipei Grand Mosque made a request to employers or companies hiring Muslim workers to be more flexible and easy towards them so that they will be able to fully observe the fasting. Same remark was also conveyed by the Department of Labor of Taipei City Government for the fasting month in 2018 and by the Ministry of Labor in 2020.

=== Zakat ===
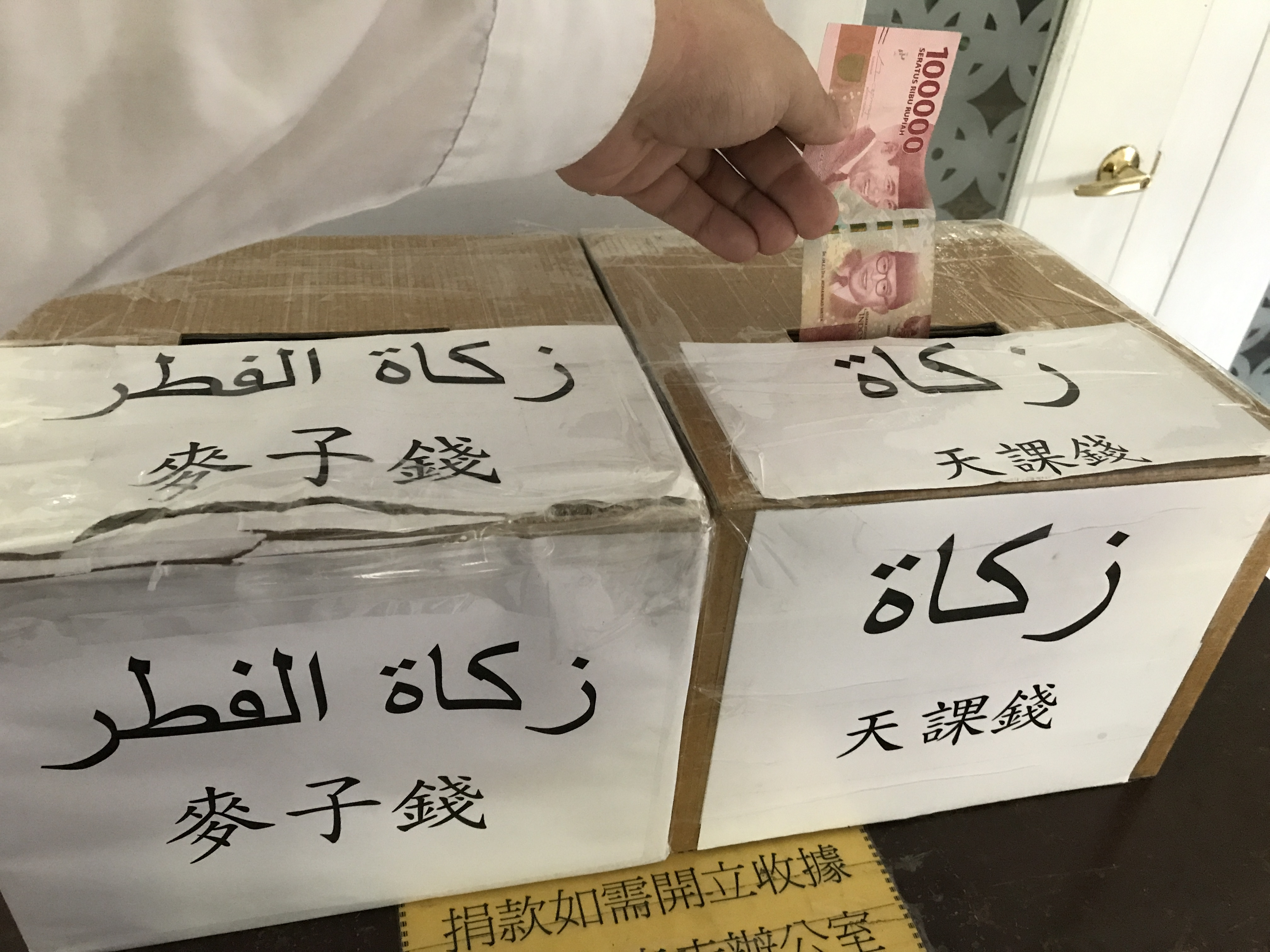
Zakat donation box at Taipei Grand Mosque

Zakat is a compulsory charity in Islam but it does not always have to be in terms of financial means. Taiwanese Muslims from the Taipei Grand Mosque often visit foreign workers under detention in Sanxia, Yunlin and other detention centers for usually overstaying their employment visa. The Muslims help them with their paperwork and other needs. Other Taiwanese Muslims visit the elderly, ill and poor in the community.

=== Healthcare ===
In November 2018, Taiwan Adventist Hospital in Songshan District, Taipei was the first hospital in Taiwan to be certified Muslim-friendly. The certification was made by the Indonesian Ulema Council after their food, drugs and cosmetic products provided were certified Halal, as well as having a Muslim prayer room. Currently the Taipei City Government is also working with the hospital to expand the number of Muslim-friendly hospitals in the city. Various hospitals around the island have also established prayer rooms and halal dining options for the visitors.

=== Weddings ===
Most of the Taiwanese Muslim weddings are being held in Taipei Grand Mosque due to its large size, and also that 40 percent of Taiwanese Muslims, mostly as their relatives and friends, reside in Taipei. Generally Muslims in Taiwan keep the tradition of maintaining partner from the same faith or having to convert to Islam due to marriage.

=== Muslim festivities ===
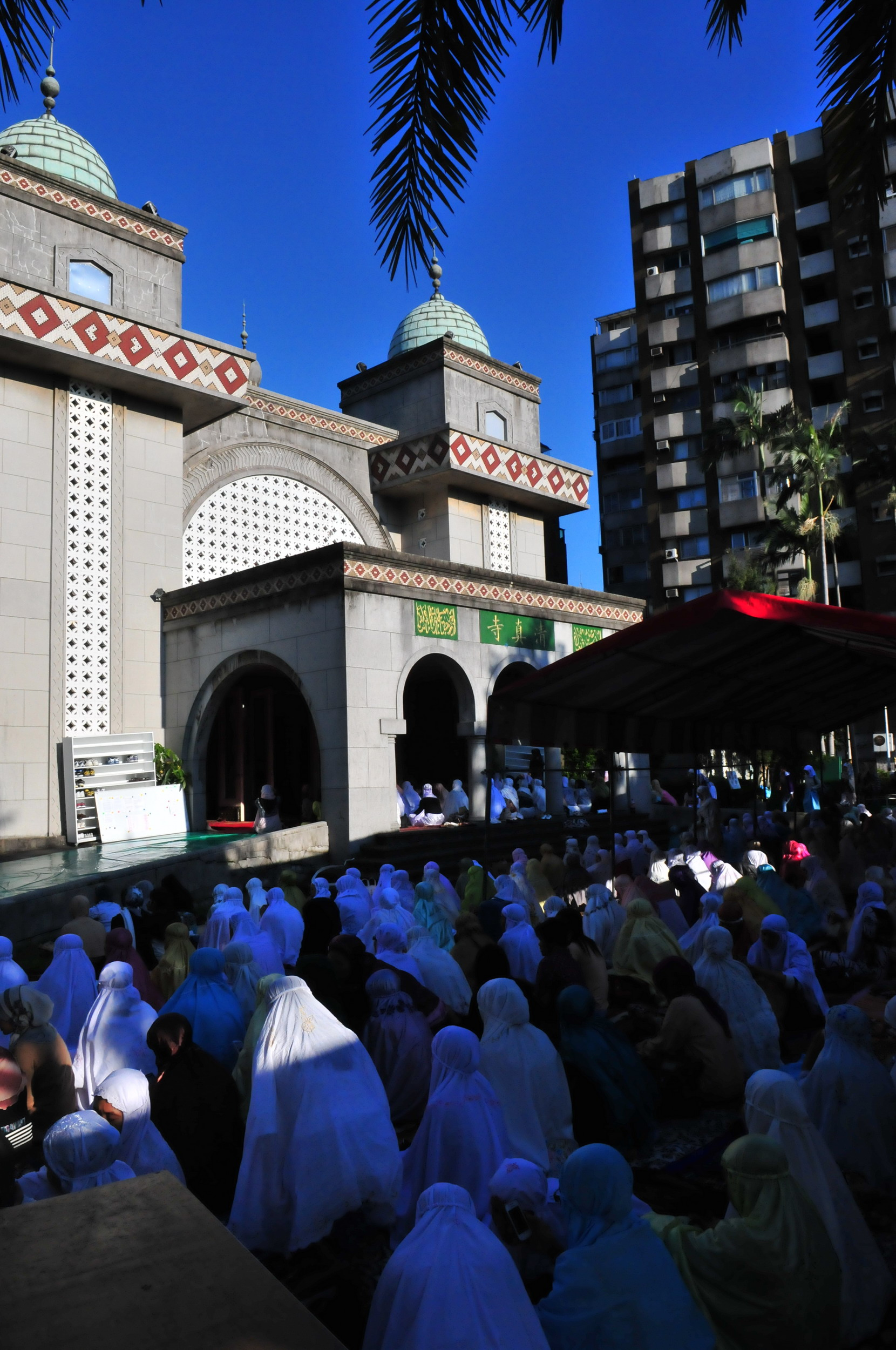
Eid al-Fitr prayer at Taipei Grand Mosque

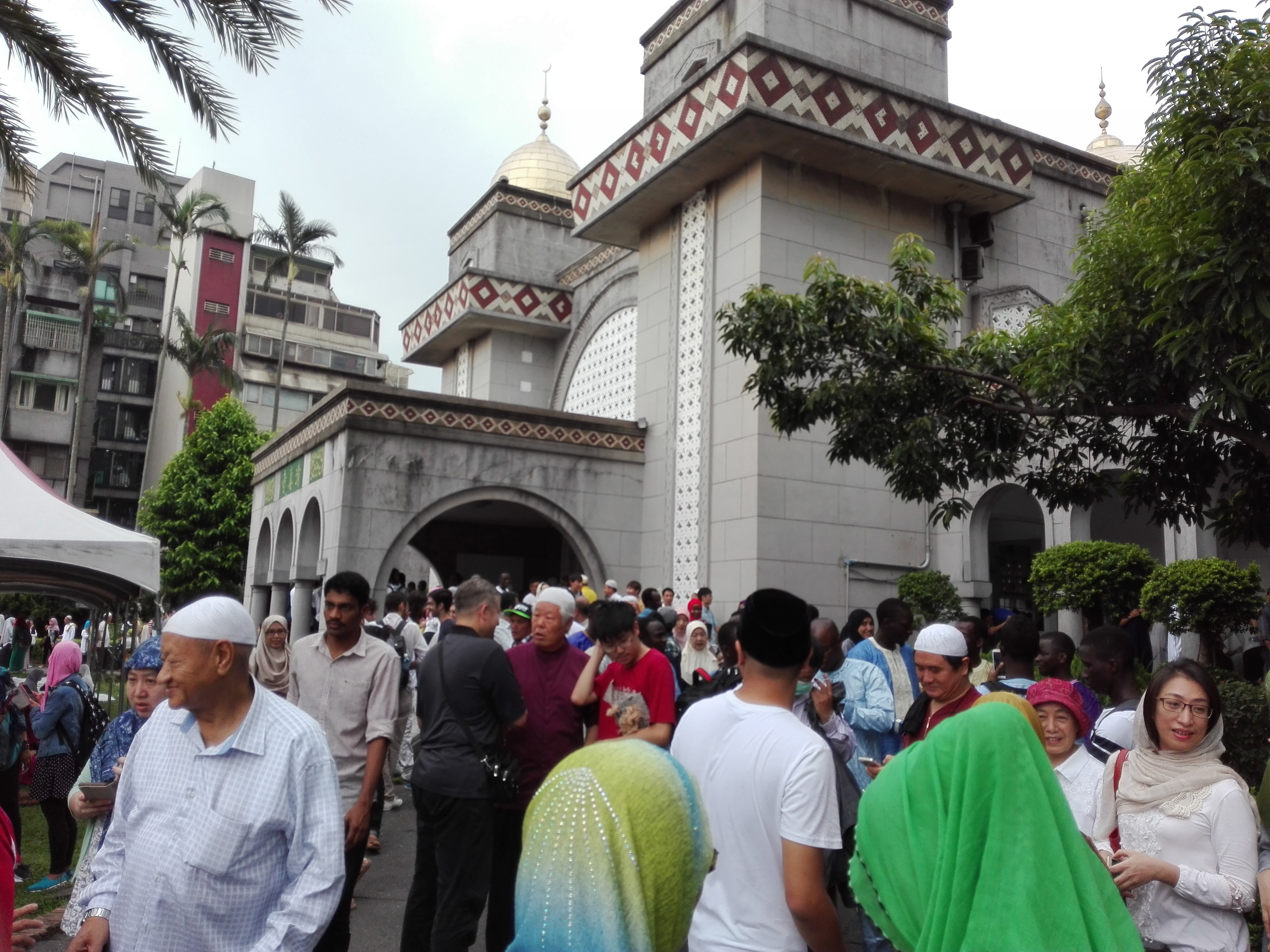
Eid al-Adha at Taipei Grand Mosque

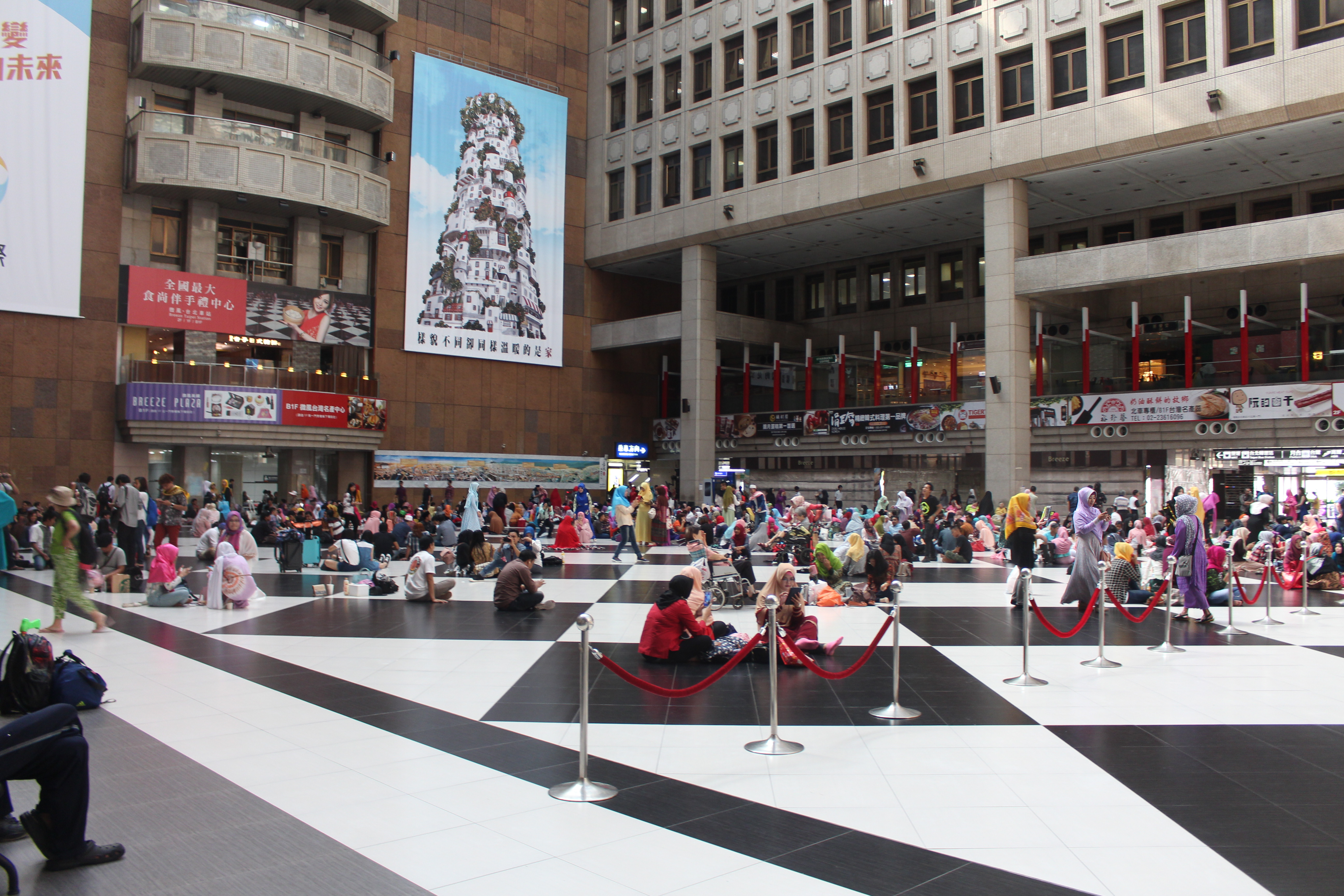
Eid al-Fitr gathering at Taipei Main Station

The Eid al-Fitr prayer and celebration in Taiwan draws much attention from local media. Special features of the event are regularly carried out in the newspapers and aired on televisions. These phenomena gives a boost to the Islamic activities in Taiwan.

Speaking at Taipei Grand Mosque in December 2001 during Eid al-Fitr, Taipei Mayor Ma Ying-jeou thanked the Indonesian workers for their contribution to Taiwan and gave them festive greeting. The mayor was spotted wearing Jinnah cap while greeting the workers and spoke a bit of Indonesian language. He cited that 20,000 among 36,000 foreign workers in Taipei were Indonesians, which had contributed much to the construction and household assistance of Taipei City. He also said that if all of those workers took the same day off, one-quarter of the city would be paralyzed.

In August 2013, during the Muslims's grand festival Eid al-Fitr after the end of fasting month, the Taipei City Government opened two major venues in Taipei for people to gather and celebrate the festival, in which the majority of them are Indonesian blue-collar workers. Those two venues are at a square northwest of Taipei Main Station and the other is at Daan Forest Park. The reason to choose the park because the park is located just across the Taipei Grand Mosque. Taipei Mayor Hau Lung-pin made a remark urging Taiwanese to be more considerate to foreign workers, telling them that those workers have helped to make Taipei a better city to live, thus Taiwanese should treat them like families.

On 3 December 2014, the Foreign and Disabled Labor Office of the Taipei City Government held Eid al-Fitr celebrations at Chiang Kai-shek Memorial Hall and 228 Peace Memorial Park. The office called for Taiwanese to respect different religions and religious practices, allowing Muslims to celebrate the conclusion of Ramadan fasting month.

In June 2017, President Tsai Ing-wen conveyed her Eid al-Fitr greeting to the Muslims in Taiwan. At the same time, Taipei Mayor Ko Wen-je visited Taipei Main Station to meet with many Muslim migrant workers who were celebrating the festive. The mayor thanked them and promised to increase the number of Halal restaurants in Taipei.

In June 2019, Eid al-Fitr was celebrated island-wide around Taiwan, including in Penghu. National Cheng Kung University set up a temporary space at its old library to accommodate people for the Eid prayer.

In 2020, Eid al-Fitr celebration was cancelled for the very first time at the Taipei Grand Mosque and its surroundings due to the ongoing COVID-19 pandemic in Taiwan. Nevertheless, President Tsai Ing-wen conveyed her greeting to the Muslim communities wishing them safety in enjoying and celebrating the festival, and also wishing the COVID-19 pandemic will subside soon from around the world, including in Muslim countries. For the 2020 Eid al-Adha festive on 31 July, people performed the Eid prayer at the plaza outside Taipei Main Station. The prayer was divided into three session to minimize the number of worshippers at one particular time. In 2021, Eid al-Fitr celebration which was scheduled to be celebrated at Taipei Main Station was also cancelled for the second time due to the ongoing pandemic despite having a green light initially.

In 2023, Eid al-Fitr celebration was started back again after the relaxation of COVID-19 restriction. Celebration was held in Daan Forest Park and was attended by Taipei Mayor Chiang Wan-an. The mayor pledged to strengthen Taipei's inclusiveness and sustainability.

In April 2024, the Chung Hwa University of Medical Technology organized Eid Al-Fitr celebration which was attended by Tainan Mayor Huang Wei-che. The event was jointly organized with Southern Taiwan University of Science and Technology and Kun Shan University.

=== Innovations ===
Various Islam-related mobile applications have been developed in Taiwan or by Taiwanese, such as apps for prayer times.

=== Hajj pilgrimage ===
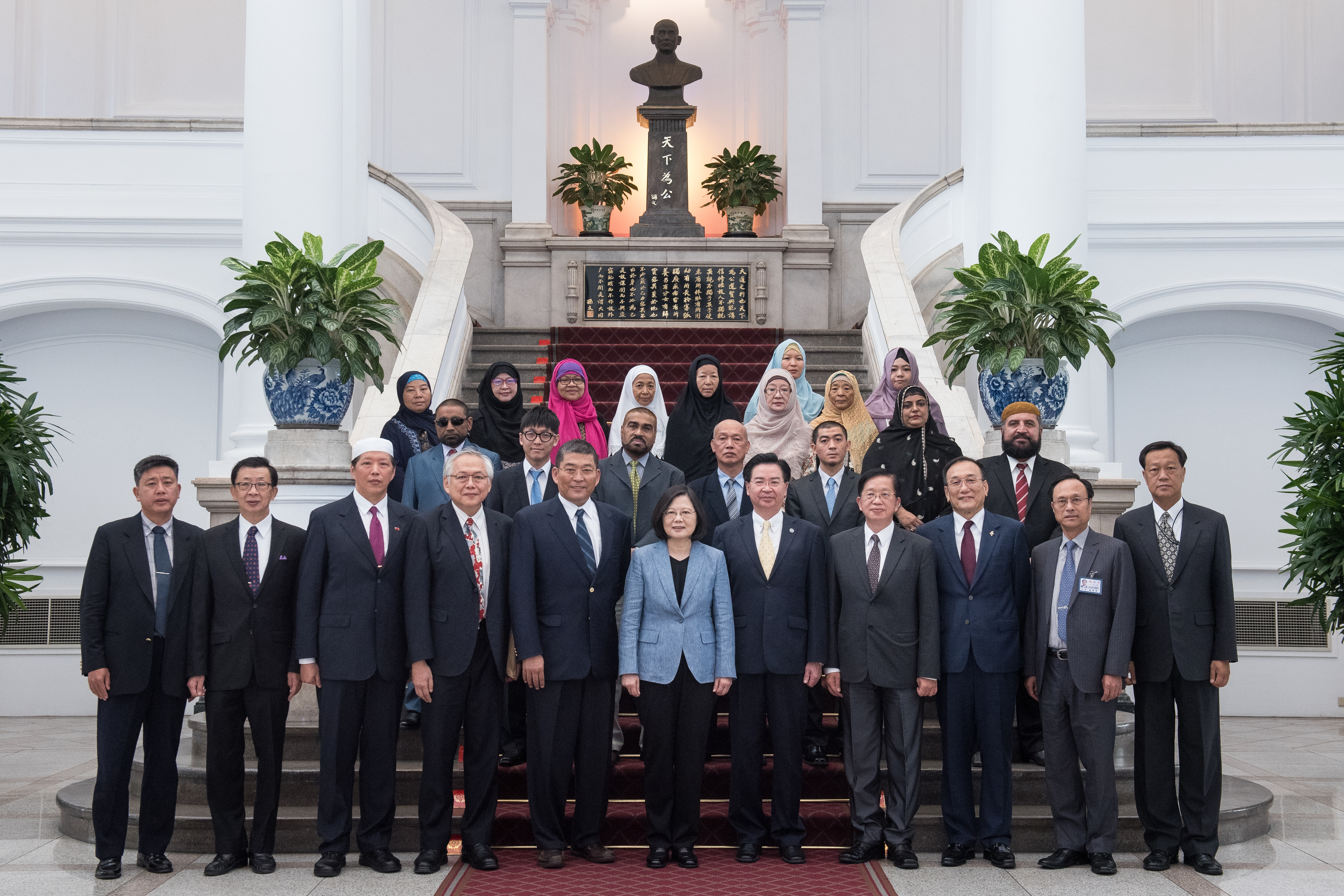
President Tsai Ing-wen with the people who have just returned from Hajj pilgrimage in 2017

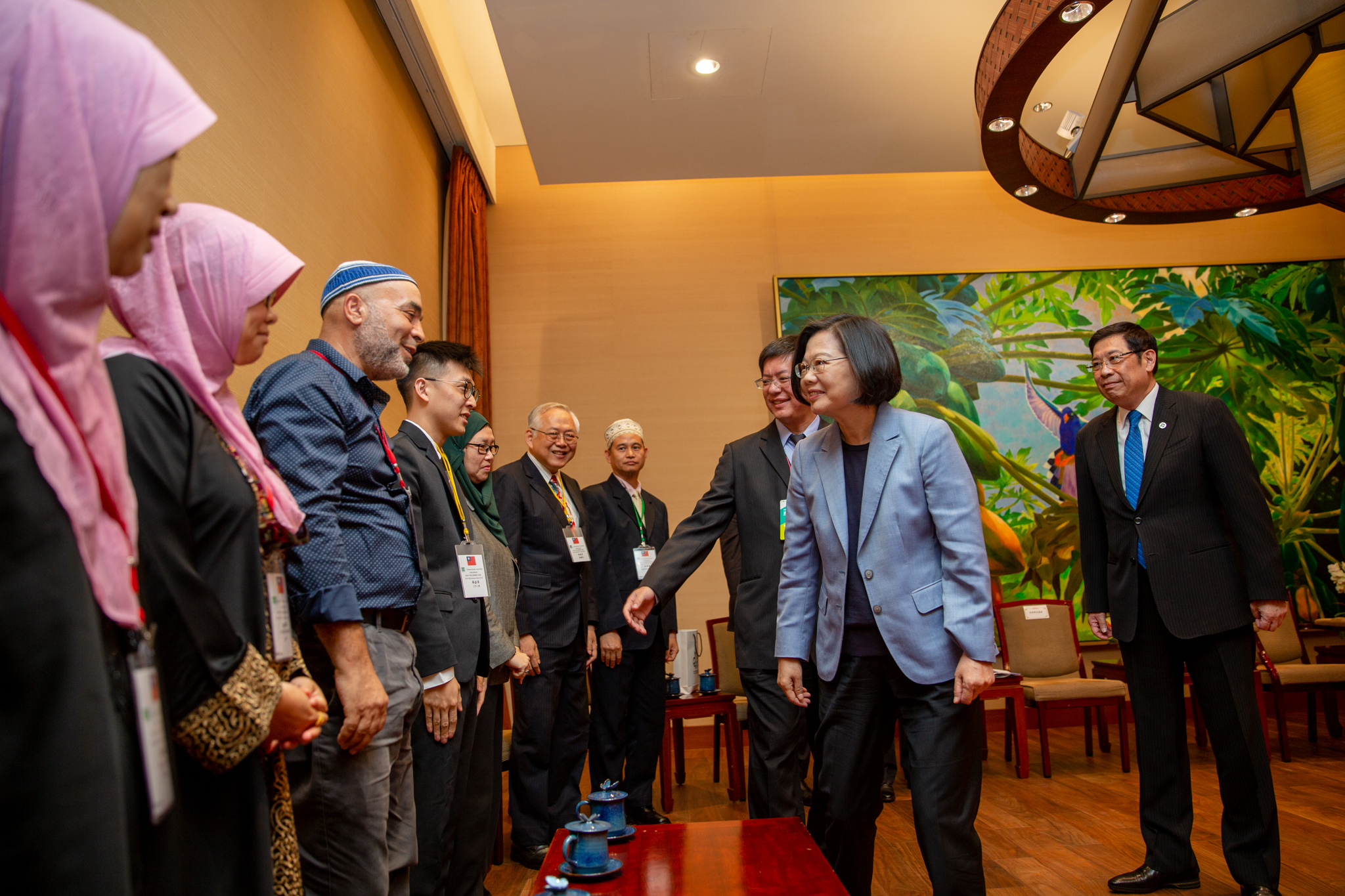
President Tsai Ing-wen and 2019 Taiwan Hajj delegations

The Republic of China sent their first Hajj delegation to perform the ritual in 1925. After the end of Chinese Civil War in 1949, the ROC continued back sending hajj delegates in 1954. In the early years, Hajj delegation from Taiwan was led by Ma Bufang. Nowadays, around 40–50 percent of Taiwanese Muslims will make their Hajj pilgrimage to Saudi Arabia at some stage of their life, although not every Muslim there has the ability to perform such duty.

During the 2000 Hajj pilgrimage, Taiwan sent a total of 22 Muslims on 21 February 2000 to begin their pilgrim. However, another 32 people departed on 10 March 2000 at the invitation of King Fahd bin Abdulaziz Al Saud.

During the 2005 Hajj pilgrimage, Taiwan sent 27 members of the delegation to perform the ritual consisting of 13 men and 14 women. The delegation was led by Dawood Ma, director of Chinese Muslim Association (CMA). He said that priority for the delegation was given to those who was going to make the journey for the first time. The selection process was done seven months before the pilgrim season. All of the selected pilgrims were given orientation in the rituals, laws of Saudi Arabia, Arabic lifestyle and Arabic language. He acknowledged the 26-day of the ritual was difficult for young Taiwanese to embark because they were all busy with their work.

On 9 February 2006, President Chen met with Taiwanese Muslims who had just come back from Saudi Arabia for performing the Hajj pilgrimage in January 2006. He said that Taiwan needs to have some of the Islamic spirit of standing in awe of the supreme God, upholding peace and justice, helping the weak and poor, promoting social stability, being content with what one is and working hard. The President urged Taiwanese Muslims to introduce the doctrine and spirit of Islam to their compatriots to enhance exchanges between the Muslim societies and other sectors in Taiwan. He also expressed government's concern for the Islamic development to promote religious harmony and added that the government always pays great attention to religious development and encourages all religions in Taiwan to communicate with one another to promote mutual tolerance and respect and to serve as a driving force for stability, peace and prosperity. He stressed that any minority religion in Taiwan is respected and enjoys full protection under the law.

On 23 January 2007, President Chen met again with Taiwanese Muslims who had just come back from Hajj in December 2006. The President congratulated the pilgrims for successfully completing the journey and praised the Chinese Muslim Association (CMA) as an important asset of Taiwan, saying that the association has successfully promoted the frequent contacts and exchanges between Taiwan and the Muslim worlds, and serves as the communication window for Taiwan to those nations. He said that Islam is the current fastest growing religion in the world and has a major role and contribution to the people and civilization. The core value of Islam is that there is only one God, people should do good deeds and people should love their fellow men and citizens. He personally believes that Taiwanese Muslims must emphasize the principle of Islam that stresses peace and love in order to enable others to understand the true nature of Islam. He further added that in recent years, Taiwan has made significant progress in expanding affairs with the Muslim world, creating a win-win situation for all parties involved and also triggering more interest in Islam among Taiwanese people. Although there are only around 60,000 Taiwanese Muslims, this community has made Taiwan becomes more diverse and richer in culture. He assured to the local Muslims that the Muslim people in Taiwan will always enjoy religious freedom and that the government will pay close attention to any raising needs to the group. He also hoped that Taiwanese Muslims will participate in Islamic-related international affairs and play even more role in helping Taiwan solidifies itself with the Islamic nations.

On 6 December 2011, Vice President Vincent Siew commended members of Taiwanese Muslim delegates for completing their 2011 Hajj pilgrimage in November 2011. The delegation was headed by Chu Yun-ching, former chairperson of CMA. In his remark, Siew said that Islam is one of the most influential religion in the world with 1.7 billion of followers. Its main principle is respecting God, helping the poor, doing good, preventing evil and practicing respect and tolerance. All of these teachings have made indelible contributions to civilizations. According to Siew, King Faisal bin Abdulaziz Al Saud of Saudi Arabia had reassured the oil supply to Taiwan during the 1973 oil crisis. Saudi Arabia also has helped Taiwan in providing interest-free loans to help Taiwan complete its Ten Major Construction Projects during the 1970s. Finally he said that the caring and peace-loving spirit of Islam is an important asset for all people, and that the Taiwanese should not forget their deep friendship with the Muslim world.

During the 2012 Hajj pilgrimage, Taiwanese adviser to CMA, Ibrahim Chao, called for the foreign Hajj mission to educate the pilgrims about Hajj matters before their arrival in Saudi Arabia because one-third of them are not accustomed to modern facilities in the kingdom. Chao also urged Muslims all over the world to get united. He led the 33-member of Hajj delegation from Taiwan.

Before releasing a delegation for the 2013 Hajj pilgrimage at the Presidential Office Building, President Ma Ying-jeou said that Islam has enriched Taiwan's cultural diversity despite being a minority religion. Ma also added that Islam is one of the world's most influential religion, in which it uploads peace and justice, helps and aids the poor and love the people and all things.

After suspending the operation of Taipei Economic and Cultural Representative Office in Jeddah on 27 July 2017, Taiwan deploys the personnel from Taipei Economic and Cultural Representative Office in the Kingdom of Saudi Arabia in Riyadh to assist Taiwanese pilgrims. Upon receiving and congratulating the 2017 hajj pilgrims back to Taiwan, President Tsai Ing-wen stated that Muslim community is a major partner of Taiwan and part of the New Southbound Policy during a meeting with CMA. Tsai said that she hoped to build a more Muslim-friendly Taiwan.

In 2018, there were 37 Hajj pilgrims from Taiwan. Upon receiving the returning Taiwanese from the pilgrimage, President Tsai Ing-wen said to the group for them to foster closer ties with the Muslim world for the sake of mutual benefit and assistance. President Tsai welcomed them with an Arabic greeting and praised Islam for being one of the most influential religion in the world that emphasizes peace, justice and the obligation to help the poor. In September 2019 while receiving representatives from CMA as part of the Hajj's delegation at the Presidential Office Building, President Tsai said that the government would continue working to build a welcoming environment for the Muslims, emphasizing that promoting understanding regarding the New Southbound Policy countries' cultures and customs is important for expanding bilateral relations.

=== Conversion ===
Some of the Taiwanese who converted to Islam is because of the condition for their marriage to Muslim. Some other reported that they are attracted to the faith through contact with Muslim leaders or general reading. Both Chinese Muslim Association and Chinese Muslim Youth League put literature for those who are curious about the religion and the organizations are welcome to those who are curious about the Islamic faith.

Islamic conversion rate in Taiwan is relatively low since most of the Taiwanese Muslims in general do not actively preach their religion as do believers of other religions. The growth of Muslim number among Taiwanese Muslims are mostly because of natural population growth. Annually, Taipei Grand Mosque reports an estimated 100 converts at their mosque and Taipei Cultural Mosque reports 50 converts at their mosque.

=== Muslim cemetery ===
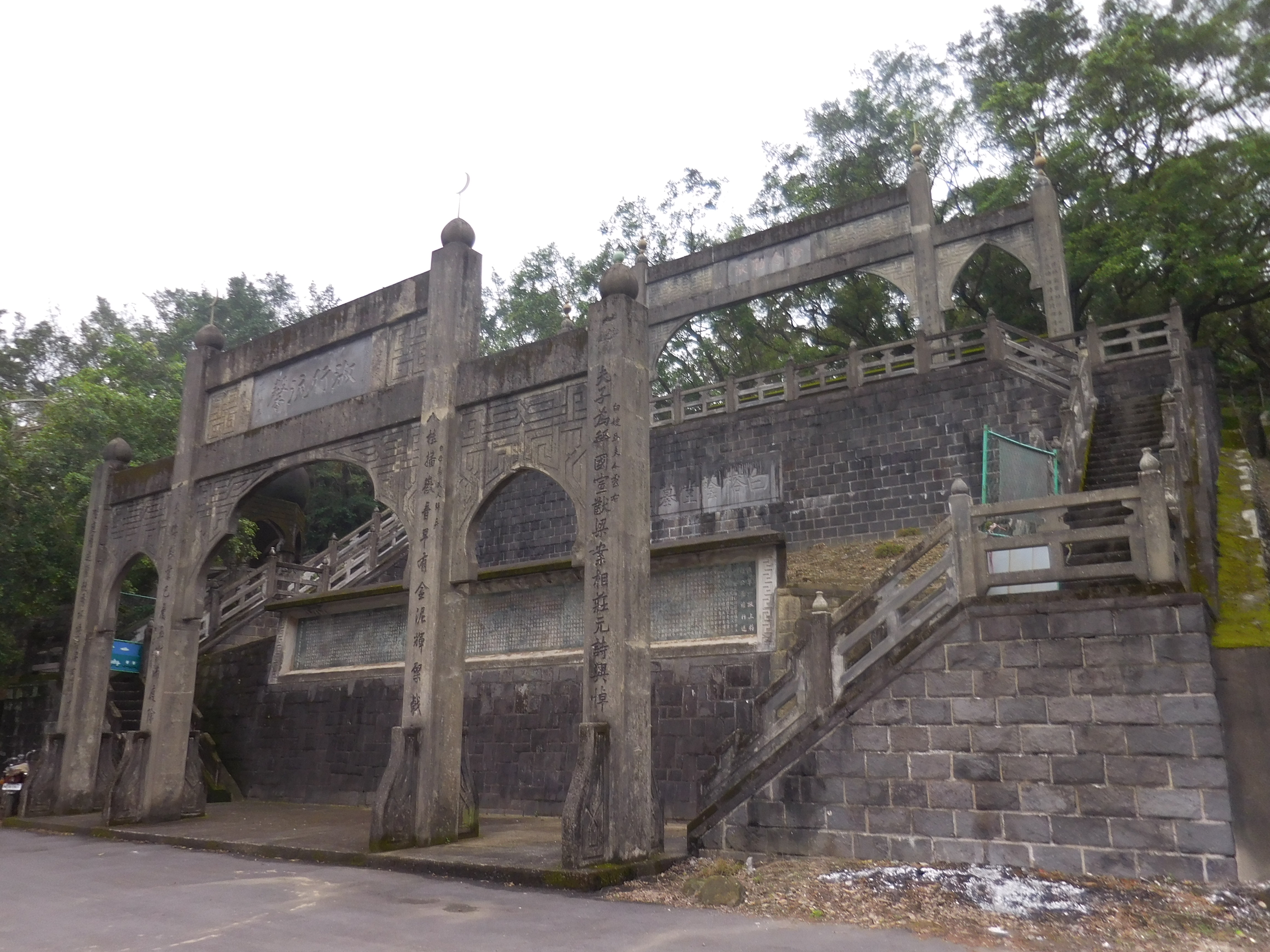
Islamic-style grave of Bai Chongxi at Taipei Muslim Cemetery in Xinyi, Taipei

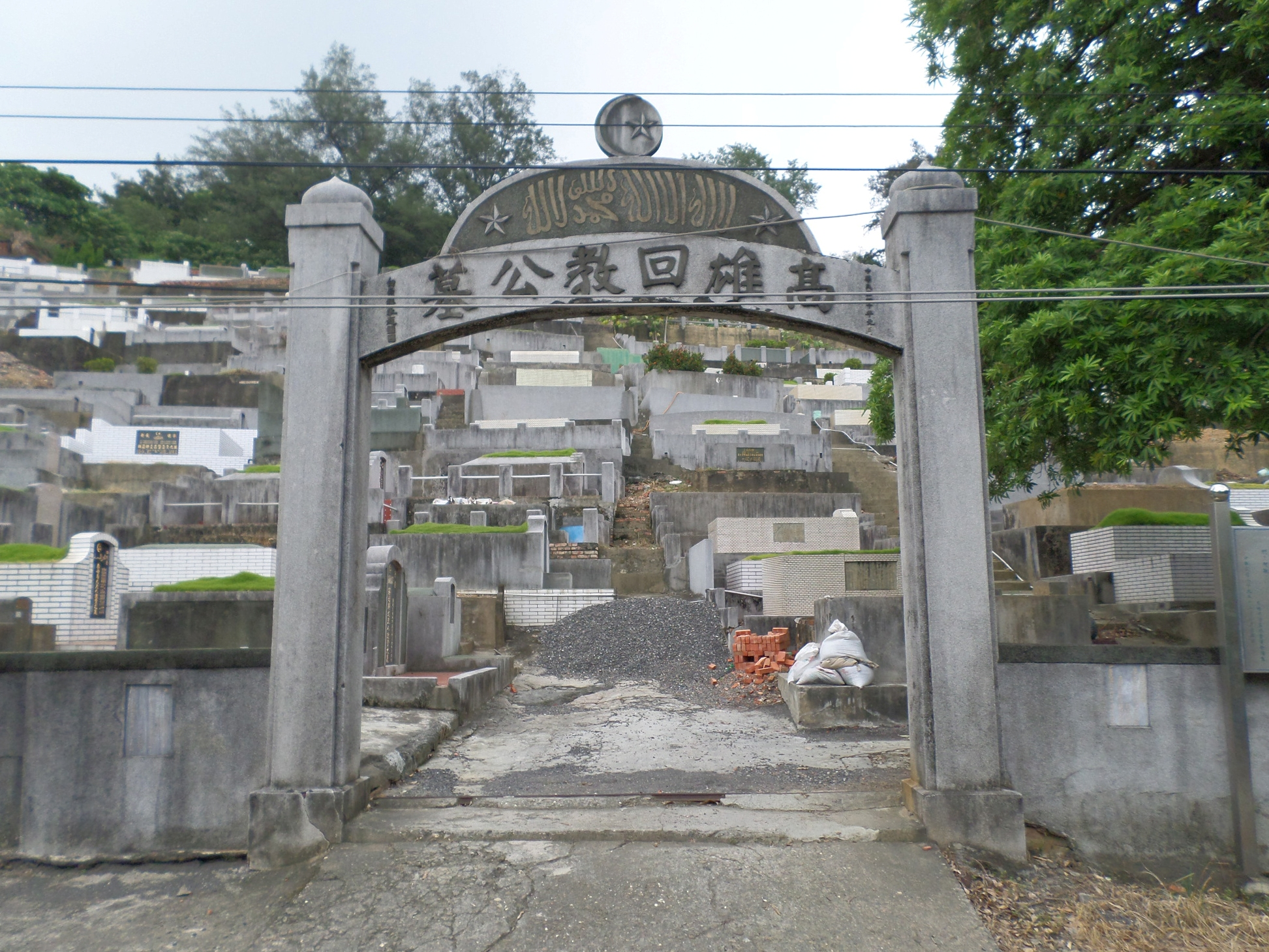
Former Kaohsiung Muslim Cemetery in Sanmin District, Kaohsiung

According to the Islamic law, Muslims need to be buried within maximum of 72 hours after the death. This poses a challenge since the general Chinese burial in Taiwan often takes weeks or months after the person has died. No cremation is used and the dead is buried in the ground. Burial at the sea is permitted if land cannot be reached within 72 hours. Ali Ma Ju-hu, the then-President of Chinese Muslim Association in 2006, had a discussion with the World Assembly of Muslim Youth in Jeddah, Saudi Arabia, on the possibility of finding help in funding burial ground for Muslims in Taipei since the land is very expensive.

==== Taipei ====
Speaking at Taipei Muslim Cemetery in Liuzhangli area of Taipei's Xinyi District on 7 March 2013 where the tomb of late Nationalist General Bai Chongxi is located, Taipei Mayor Hau Lung-pin said that Bai's tomb will form the basis for a Muslim cultural area and Taiwan historical park in Taipei City. Hau made the remark during the late General's 120th birthday anniversary.

Bai's tomb was built in the 1960s and was designated as historical monument by the Taipei City Government in 2012. His graveyard is also called the 'Graveyard of the White Banyan Tree Hall'. His tomb incorporates elements of a mosque dome, minarets, prayer tower and inscriptions by politicians and other historic figures. Next to his tomb lies that of his wife, and also grave plots for his 10 children, of which three have been taken. Whether one of his sons, Pai Hsien-yung, and his other children will one day return from United States to Taiwan remains to be seen.

The cemetery is the largest Muslim cemetery in Taiwan in which over 2,000 Taiwanese Muslims are buried at the site. In this Muslim Cemetery complex also lies the tomb of Yulbars Khan.

==== Kaohsiung ====
Kaohsiung used to house the Muslim cemetery called the Kaohsiung Muslim Cemetery (Chinese: 高雄回教公墓; pinyin: Gāoxióng Huíjiào Gōngmù) within the Fudingjin Cemetery (Chinese: 覆鼎金公墓; pinyin: Fùdǐngjīn Gōngmù) at Dingjin 1st Lane in Sanmin District.

In October 2017, works on the new Muslim cemetery in Shanlin District, named Guizhen Park (traditional Chinese: 歸真園區; simplified Chinese: 归真园区; pinyin: Guīzhēn Yuánqū) started and completed on 2 April 2018. Occupants from the Kaohsiung Muslim Cemetery were moved to the new cemetery and was completed on 28 March 2018. The relocation move faced objection initially from the Chinese Muslim Association, stating that the relocation plan did not follow the Muslim principles. After two public hearings with the local Muslim communities, the association then could accept the plan. Kaohsiung City Government exhumed the old grave and moved the remains to the new site. It also sent a delegation to Malaysia to learn Muslim cemetery relocation. The new cemetery spans over an area of 1,840 m^{2} and costs around NT$60 million.

==== Tainan ====
Tainan is also planning to create cemeteries for the Muslims.

=== Tourism for Muslims ===
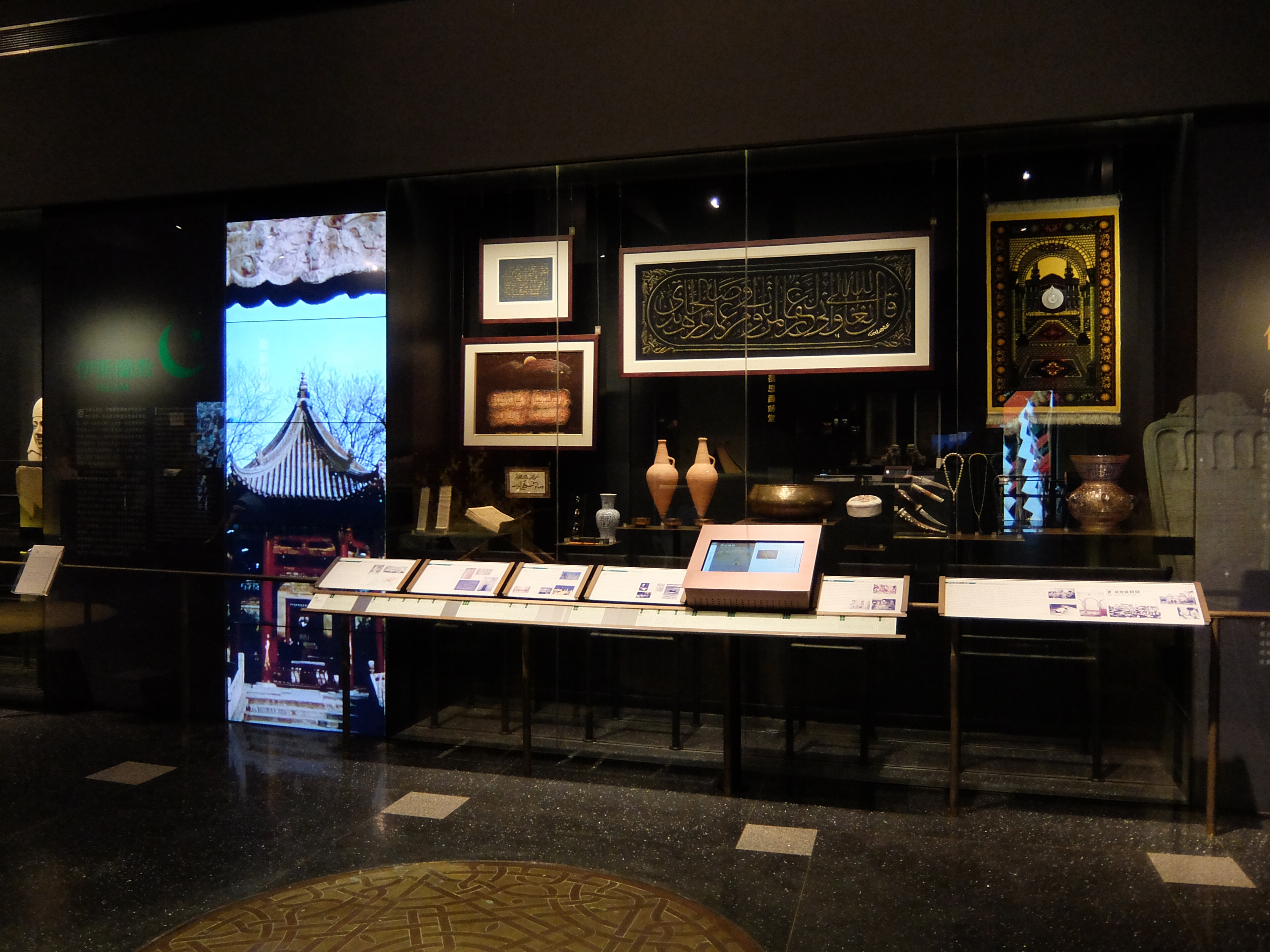
The Islam section of the Museum of World Religions in New Taipei

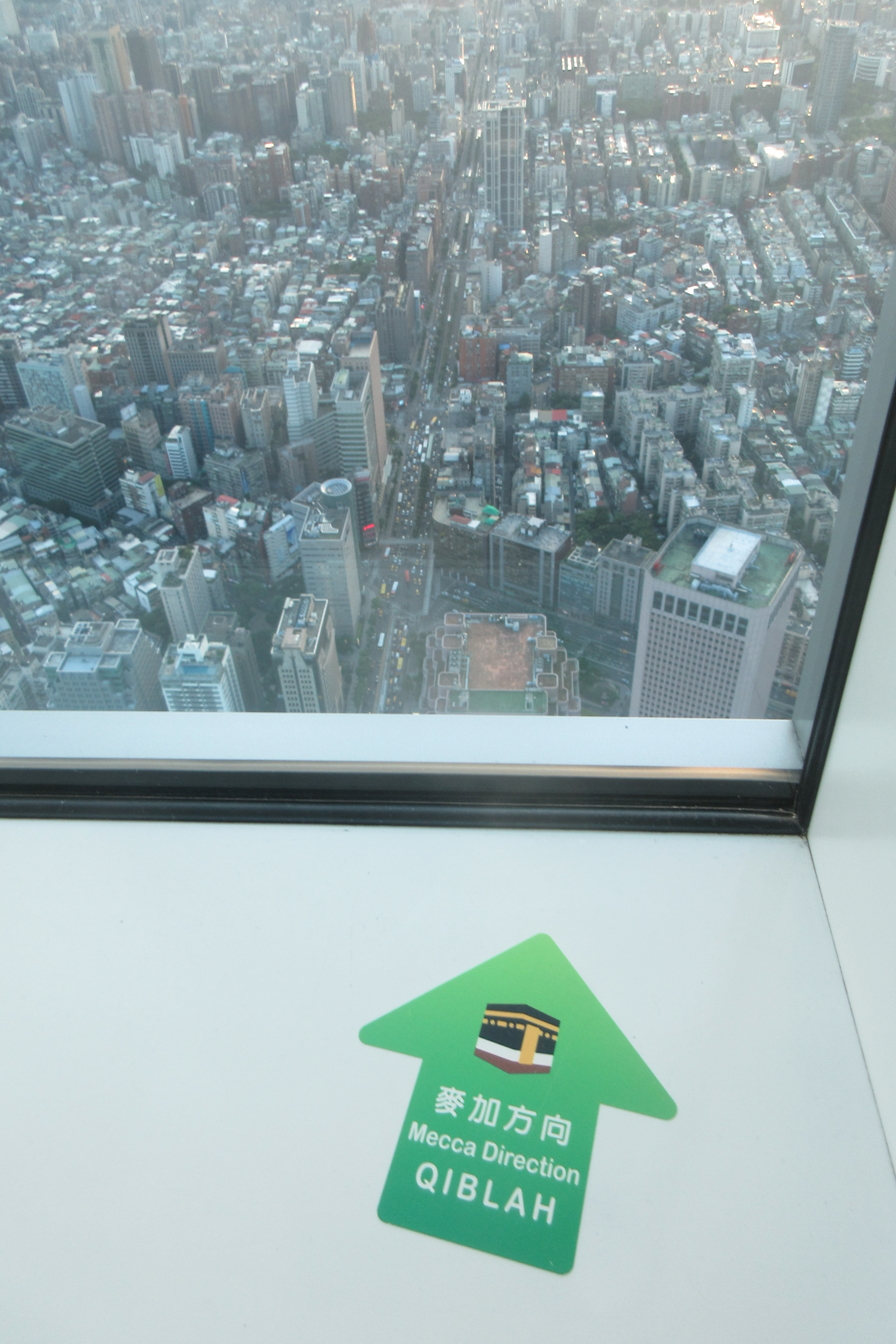
Mecca direction at Taipei 101 observatory deck

Since 2011, Taiwan has been working hard to capture the growing market of Muslim travelers, such as providing more and more Muslim-friendly restaurants and hotels, including facilities such as signs pointing to the direction of Kaaba for prayer, and shooting promotional movies. The majority of Muslim travelers to Taiwan come from Northwest China and Southeast Asian countries, especially Malaysia, Indonesia, Singapore and Brunei. Tourism Bureau reported 200,000 visitors from Muslim-majority countries came to Taiwan in 2015. In 2016, Taiwan included new six Middle East countries into their e-visa program to boost more tourist arrivals from Muslim countries.

In 2012, the Kuala Lumpur Office of the Taiwan Visitor Association distributed 20,000 free copies of the Traveling in Taiwan for Muslims guide book which list down all of the mosques and Halal eateries, as well as Muslim-friendly tourist attractions and accommodation in the island. Tony Wu, director of the Kuala Lumpur Office, said that Taiwan has more than 100 Halal restaurants and that his office plan to raise the annual Malaysian visitors to Taiwan from 350,000 to 400,000. In September 2014, Taiwan took part in promoting its 51 Muslim-friendly restaurants and hotels as well as its 13 scenic areas which have Muslim prayer rooms during the MATTA Fair in Malaysia in a bid to attract Malaysian visitors.

In 2015, Taiwan was ranked top 10 non-Muslim tourist destination among Muslim travelers by the Global Muslim Travel Index due to its safe travel environment, airport services and Muslim travelers needs awareness and reach out. And in 2019, the island was listed as the third Muslim-friendly destination for non-Organisation of Islamic Cooperation (OIC) countries. In 2021, it achieved the second position along with the United Kingdom. At the Halal in Travel Award 2022, Taiwan was recognized as the Inclusive Destination of the Year among non-IOC countries.

Three most popular tourist destinations among Muslim travelers in Taipei are Ximending, Taipei 101 and Dadaocheng. The religion of Islam is well-represented at the collections at Museum of World Religions in Yonghe District, New Taipei. The observatory deck on the 89th floor of Taipei 101 includes the direction of Mecca.

=== Islamic artifacts ===
In 2023, the Taiwan Book Hospital of National Taiwan Library restored a 500-year-old Quran artifact. The book was given to Tzu Chi from a Turkish volunteer in 2021.

=== Muslim-related events ===
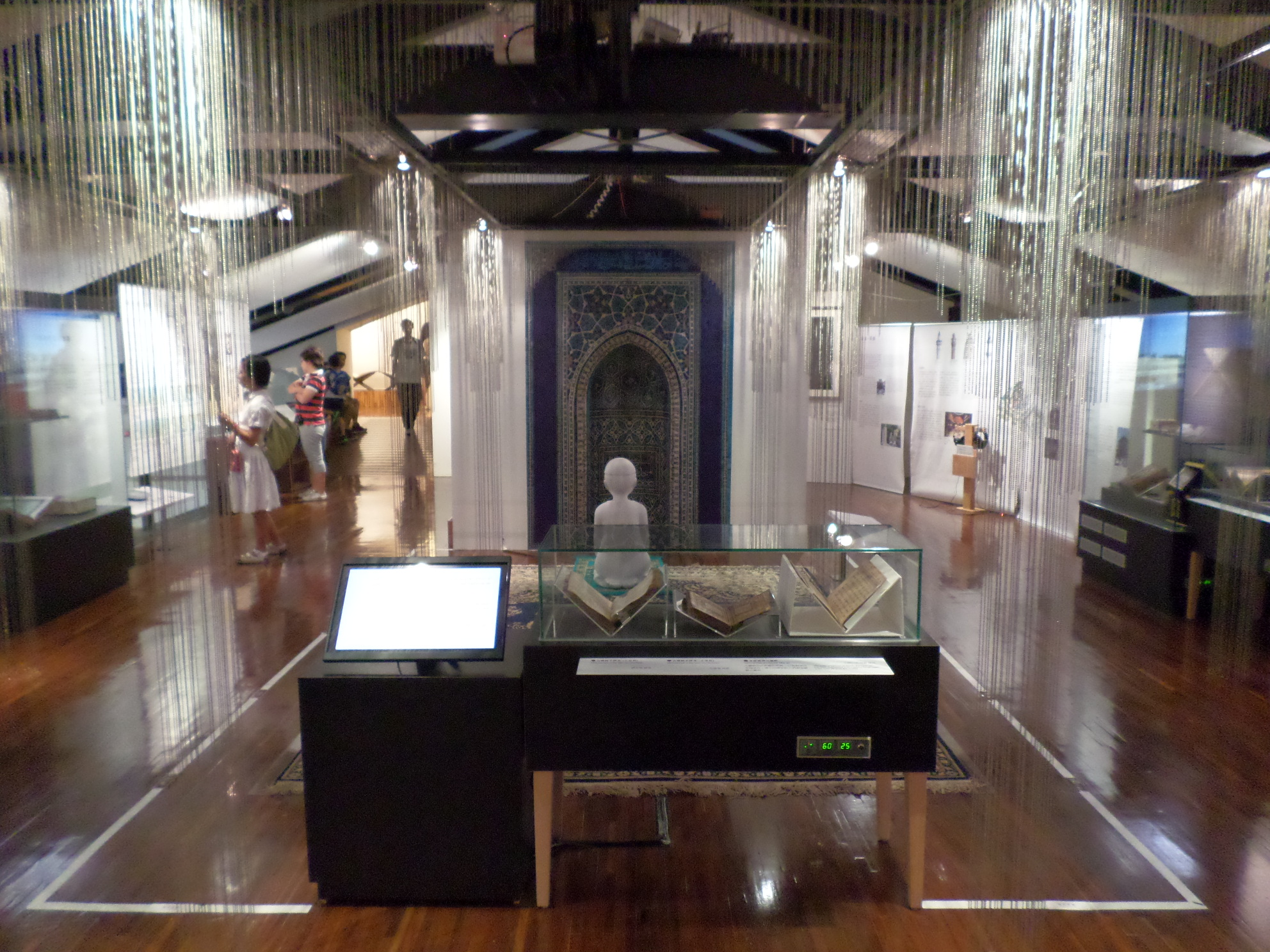
The Exhibition of Islamic Life and Culture at National Taiwan Museum

In 2001, the World Assembly of Muslim Youth with cooperation with CMA held the Summer Muslim Youth Camp to let Muslim brothers know each other and young Muslims to know more about Islam in a non-Muslim society.

In 2004, an international seminar on Islam was held in Taipei where Muslim scholars presented their papers on Islamic issues such as religion, economy, politics and culture. The seminar also provided the local Muslims an opportunity to understand those important issues around the world.

In August 2013, New Taipei organized the Islam Culture Week to enhance residents' understanding of Islam due to the lack of the familiarity with the religion and culture. The festival, held at the New Taipei City Hall, featured the Islamic handicraft, cuisine and other cultural elements. New Taipei itself is home to around 30,000 Muslims, making it one of the biggest city in Taiwan in terms of Muslim population. The secretary-general of Chinese Muslim Association (CMA) added that Taiwan could benefit a lot by understanding Islam, such as it will make things easier for Taiwan to do export and import trading with the growing Muslim countries, as well as attracting more visitors from various Islamic countries.

In January–September 2014, National Taiwan Museum held an exhibition showing the cultural and religious objects from the Islamic world entitled The Exhibition of Islamic Life and Culture (traditional Chinese: 文化與生活特展; simplified Chinese: 文化与生活特展; pinyin: Wénhuà Yǔ Shēnghuó Tè Zhǎn). The exhibition displayed more than 200 items, featuring Quran manuscripts, Muslim clothes, caps, prayer beads, mats, incense burners, tapestries etc. The exhibition was organized by the museum, Taiwan Association of Islamic Studies and National Chengchi University (NCCU). NCCU President Wu Se-hwa expressed that the exhibition would help Taiwanese people gain a better understanding of Islamic culture and lead to further exchanges between the two sides. In conjunction with the main exhibition, the organizers also hold some spin-off events, such as Halal food fair, Muslim music concert, Islamic calligraphy demonstrations and tour to Taipei Grand Mosque.

A two-day event of international symposium addressing contemporary challenges facing Muslim minorities was held in Taipei on 13–14 April 2015. Organized by Muslim World League, Ministry of Foreign Affairs and several non-governmental organizations, the event was attended by participants from more than 20 countries and territories. Speaking at the opening ceremony, Foreign Affairs Minister David Lin said that the symposium represents a confidence by the world Muslim community in the promotion of religious equality by the government. Lin also added that Taiwan has helped the conflicts happening in parts of Iraq and Syria by aiding more than US$8.25 million in assistance, including 350 prefabricated shelters to refugees.

The 16th General Assembly of the Regional Islamic Dawah Council of Southeast Asia and the Pacific (RISEAP) was held in December 2015 in Taipei, the first time in Taiwan. The annual assembly was attended by 80 religious leaders and scholars from 23 countries and territories in the region.

In 2017, the Islamic Cultural Fair was held at Daan Forest Park in Da'an District, Taipei. The event was jointly organized by CMA and the Department of Information and Tourism of Taipei City Government. It featured 60 vendor booths promoting Muslim cultures in Taiwan. It was held in conjunction with the 80th anniversary of CMA.

On 29 March 2017, the Tourism Bureau of Tainan City Government organized a seminar in West Central District, Tainan on providing Muslim-friendly accommodations. The aim was to encourage the local hotels to provide Muslim-friendly facilities and Halal-certified meals in their premises, which in turn would transform Tainan into a Muslim-friendly city and attract more Muslim visitors.

Launched in 2017, the Taiwan Muslim Youth Exchange Program is an annual event initiative of the Ministry of Foreign Affairs to booth exchanges between people-to-people and mutual understanding between Taiwan and countries of New Southbound Policy.

The National Cheng Kung University organized the NCKU World Islam Campus Summit 2018 (traditional Chinese: 成大世界伊斯蘭校園高峰會; simplified Chinese: 成大世界伊斯兰校园高峰会; pinyin: Chéngdà Shìjiè Yīsīlán Xiàoyuán Gāofēng Huì) at their campus on 6–7 June 2018 at their Tainan campus. The summit involved experts from academics, literary, art and business sectors, who shared their experience in addressing issues related to Islam and ways to create a better environment for Muslims in Taiwan. The summit was also attended by acting Tainan Mayor Li Meng-yen. Mayor Li made a statement that his government aim to make Tainan become a Muslim-friendly city.

During the 2019 Food Taipei which was held on 19–22 June at Taipei Nangang Exhibition Center in Nangang District, Taipei, Halal Taiwan pavilion took part in the exhibition, showcasing various booths on foods, beverages and wellness products made accordance to the Islamic law.

On 28–29 December 2019, an open-air festival at Daan Forest Park in Da'an District, Taipei was held with the name Islamic Cultural and Halal Food Festival. There were around 70 vendors offering various Islamic food, crafts and cultural experiences to the public. The event was co-organized by the Chinese Muslim Association and Taipei City Government.

On 9–18 April 2021, an event named the Islamic Cultural Exhibition was held at the Wen-hua Gallery and Culture Corridors of Sun Yat-sen Memorial Hall in Taipei. The exhibition consisted of Arabic calligraphy, Islamic artifacts, Islamic architectures and the development of Islam in Taiwan.

In conjunction with UN Arabic Language Day, the National Chengchi University hosted the celebration for the very first time in Taiwan in 2022. In 2023, National Central Library hosted the event with the theme Arabic — the Language of Poetry and Arts. The opening ceremony was attended by representatives from the Saudi Arabian Trade Office in Taipei and also Jordan and Oman.

=== Retails ===
Fashion retail Uniqlo began to sell hijab since summer 2016 at their Taiwan stores. There are also a growing number of other shops selling Muslim fashion clothes.

=== Social challenges ===
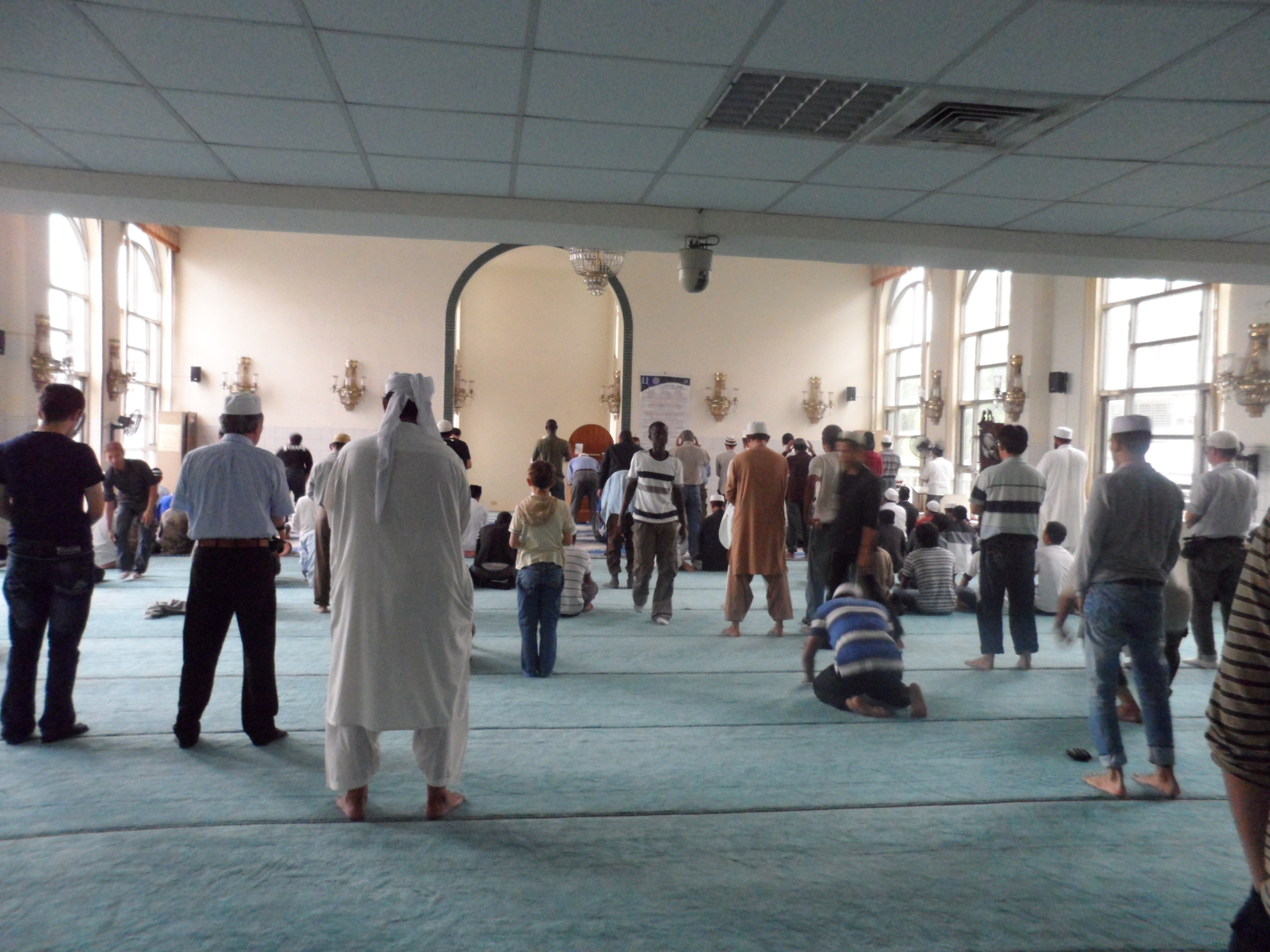
Friday prayer at Kaohsiung Mosque

Islam is generally perceived to be alien to traditional Chinese culture by the general Taiwanese population despite the fact that Taiwan is a society with freedom of religion and high tolerance. Generally there are no negative perceptions of Islam in Taiwan; additionally, Muslims in Taiwan enjoy complete freedom.

Practicing the Five Pillars of Islam, especially the prayer, is difficult in the fast-paced Taiwanese working and living environment. Many Muslims cannot attend the Friday prayer in the mosques, due to fact that weekend holidays in Taiwan fall on Saturdays and Sundays. Therefore, this means that many Muslims miss out on teachings by the imams, elders or international scholars held in association with the sermon of the Friday prayer. Many younger generations also prefer to spend their limited leisure time in places like karaoke, bars, nightclubs and cafes due to the lack of interest and the perception that there is little to gain from religion when success in Chinese culture is defined by wealth and status.

Practicing strict Islamic dietary laws is another problem due to the fact that Taiwan does not have many widely available Halal restaurants or dining places. However, the growing presence of Muslim Indonesian workers in Taiwan has helped to establish more Halal restaurants serving Indonesian cuisine around Taiwan. Muslims serving in the Armed Forces are generally given separate utensils and supplied with fish, in which they will cook for themselves.

The highly competitive environment in Taiwanese schools makes it difficult for parents to persuade their children to spend extra time outside of their school subjects to study the Arabic language or Quran.

The extremely low number of Taiwanese Muslims leads to Muslims in isolated areas marrying non-Muslims or converts who are unfamiliar with the Islamic religion and cultures. Elderly Taiwanese Muslims speak oft their fear that one day Islam in Taiwan might one day just be a historical fact, repeating the process that happened in Lukang, Changhua.

On 2 October 2016, Taipei Mayor Ko Wen-je made a remark that the Taipei City Government should allocate a budget for the construction of a larger mosque in Taipei which is near to Taipei Metro station because overcrowding at Taipei Grand Mosque has become a continuous problem.

In August 2021, Vice President William Lai and Pan-Green Coalition were mocked in PTT Bulletin Board System by using mistranslated references to some Islamic terminologies. The incident was decried by the Islamic Association of Taiwan in their statement.

== Islam-related organizations ==
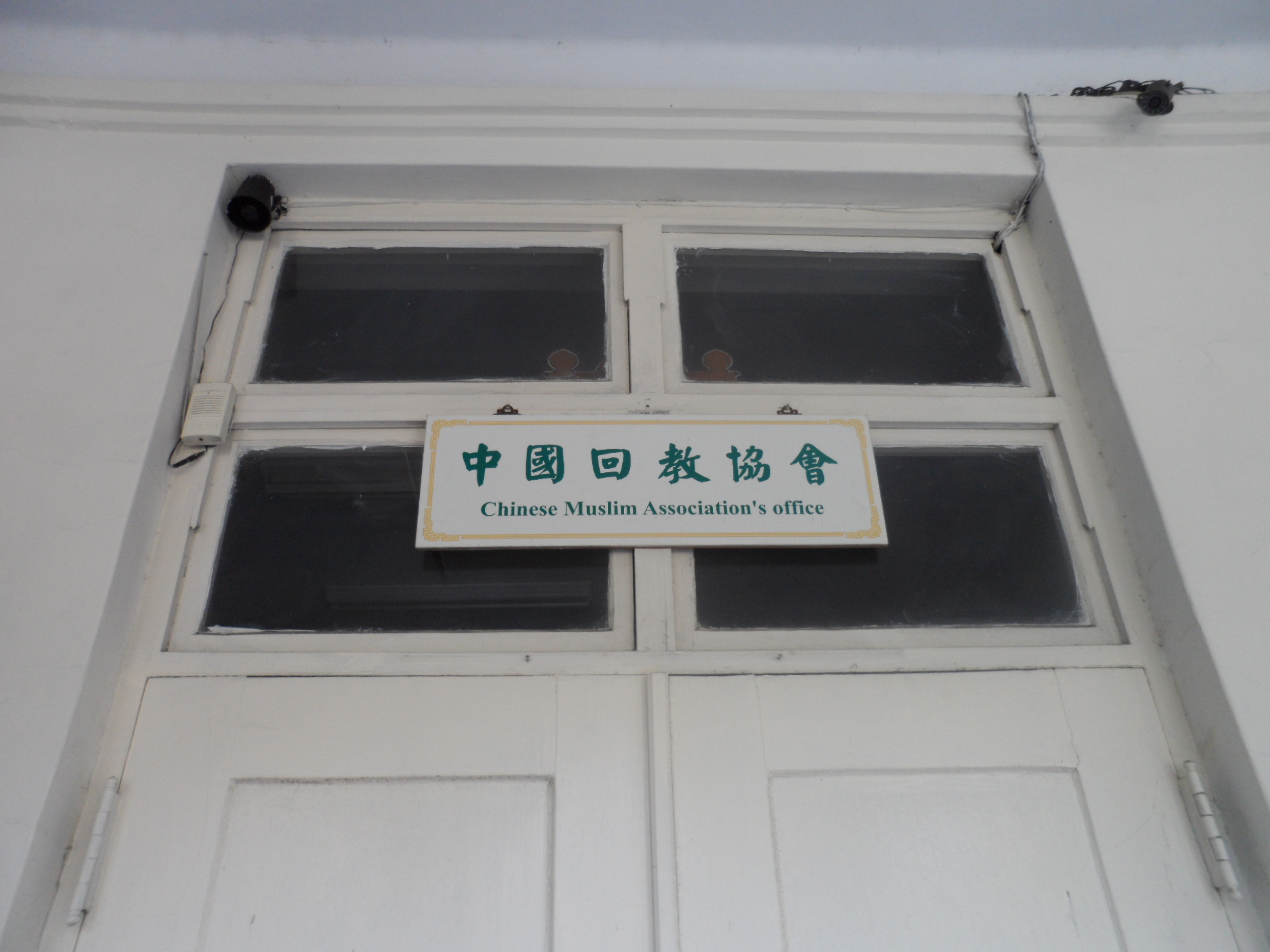
Office of the Chinese Muslim Association at Taipei Grand Mosque

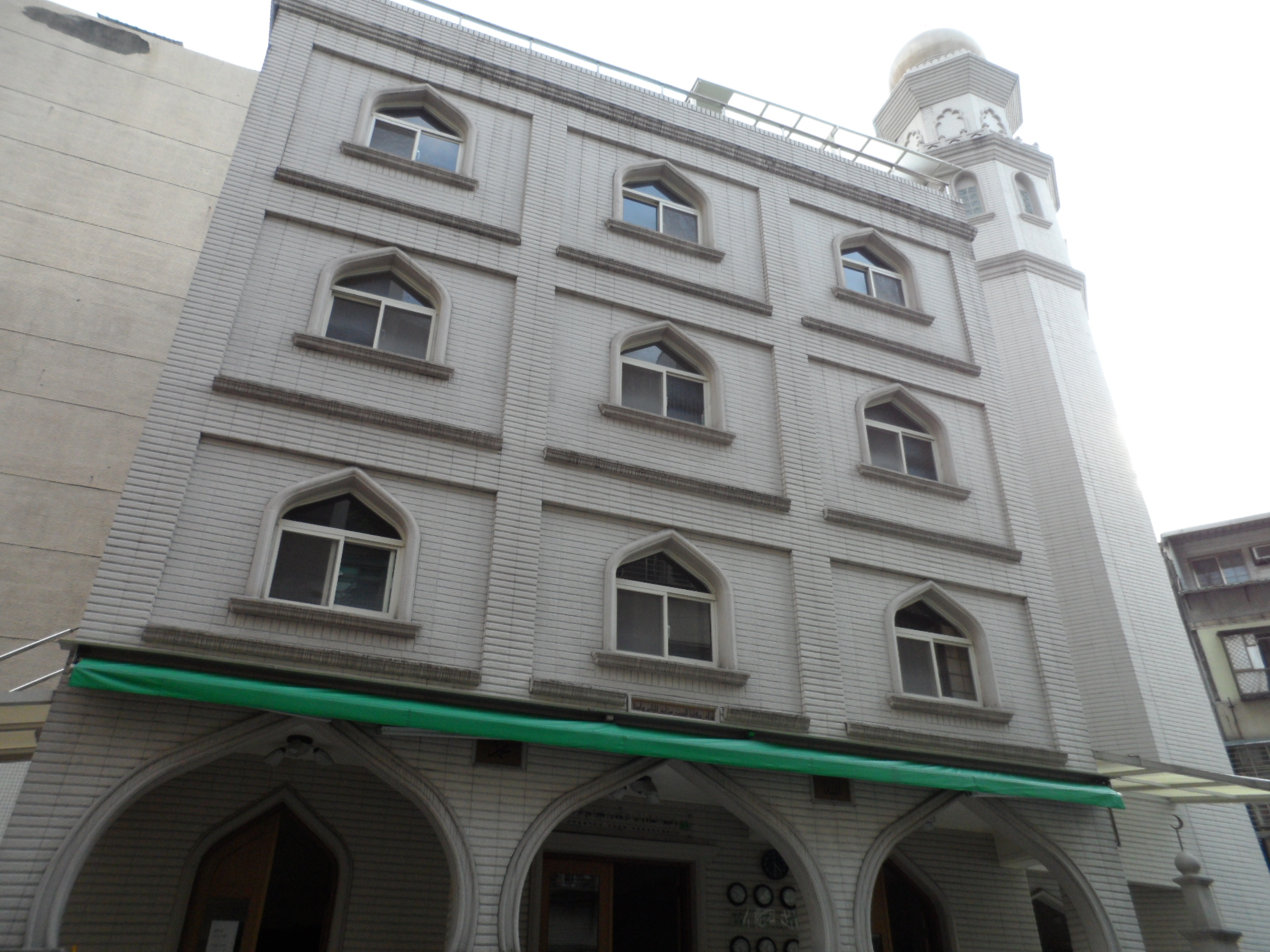
Taipei Cultural Mosque in Zhongzheng, Taipei houses the office of the Chinese Muslim Youth League and Taiwan Halal Integrity Development Association

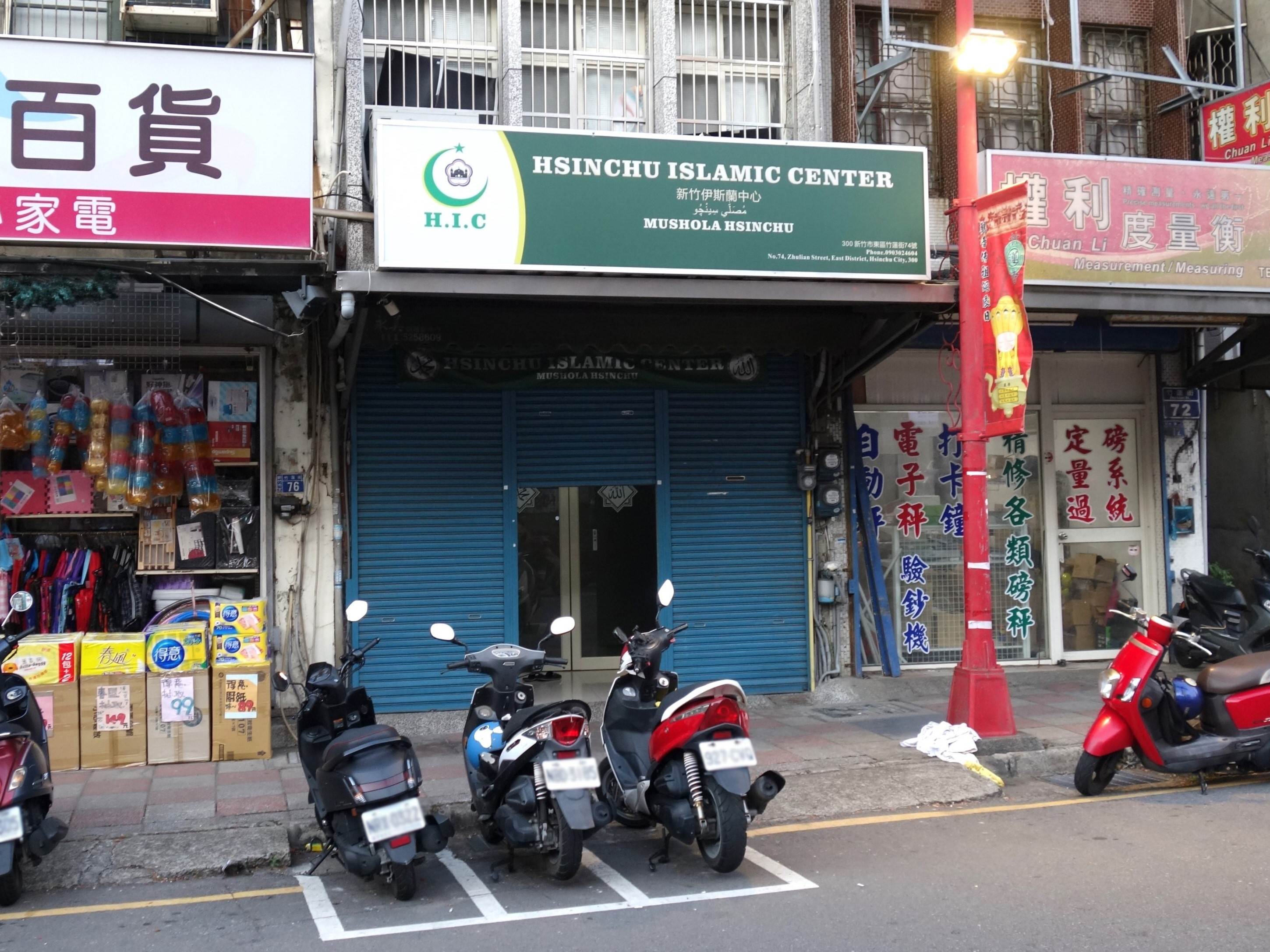
Hsinchu Islamic Center in East District, Hsinchu City

=== Chinese Muslim Association ===
The Chinese Muslim Association (CMA; traditional Chinese: 中國回教協會; simplified Chinese: 中国回教协会; pinyin: Zhōngguó Huíjiào Xiéhuì) is an organization of Chinese Muslims in Taiwan. It was founded in 1938 in mainland China and it runs the Taipei Grand Mosque. Bai Chongxi was the first chairperson of the association.

=== Islamic Circle of Taiwan ===
The Islamic Circle of Taiwan (ICT; traditional Chinese: 台灣伊斯蘭團結協會; simplified Chinese: 台湾伊斯兰团结协会; pinyin: Táiwān Yīsīlán Tuánjié Xiéhuì) is a Muslim organization based in East District, Hsinchu City. It was inaugurated on 8 August 2020 by the Ministry of the Interior. It runs the Hsinchu Islamic Center in the city and other parts of Taiwan by providing Islamic education to adults and children.

=== Islamic Association of Taiwan ===
The Islamic Association of Taiwan (IAT; traditional Chinese: 台灣伊斯蘭協會; simplified Chinese: 台湾伊斯兰协会; pinyin: Táiwān Yīsīlán Xiéhuì is a Muslim organization in Taiwan. It was founded on 10 January 2016. It is based in Hualien City, Hualien County.

=== Chinese Muslim Youth League ===
The Chinese Muslim Youth League (traditional Chinese: 中國回教青年會; simplified Chinese: 中国回教青年会; pinyin: Zhōngguó Huíjiào Qīngniánhuì) is an organization of Chinese Muslims in Taiwan. It was founded in the early 1930s and it runs the Taipei Cultural Mosque. As a rival group, the Chinese Muslim Association competes with it in Taiwan.

=== Chinese Islamic Cultural and Educational Foundation ===
The Chinese Islamic Cultural and Educational Foundation (traditional Chinese: 中國回教文化教育基金會; simplified Chinese: 中国回教文化教育基金会; pinyin: Zhōngguó Huíjiào Jiàoyù Wénhuà Jījīn Huì) is the first cultural foundation for Islamic education in Taiwan. It was established in 1976 by brothers Chang Zixuan (Chinese: 常子萱) and Chang Zichun (Chinese: 常子春). It is based at Taipei Grand Mosque.

=== Taiwan Muslim Association ===
The Taiwan Muslim Association (TMA; traditional Chinese: 台湾輔導穆斯林協會; simplified Chinese: 台湾辅导穆斯林协会; pinyin: Táiwān Fǔdǎo Mùsīlín Xiéhuì) is a Muslim organization in Taiwan. It was founded on 24 April 2016. It is based at At-Taqwa Mosque.

=== Taiwan Halal Integrity Development Association ===
The Taiwan Halal Integrity Development Association (THIDA; traditional Chinese: 台灣清真產業品質保證推廣協會; simplified Chinese: 台湾清真产业品质保证推广协会; pinyin: Táiwān Qīngzhēn Chǎnyè Pǐnzhí Bǎozhèng Tuīguǎng Xiéhuì) was inaugurated on 7 May 2011 in Taipei as the body to give the Halal certification to Taiwanese food products. It is based at Taipei Cultural Mosque.

=== Indonesian Muslim Family in Taiwan ===
The Indonesian Muslim Family in Taiwan (KMIT; Indonesian: Keluarga Muslim Indonesia di Taiwan, traditional Chinese: 台灣印尼穆斯林之家; simplified Chinese: 台湾印尼穆斯林之家; pinyin: Táiwān Yìnní Mùsīlín Zhījiā) is the umbrella organization that leads all of the Indonesian Muslim associations in Taiwan. It was inaugurated in on 2 December 2007 at the Taipei Cultural Mosque in Taipei. Associations under the KMIT are MTYT Taipei, FOSMIT Zhongli, IMIT Taichung, Kitas Taya Taichung, Imdat, MTYCIT Chiayi, FKKBWIT Tainan, IWAMIT Kaohsiung, MTNIH Hualien, PPIH Hualien and FORMMIT.

=== PCI Nahdatul Ulama ===
The main branch of Nahdlatul Ulama (NU) for Taiwan was established in 2008. Currently it has 13 branches, including in Keelung, Guanyin, Taoyuan, Taichung, Changhua, Chiayi, Kaohsiung, Donggang, Pingtung, Yilan, Daxi, Hualien, Pintung, while the head quarter in Taipei. In 2013, the women's youth league of the NU named Fatayah NU was established.

PCI Nahdlatul Ulama then obtained legal recognition from the government on 13 May 2018 under the name 社團法人台北市印尼服務交流協會.

== University Muslim student communities ==
=== Chung Hua University ===
The Chung Hua University in Hsinchu City houses a Muslim student club called the Islam and Culture Association (ICA). The club was founded on 6 January 2010. It aims to gather Muslim students in Chung Hua University and introduce about Islam and the culture to Taiwanese friends in the campus and Taiwan. The club is also a place to introduce the home culture of their members to Taiwanese friends.

=== National Cheng Kung University ===
The National Cheng Kung University in Tainan houses a Muslim student club called the International Muslim Students Association (IMSA). The club was founded on 15 November 2012 with the mission of providing information about Islam and Muslim daily life.

=== National Yang Ming Chiao Tung University ===
The National Yang Ming Chiao Tung University in Hsinchu City houses a Muslim student club called the Muslim Students Club in Hsinchu (HMSC). The club was established to enable the Muslim students from diverse cultures to get together, share their ideas, carry out various activities and welcome new members. They teach weekly Arabic and Islamic studies to the people.

=== National Sun Yat-sen University ===
The National Sun Yat-sen University in Kaohsiung have a Muslim student association called Muslim Students Association NSYSU (MSA NSYSU) was established in 2017. This community was founded to allow Muslim students from different cultures to hold joint worship, Islamic agenda, exchange ideas, and social activities.

=== National Taiwan University of Science and Technology ===
The National Taiwan University of Science and Technology in Taipei houses a Muslim student club called the International Muslim Student Association (IMSA). Due to the fact that the university houses one of the highest Muslim students in Taiwan, the growing Muslim students felt that they need to have a community that can provide basic Islamic and social interactions between Muslim students. Audit was done by the university since 5 May 2012 and the club was established on 22 May 2012.

Even before the establishment of the club, Muslim students in the university had already organized Islamic-related event called the International Muslim Culture Exhibition in November 2011 which features the Islamic science and technology, Islamic food and beverages, Muslim annual events, Muslim history in Taiwan, woman in Islam and Muslim daily life. The purpose of this event was to introduce the unique cultures of Muslim and increase the understanding among different cultures to create peace and harmony. The event was then continued to be held annually by the club.

=== Yuan Ze University ===
The Yuan Ze University in Zhongli District, Taoyuan City houses a Muslim student club called the Yuan Ze University–Muslim Student Association (YZU-MSA). The association held an event entitled Islamic Culture and Exhibition in May 2014 and May 2015.

== Mosques and prayer rooms ==
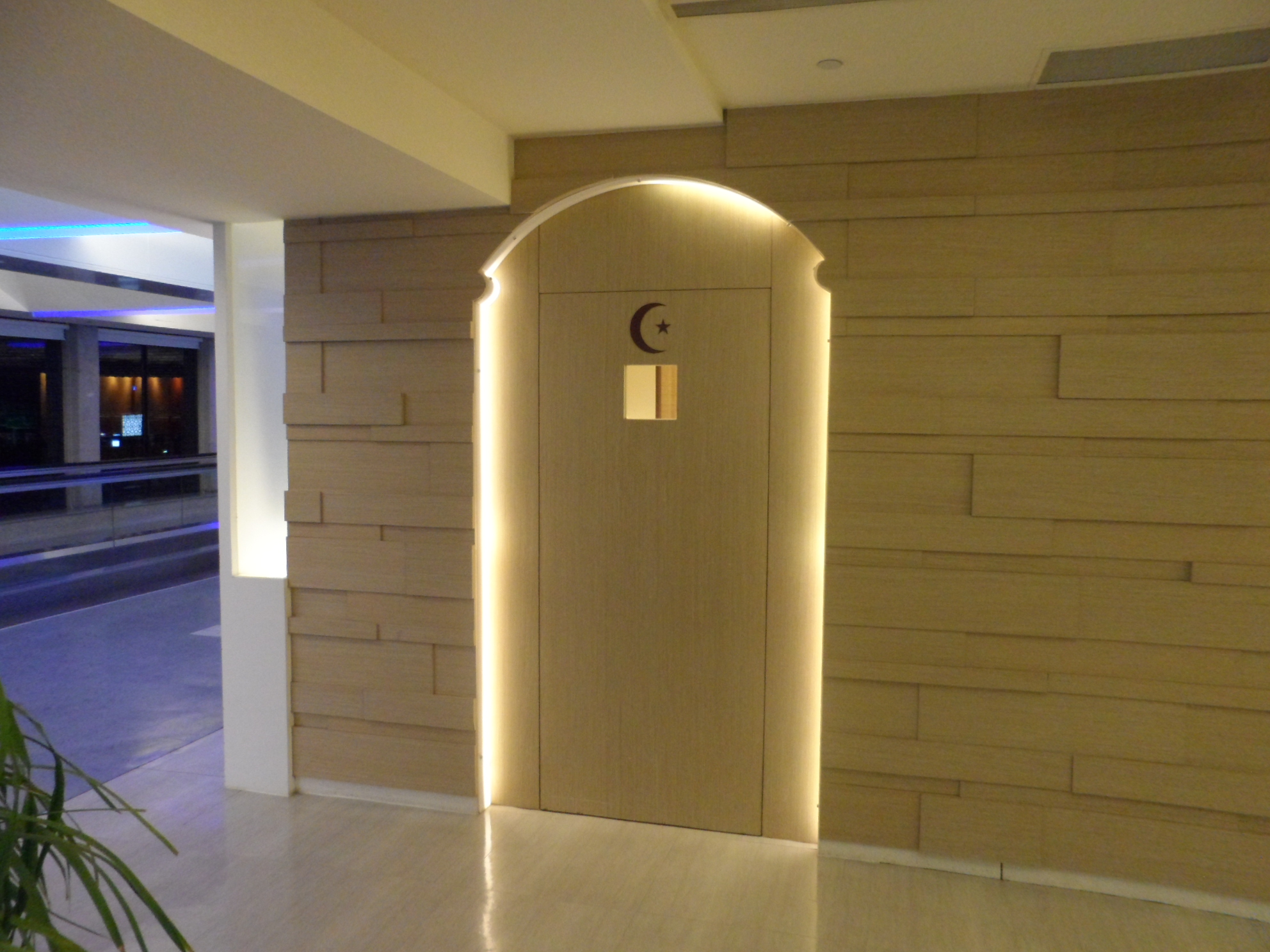
Muslim prayer room at the Terminal 1 transit area of the Taoyuan International Airport

As of 2018, there are eleven mosques in Taiwan. Currently the Taipei City Government plans to build the third one in Taipei in collaboration with the Government of Turkey. Based on the sequence of their publicized establishment date, they are:

- Taipei Grand Mosque in Da'an, Taipei, managed by Chinese Muslim Association
- Kaohsiung Mosque in Lingya, Kaohsiung
- Taipei Cultural Mosque in Zhongzheng, Taipei, managed by Chinese Muslim Youth League
- Taichung Mosque in Nantun, Taichung
- Longgang Mosque in Zhongli, Taoyuan City
- Tainan Mosque in East, Tainan
- At-Taqwa Mosque in Dayuan, Taoyuan City
- Baitul Muslimin Mosque in Su'ao, Yilan County
- An-Nur Tongkang Mosque in Donggang, Pingtung County
- Hualien Al-Falah Mosque in Hualien City, Hualien County

Besides mosques, Taiwan also houses several dedicated small-size Muslim prayer rooms, such as in:

=== Public transportation facilities ===
- Taoyuan International Airport, Taoyuan City – at the transit area of Terminal 1 and Terminal 2
- Taipei Main Station, Taipei – at the basement level in the northeastern corner of the station near to Tamsui–Xinyi Line entrance
- Taichung HSR station, Taichung
- Alishan Station
- National Freeway 3 service area, Qingshui District, Taichung

=== Universities ===
- National Central University, Taoyuan- at 2F, Vivo Plaza (next to the Student Club Center)
- Academia Sinica Mosque, opposite to Hi-Life cafe near Student dormitory
- Chung Hua University, Hsinchu City – at room G212
- Kaohsiung Medical University, Kaohsiung
- National Cheng Kung University, Tainan – at 6th Dormitory of Sheng-Li Campus
- National Yang Ming Chiao Tung University, Hsinchu City – at the basement level of Student Dormitory 13
- National Quemoy University, Kinmen County

=== Tourist places ===
- Alishan National Scenic Area, Chiayi County – at the tourist center
- Chiang Kai-shek Memorial Hall, Taipei
- Discovery Center of Taipei, Taipei
- Leofoo Village Theme Park, Hsinchu County
- National Palace Museum, Taipei
- Shangri-La Leisure Farm, Yilan County
- Southern Branch of the National Palace Museum, Chiayi County
- Taipei 101, Taipei – at the fifth floor
- Taipei Children's Amusement Park, Taipei
- Toucheng Leisure Farm, Yilan County
- Window on World Theme Park, Taoyuan City

=== Other places ===
- Chang Gung Memorial Hospital, Linkou Branch (traditional Chinese: 長庚紀念醫院林口總院; simplified Chinese: 长庚纪念医院林口总院), Taoyuan City
- Hualien Tzu Chi Hospital, Hualien City, Hualien County
- Taipei City Hall, Xinyi, Taipei
- Taipei Medical University Hospital
- Taipei Nangang Exhibition Center, Taipei
- Xiaguzi Fishing Port, Bali, New Taipei

== Notable Muslims who lived in or were born in Taiwan ==
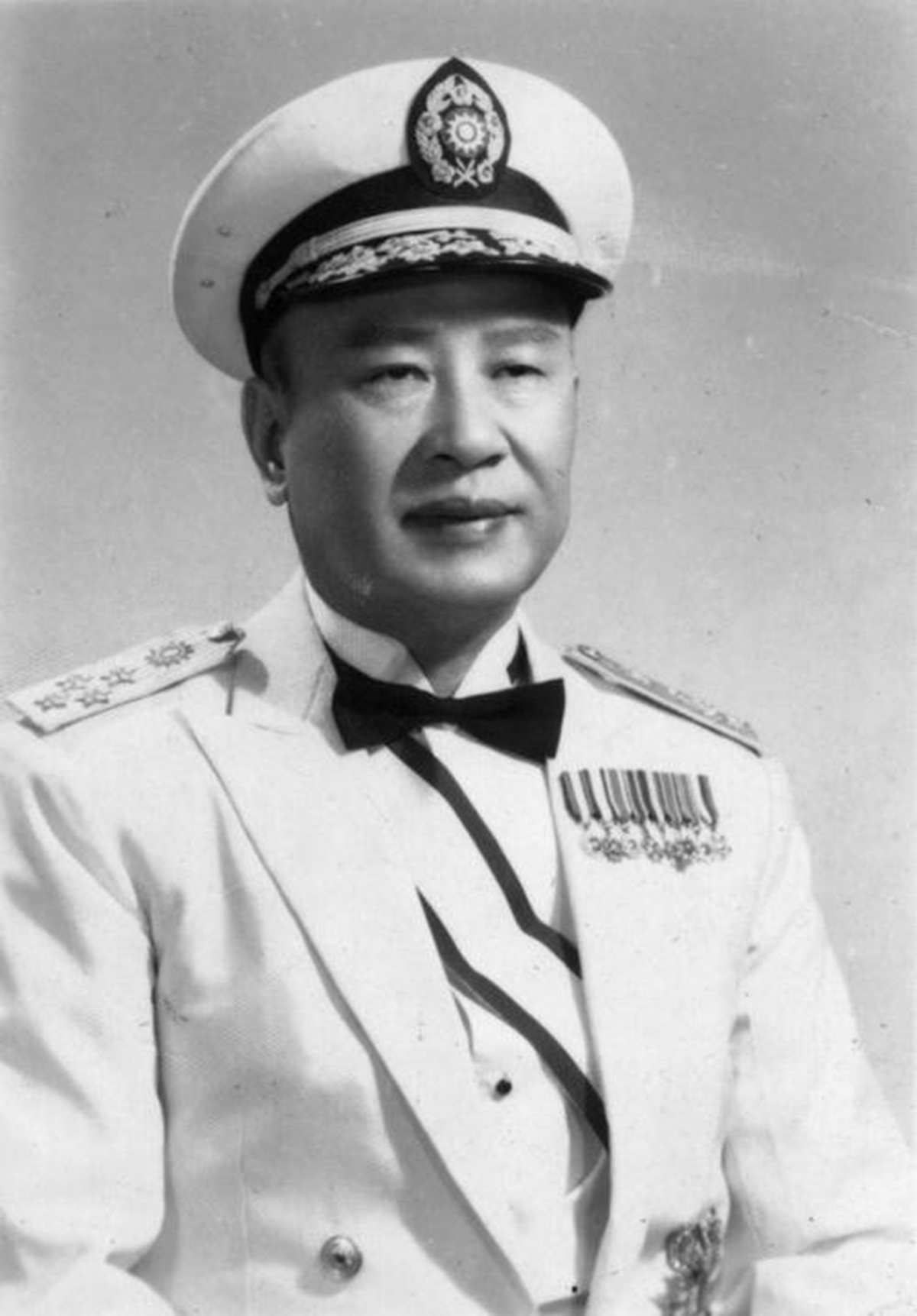
KMT General Bai Chongxi

- Bai Chongxi, a Kuomintang Army General of Hui descent who established the Chinese Muslim Association
- Pai Hsien-yung, son of Bai Chongxi
- Liu Wen-hsiung, legislator from People First Party
- Ma Buqing
- Ma Chengxiang
- Ma Ching-chiang
- Yulbars Khan

== See also ==
- Islam in Hong Kong
- Islam in Macau
- Islam in Sichuan
- Islam in Tibet
- List of mosques in Taiwan
- Ma clique
- Religion in Taiwan
- Uyghur people
