= Antonio Barreto =

Governor of Trinidad in 1784

Antonio Barreto was the governor of the then Spanish colony Trinidad from January or June 1784 until August 1784.

== Biography ==
Barreto was the military commandant of the Guayana Province. In January or June 1784 he was appointed interim governor of the Trinidad province by Francisco Saavedra, governor of the superordinate province of Caracas. His predecessor Juan Francisco Machado, interim governor after the death of Martin de Salaverría, had been dismissed by Saavedra before. The government in Madrid had determined a new governor for Trinidad already, José María Chacón, but Chacón first had to settle his affairs at home and then travel to Trinidad, so there was the necessity to appoint an interim governor. Barreto governed until Chacóns arrival in August 1784.

During Barreto's short term in office, an administrative revolution occurred, but he only contributed to it by continuing the official duties of his predecessor. Back then the capital of Trinidad was San José de Oruña, situated at the foot of the Northern Range northeast of Puerto España. The civil administration of the colony was mainly conducted by a partially autonomous cabildo that was situated in the rather remote San José de Oruña. De Salaverría, who resided at the coast in Puerto de España, had convinced the cabildo to hold their regular meetings there. Barreto kept this custom and thus elevated Puerto de España to a de facto capital. His successor Chacón simply confirmed the change of capital already in place via a law.

Preceded by Juan Francisco Machado	Governor of Trinidad; 1784	Succeeded by José María Chacón
