= Islam in the Dominican Republic =

Islam in Dominican Republic

Total population
- 0,5% of the total population in 2024

Religions
- Sunni Muslims (99%) · Ahmadiyyah (less than 1%)

Languages
- Arabic (liturgical language); Dominican Spanish ·

Related ethnic groups
- Puerto Rican Muslims · Cuban Muslims

Islam in the Dominican Republic is a minority religion. Accurate statistics of religious affiliation are difficult to calculate and there is a wide variation concerning the actual numerical amount. Although the majority of the population is Christian, Muslim community is led by the Círculo Islámico de República Dominicana (the Islamic Circle of Dominican Republic). Currently, the Círculo Islámico estimates that Muslims in Dominican Republic consist of about 30,000 - 50,000 Sunni Muslims and an estimate of 50 Ahmadiyyah that worship in a small house

The Círculo Islámico established the first mosque in the Dominican Republic in the center of Santo Domingo, about a five-minute walk from the Palacio de Policía Nacional and the Universidad Iberoamericana (UNIBE) where Muslims from around the city would have easy access to reach it. They made an agreement with the owner to purchase the land and the building for an amount of 2.85 million pesos. The mosque is open daily for the five prayers (salat) and offers classes on Islamic studies for ladies and children on weekends. They also provided free medical consultation along with a free pharmacy, Consultant Al-Foutory, which is located in a separate building at the back of the mosque. The community is vibrant and diverse economically speaking, due to it bringing to the Dominican society a good amount of doctors, clinics in cities like Constanza and Jarabacoa, important business men, cellphones stores, restaurants, economic consultancy and many more. The Al-Noor Mosque is largely believed to be the only active mosque in the country and receives the bulk of the Muslim population for the two Eids, Ramadan, Salat al Jummah, and the five daily prayers. However, about 5 other mosques are spread all the way inside the country. For example, in Los Llanos neighborhood of San Pedro de Macorix, Dominican Republic. This mosque is led by a converted Dominican Imam. Los Llanos is roughly a 30 minutes drive from the Al-Noor Mosque. The Musalla Al-Hidayya provides Jummah services in the city of Santiago de los Caballeros, and the Musalah Al-Nabawi (address: Av. Espana Plaza Estrella No. 411, Bavaro Punta Cana ) serves local and visiting Muslims in the tourist sector of Bávaro-Punta Cana in the East of the country.

The biggest mosque in the Caribbean is being built in Punta Cana, and is called the Nurulislam Mosque (address: Blvd. Turístico del Este, Punta Cana 23000, Dominican Republic)

== History ==
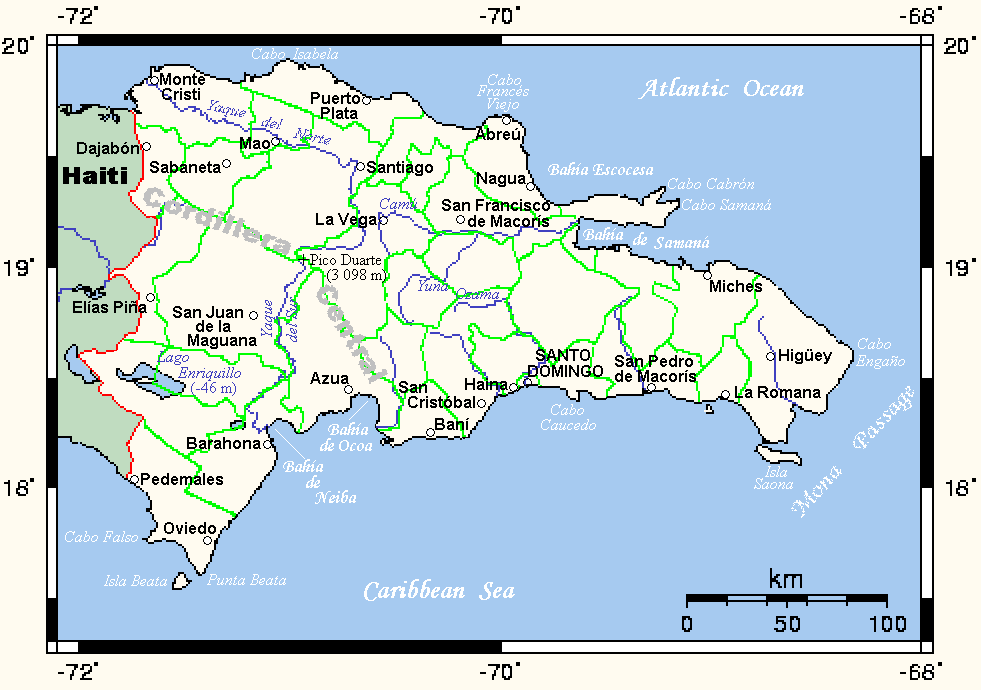
Map of the Dominican Republic

=== Slavery ===
Like other countries in the Caribbean and Latin America, the history of Islam in the Dominican Republic began with the importation of African slaves, who first arrived to the island of Hispaniola (Haiti and the Dominican Republic), beginning in 1502. These people arrived with a rich and ancient culture, although brutal repression and forced conversions gradually diluted their original cultural identity and religions. The first recorded instances of resistance were in 1503, when Nicolás de Ovando, Hispaniola's first royal governor, wrote to Isabella requesting that she prevent further shipments to the colony of enslaved Black ladinos, or persons possessing knowledge of Spanish or Portuguese languages and cultures, but who also often had connections to either Senegambia, Islam, or both. De Ovando had arrived earlier in April 1502 and was already complaining that the ladinos on the island were “a source of scandal to the Indians, and some had fled their owners,” establishing maroon communities in the mountains.

== Present situation ==
Muslim population in the nation was increased by Middle Eastern settlers, mostly Arabs of Lebanese, Syrian, Palestinian and by Pakistanis and other people from the Indian subcontinent.

Brands of Tasawwuf are becoming more and more manifested in the country from native born Dominican Muslims and foreign Muslims who are murids of the Shadhili, Qadiri, and Ba'Alawi Tariqas. The actual figures of the Muslim population growth haved not been officially censused, though some sources give a number of 5,000 to 7,000.

The government of the Dominican Republic has also noticed an increase of Islam in neighboring Haiti.

== Mosques ==
- Al-Noor Mosque
- Noor Al Din Mosque

== See also ==
- Latin American Muslims
- Latino Muslims
- Religion in Dominican Republic
