= Al-Faruq Mosque (Puerto Rico) =

Mosque in Vega Alta, Puerto Rico

- Mezquita de Al-Faruq
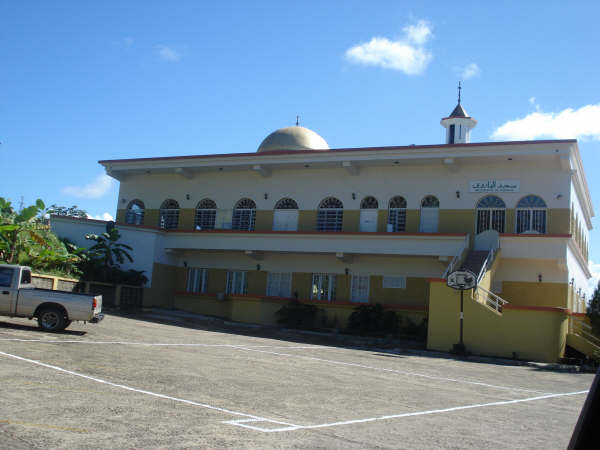

- Location of the mosque in Puerto Rico

Religion
- Affiliation: Islam
- Ecclesiastical or organizational status: Mosque
- Status: Active

Location
- Location: Vega Alta
- Country: Puerto Rico
- Interactive map of Al-Faruq Mosque
- Coordinates: 18.43403°N 66.34389°W

Architecture
- Type: Mosque
- Completed: 1992

Specifications
- Capacity: 1,320 worshipers
- Dome: 1
- Minaret: 1

The Al-Faruq Mosque (Spanish: Mezquita de Al-Faruq) is a mosque in Vega Alta, Puerto Rico. It is the largest mosque on the island.

== Overview ==
The mosque was built in 1992 and opened as the second mosque on the island.

With a capacity of 1,200 male worshipers and 120 female worshipers, it is the largest mosque in Puerto Rico.

== See also ==
- Lists of mosques in North America
- Islam in Puerto Rico
