= Islam in Cuba =

Islam is a minority religion in the Cuba. According to a 2011 Pew Research Center report, there were then 6,000 Muslims in Cuba who constitute less than 0.1% of the population. As of 2016, most of the 10,000 Cuban Muslims were converts to the religion.

At a certain point, there were many Muslim students entering the nation of Cuba interested in studying at Cuba's prestigious schools. The number of students was approximately 1500–2000. That group included students of Pakistani origin, among others. It is known that the dominant population that went to study in Cuba was the Pakistani students, who were about 936 in strength. In 2001, Sheikh Muhammad bin Nassir Al-Aboudy, the Assistant Secretary-General of the Muslim World League (MWL), traveled to Cuba to obtain permission from the Cuban authorities to establish an Islamic organization that would support Cuba's Muslim community. Among the other aims of the proposed organization would be the construction of mosques and the dissemination of Islamic culture among Muslims.

As of July 2015, the Turkish Religious Affairs Foundation had opened the first prayer room for Cuban Muslims and the first mosque in Cuba was under construction with Turkish funding.

== History ==
Islam was largely introduced to Cuba during the colonial times (the late sixteenth century to the nineteenth century). This introduction, though, was not from colonists, but from Muslim Western African slaves who arrived in Cuba. Between 1808 and 1848, 49.4% (20,654) of the enslaved Muslim Africans who were captured and brought to the Americas arrived in Cuba, and many more who lack proper documentation have been suggested to have arrived.

The majority of these slaves were Mandingo from Senegambia or, as the British colonists called them, Mohammedanists. Many different groups of Africans arrived in Cuba in the nineteenth century and joined with the Mandingas because of a jihad in Western Africa. Little formal records exist on the impact of Islam on Cuba in the colonial times, but the Registry of the Court of Mixed Commission of Havana does confirm the Muslim African slaves' arrival in Cuba by documented records which included a unique number to each individual, sex, name, age, height, and from which the slaves came.

Also, evidence pointing to African origins of Islam in Cuba comes from the many Islamic names found by scholars, such as Henry Lovejoy, belonging to these slaves, such as Mohammed, Hausa, and Nupe. In 2011, Islam scholars also analyzed the different names found on the records from the Mixed Commission Courts of Havana to identify the names of Muslim and Arabic origin. It's been reported that there was more than 5,000 Muslims in Cuba before 1959 but most (around 80 percent) emigrated after the Cuban Revolution.

Cuban Muslims learned Islam through embassies of Middle Eastern countries as well as through students coming to study in Cuba from Muslim countries. Islam started to spread among Cubans in the 1970s and '80s. Printed and audio-visual Islamic resources are now almost nonexistent in Cuba. Spanish translation of the Quran and other major Islamic books are not available in the country. The Muslim community of Cuba even lacks educated religious cadres.

Islam became gained in popularity while the country endured an economic crisis, and would come to be more organized by the 1990s. Islam was not organized very well in the past because the main worshipers were slaves and they did not have the freedom to make Islam more organized in Cuba. Cuba's government also had problems with accepting Islam as an official religion at first. By the 1990s, the Cuban government was becoming more accepting of public practice. At first, Islam in Cuba was difficult to practice because of the lack of Islam books in Spanish—but with the completion of a mosque in Havana in 2015, it has become easier for people to worship. A lot has changed from the time when Muslims in Cuba could have faced consequences because of the government to having their own mosque with teachers. The change for some Muslim Cubans are difficult because they have always eaten pork and used alcohol. The change for many will be gradual because of lack of formal teaching and imams in the past. Since the Cuban Muslim community is still young many of the Cuban traditions have blended with the new Muslim traditions. With new teachers and a public place to worship more Cubans will be exposed to Islam and the religion will grow.

== Mosque ==
Cuba houses a mosque named Abdallah Mosque in Old Havana open to everyone for all daily prayers. Elsewhere, Cuba's Muslims usually pray in their homes. Former President Fidel Castro was reported to have promised to build a mosque for his country's Muslims, according to members of the Humanitarian Aid Foundation (IHH) who visited Cuba. In the past, the only prayers performed in public were the Friday Prayers that were conducted in a place known as Casa de los Árabes ("The Arab House") in old Havana. The Arab House belonged to a wealthy Arab immigrant who lived in Cuba during the 1940s, and it was built on Andalusian architectural designs. The House encompasses an Arab museum and restaurant. Qatar donated US$40,000 for the remodeling of the House, but it was only opened for Friday prayers.

== Religious Groups ==
Islam in Cuba is represented by several organizations that cater to the needs of the Muslim community. The Cuban Islamic Union (Unión Islámica de Cuba) is one of the main religious bodies, led by Imam Yahya Pedro, and focuses on religious education, community events, and facilitating Islamic practices in the country. Another significant organization is the Cuban Association for the Diffusion of Islam (Asociación Cubana para la Difusión del Islam), which is headed by Abu Duyanah and is dedicated to spreading awareness about Islam among Cuban converts and fostering connections with the global Muslim community.

Apart from these organizations, a notable Sunni Muslim community gathers at the Malcolm X Center in Havana, located in the home of Hassan Abdul Gafur. Gafur is credited with founding the first Islamic organization in Cuba in 1994, providing a space for Muslims to worship and learn about their faith. This center has played a crucial role in the growth of Islam in the country. Additionally, the Islamic League of Cuba is recognized as the only officially registered Muslim organization in the country, helping to coordinate religious activities with the Cuban government.

Additionally, a cultural organization, the Arab Union of Cuba—formed through the merger of several Arab associations—is closely linked to the heritage of many Muslim Cubans. It helps preserve Arabic language and cultural practices, which overlap with the religious identity of many members of the community.

== Notable Muslims ==
- Juan Carlos Gómez - Professional boxer and former Cruiserweight Champion.

== See also ==
- Religion in Cuba
- Latin American Muslims
- Arab Cubans
- Latino Muslims
