= Río Piedras Mosque =

Mosque in Río Piedras, San Juan, Puerto Rico

- Mezquita de Río Piedras
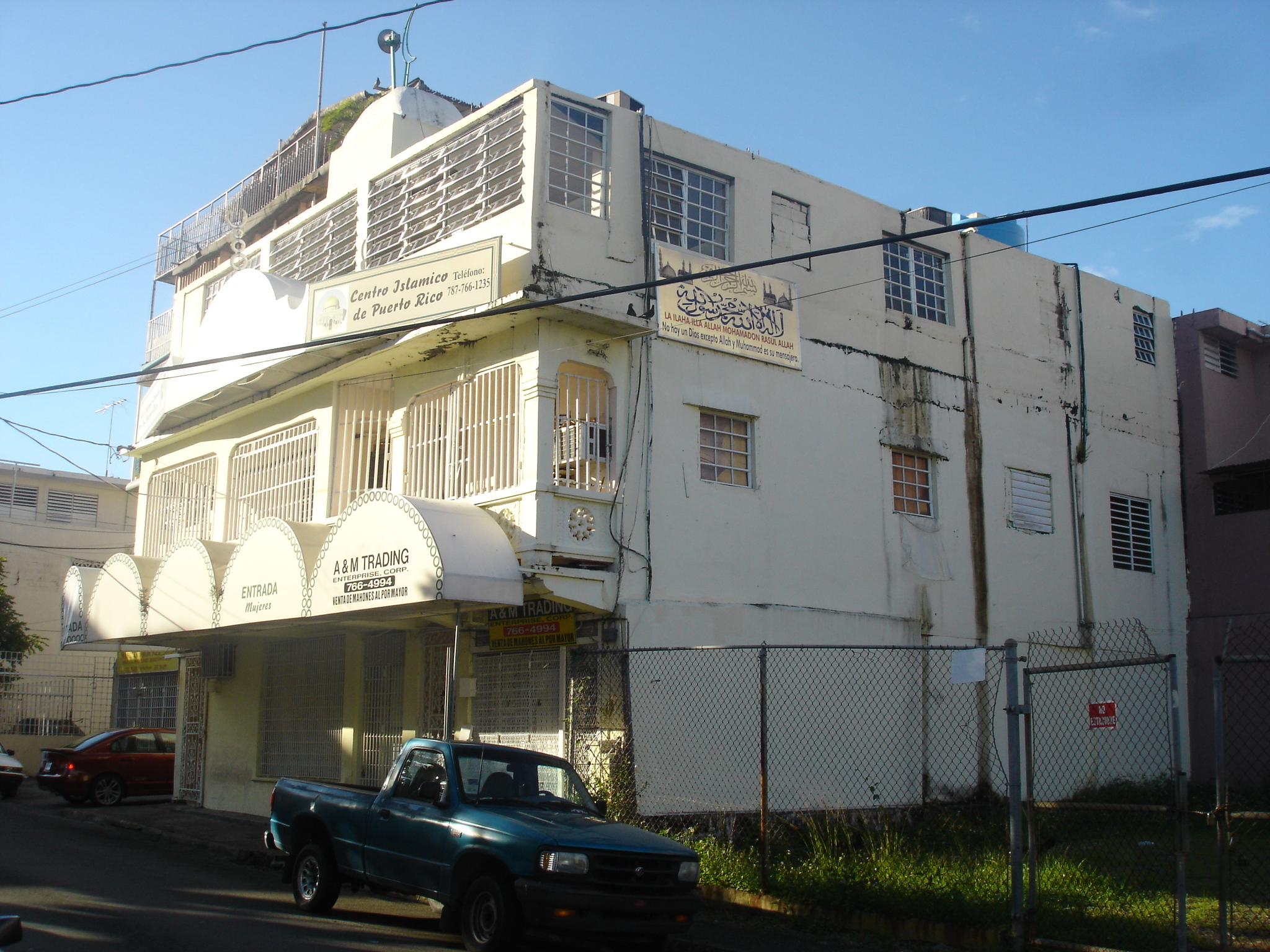

- Location of the mosque in Puerto Rico

Religion
- Affiliation: Islam
- Ecclesiastical or organizational status: Mosque
- Status: Active

Location
- Location: Río Piedras, San Juan
- Country: Puerto Rico
- Interactive map of Río Piedras Mosque
- Coordinates: 18°23′57.3″N 66°02′42.1″W

Architecture
- Type: Mosque
- Completed: 1981

Specifications
- Capacity: 240 worshipers
- Dome: 1

The Río Piedras Mosque (Spanish: Mezquita de Río Piedras), also known as the Puerto Rico Islamic Center (Spanish: Centro Islámico de Puerto Rico), is a mosque in Río Piedras, San Juan, Puerto Rico.

== Overview ==
In 1981, a building was purchased and converted into the Río Piedras Mosque. It became the first mosque in Puerto Rico.

The mosque has a capacity of 200 male worshipers and 40 female worshipers.

== See also ==
- Lists of mosques in North America
- Islam in Puerto Rico
