= Governor Machado =

Governor Machado may refer to:

- Juan Francisco Machado (fl. 1770s-80s), Governor of the Spanish Colony Trinidad from 1781 to 1784
- Joaquim José Machado (1847–1925), Governor of the Province of Mozambique from 1890 to 1891 and 110th Governor of Portuguese India from 1897 to 1900
