= Juan Francisco Machado =

Spanish governor of Trinidad

Juan Francisco Machado was the governor of the then Spanish colony Trinidad from 1781 to 1784.

In the late 18th century Trinidad was subordinated administratively to the intendant of Caracas. Machado's predecessor, military governor Rafael Delgado, had been dismissed for incompetence by intendant José de Abalos after a political affair. On March 31, 1781, Machado was appointed as Delgados successor. Delgado's mandate was affected by constant quarrelling with civil governor Martin de Salaverría about competences. This condition continued seamlessly during Machado's short term. In October 1783 the term of civil governor de Salaverría ended, and the Spanish government appointed José María Chacón as his successor. Chacón was supposed to be the first governor since 1779 to be civil and military governor in unison. Since Chacón had to travel to Trinidad first and didn't arrive until August 1784, Machado was appointed civil governor as well on October 18, 1783. In January 1784 (June 1784 according to a different source) Machado was dismissed by then acting intendant Francisco Saavedra de Sangronis, and Antonio Barreto was appointed governor of Trinidad until Chacón's arrival. Machado protested unavailingly against his dismissal.

Preceded by Rafael Delgado	Governor of Trinidad; 1781 - 1784	Succeeded by Antonio Barreto
