= List of governors of Trinidad =

Flag of the governor of Trinidad (1875–1889).

This article lists governors of Trinidad.

== Spanish governors (1506–1797) ==
- Diego Colón – 1506 – 1526
- Rodrigo de Bastidas – 1520
- Don Antonio Sedeño – July 12, 1530 – 1538
- Don Juan Ponce de León II 1571 – 1591
- Antonio de Berrío 1580 – 1597
- Fernando de Berrío 1597 – 1612
- Don Diego Palomeque de Acuña 1615 – 1618
- Fernando de Berrío 1619 – 1622
- Don Luis de Monsalves 1624 – 1631
- Cristóval de Aranda 1631 – 1636
- Diego López de Escobar 1636 – 1641
- Don Martín de Mendoza y Berrío 1642 – 1657
- Juan de Viedma 1657 – 1664
- José de Aspe y Zuñiga 1665 – 1668
- Diego Ximenes de Aldana 1670 – 1677
- Tiburcio de Aspe y Zúñiga 1678 – 1682
- Diego Suárez Ponce de León 1682 – 1688
- Sebastian de Roseta 1688 – 1690
- Francisco de Ménez 1692 – 1698
- José de León Echales 1699
- Francisco Ruíz de Aguirre 1700 – 1705
- Felipe de Artineda 1705 – 1711
- Cristóbal Félix de Guzmán 1711 – 1716
- Pedro de Yarza 1716 – 1721
- Juan de Orvay (acting) 1721
- Martín Pérez de Anda y Salazar 1721 – 1726
- Agustín de Arredonda 1726 – 1731
- Bartholomé de Aldunate y Rada 1731 – 1732
- Estevan Simón de Linán y Vera 1734 – 1746
- Juan José Salcedo 1746 – 1752
- Francisco Nanclares 1752 – 1757
- Pedro de La Moneda 1757 – 1760
- Jacinto San Juan 1760 – 1762
- José Antonio Gil 1762 – 1766
- José de Flores 1766 – 1773
- Juan de Dios Valdés y Yarza 1773 – 1776
- Don Manuel Falques 1776 – 1779 – Military Governor
- Martin de Salaverría 1779 – 1783 – Civil Governor
- Juan Francisco Machado 1781 – 1784
- José María Chacón 1784 – 1797

== British governors (1797–1889) ==
- Sir Ralph Abercromby – 18 February 1797 – February 1797
- Thomas Picton Feb 1797 – Feb 1803 (military governor to 1801)
- Commission (William Fullarton, Samuel Hood, Thomas Picton) – February 1803 – July 1804
- Sir Thomas Hislop – July 1804 – 27 September 1811
- Hector William Munro – 27 September 1811 – 14 June 1813
- Sir Ralph Woodford – 14 June 1813 – January 1828
- Henry Capadose (acting) – January 1828 – April 1828
- Charles Felix Smith – April 1828 – 10 March 1829
- Lewis Grant – 10 March 1829 – 22 April 1833
- Sir George Hill – 22 April 1833 – 9 March 1839
- John Alexander Mein (acting) – 9 March 1839 – April 1840
- Henry George Macleod – April 1840 – 1846
- George Francis Robert Harris, 3rd Baron Harris – 1846 – 1854
- Legendre Charles Bourchier (acting) – 1854
- Sir Charles Elliot – 10 March 1854 – 1856
- B. Brooks (acting) – 1856 – 1857
- Robert William Keate – 26 January 1857 – 1864
- ? Thompson (acting) -1864
- Sir John Henry Thomas Manners-Sutton – 6 September 1864 – 1866
- Edward Everard Rushworth (acting) – 1866
- Sir Arthur Charles Hamilton-Gordon – 7 November 1866 – 1870
- James Robert Longden – 25 June 1870 – 1874
- William Wellington Cairns – 2 May 1874 – 1874
- John Scott Bushe (1st time) (acting) – 1874
- Henry Turner Irving (1st time) – 20 November 1874 – 1876
- John Scott Bushe (2nd time) (acting) – 1876 – 1877
- William Des Vœux (acting) – 1877 – 1878
- Henry Turner Irving (2nd time) – 1878 – 1880
- William Rowland Pyne (acting) – 1880
- William Alexander George Young (acting) – 1880
- Sir Sanford Freeling – 2 November 1880 – 1884
- John Scott Bushe (3rd time) (acting) – 1884
- Sir Frederick Palgrave Barlee (acting) – 19 June 1884 – 8 August 1884
- John Scott Bushe (4th time) (acting) – 1884 – 1885
- Sir Arthur Elibank Havelock – 24 January 1885 – 1885
- David Wilson (acting) 1885
- Sir William Robinson – 9 October 1885 – 1889 (continued as Governor of Trinidad and Tobago until 1891)

== See also ==
- List of governors of Tobago
- List of governors of Trinidad and Tobago
- List of governors-general of Trinidad and Tobago
- List of presidents of Trinidad and Tobago
- List of prime ministers of Trinidad and Tobago
