= Iere Village Mosque =

Mosque in Iere, Prince Town, Trinidad and Tobago

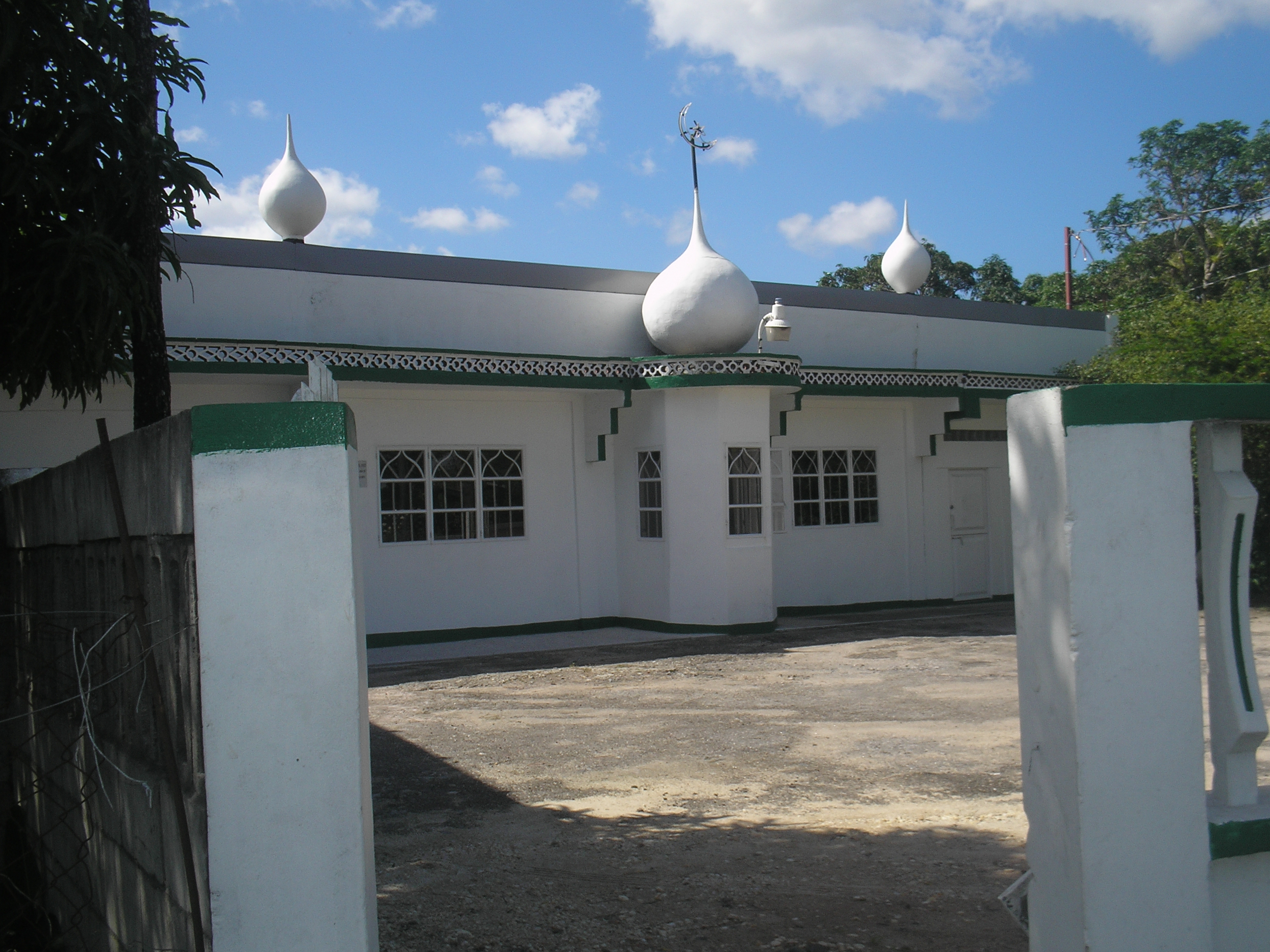

- Location within Trinidad and Tobago

Religion
- Affiliation: Islam

Location
- Location: Iere, Princes Town, Trinidad and Tobago
- Coordinates: 10°17′09.1″N 61°23′14.8″W

Architecture
- Type: mosque
- Established: 1868 (original building); 1968 (current building)
- Completed: 1968

The Iere Village Mosque is a mosque in Iere, Princes Town, Trinidad and Tobago.

== History ==
The mosque was originally built in 1868 by immigrants from British Raj who worked at the surrounding estate. In 1968, it was rebuilt to what it is today. Later the mosque was declared a historic building by the government.

== See also ==
- Lists of mosques in North America
- Islam in Trinidad and Tobago
