= Islam in Guatemala =

Guatemala is a predominantly Christian country, with Islam being a small minority religion. Due to secular nature of the Guatemala's constitution, Muslims are free to proselytize and build places of worship in the country.

According to US-Freedom Report 2023, There are approximately 2,000 Muslims of mostly Palestinian origin, who reside primarily in Guatemala City.

There is a mosque near the emblematic Reforma avenue, called the Islamic Da'wah Mosque of Guatemala (Spanish: Mezquita de Aldawaa Islámica) which is available for the five daily prayers and offers classes in Islamic studies.

The president of the Islamic Community of the country is Fahed Himeda el-Sagini.

The main Ahmadiyya mosque in the country is Mezquita Baitul Awwal, first constructed in 1989. However, the Community also has mosques in Huehuetenango and Quetzaltenango. There are about 700 Ahmadis in the country.

== Mosques ==
External image
- Al-Da'wa Islamic Mosque – Photo Gallery

The mosque known as Al-Da'wa Islamic Mosque (Mezquita de Aldawaa Islámica, مسجد الدعوة) is situated on Reforma Avenue in Zone 9 of Guatemala City, the nation’s capital, and has been functioning since 1996. Daily, the mosque facilitates five prayers and conducts lessons on Islam. The chairman of the committee overseeing community affairs is Jamal Mubarak. The mosque carries out its activities through an agreement with the Government of Guatemala. It is frequented by local Guatemalan Muslims who have embraced Islam, by Arabs, and by Muslim tourists. The post of imam is held by Omar Sanchez, a Guatemalan convert to Islam who later pursued his studies in Medina.

== See also ==
- Latin American Muslims
- Latino Muslims
