= Madina Mosque (Barbados) =

Mosque in Bridgetown, Barbados

- Location of the mosque in Barbados

Religion
- Affiliation: Islam
- Ecclesiastical or organisational status: Mosque
- Status: Active

Location
- Location: Bridgetown, Barbados
- Interactive map of Madina Mosque
- Coordinates: 13°06′05″N 59°36′58″W

Architecture
- Type: Mosque
- Established: February 1957
- Completed: 1957

The Madina Mosque is a mosque in Bridgetown, Barbados.

== History ==
The mosque was opened in February 1957. On 25 January 2020, the mosque was declared a historical building by Barbados National Trust.

== See also ==
- Lists of mosques in North America
- Islam in Barbados
