= Islam in Barbados =

Barbados is an overwhelmingly Christian majority country, with Islam being a minority religion. Due to secular nature of the country's constitution, Muslims are free to proselytize and build places of worship in the country. Statistics for Islam in Barbados estimate a Muslim population of over 4000, most of whom are immigrants or descendants of immigrants from the Indian state of Gujarat. A few immigrants from Guyana, Trinidad, South Asia, and the Middle East, as well as about 200 native-born persons, constitute the rest of the growing Muslim community, representing 1.50 percent of the population Close to 90 percent of all Barbadians (also known colloquially as Bajan) are of African descent (Afro-Bajans), mostly descendants of the slave labourers on the sugar plantations. The remainder of the population includes groups of Europeans (Euro-Bajans), Asians, Bajan Hindus and Muslims, and an influential Middle Eastern (Arab-Bajans) group mainly of Syrian and Lebanese descent.

There are four mosques, an Islamic Academy, an Islamic institute, one Muslim school and various other Islamic organisations. To name them, The Islamic Academy of Barbados, Darul Imaan Institute, The Barbados Muslim Association, The Islamic Teaching Center, The Institute of Islamic Propagation and Thought, The Medinah Foundation and The Al-Falah Muslim School. Mosques include the Jama Mosque, Madina Mosque, Makki Masjid and Masjid An-Noor.

== Mosques ==
Four mosques have fixed times for daily five times prayers along with weekly lecture programs on Qur'an and Hadith. These masajid also have Islamic classes which teach Qur'an and Sunnah to children from four years of age.

== Islamic organisations in Barbados ==
=== Islamic Academy of Barbados ===
IAB is an organisation established in 1998 under the patronage of the esteem Shaykh Muhammad Saleem Dhorat hafizahullah to engender a greater understanding of Islam in young and old alike, amongst Muslims and interested Non-Muslims. To achieve this aim the IAB produces leaflets on various Islamic aspects along with contemporary issues facing the Muslims of today, quarterly Journal Sa'wtus Saahil, weekly broadcast of lecture, Monthly Programme for children from age of 10 & over, Youth programme for youth over 16, Annual Da'wah Conference, Annual Sister Conference, meetings with interested Non-Muslims, Islamic educational classes, religious counseling and fatawaa section (for Islamic jurisprudent guidance).

=== The Barbados Muslim Association ===
BMA is an umbrella organization for masjids & musallah on the island, which also advocates on behalf of Muslims at the national level.

=== The Islamic Teaching Center ===
The Islamic Teaching Center based in Harts Gap, Christ Church conduct salaah and various other programmes and events.

=== The Institute of Islamic Propagation and Thought ===
The Institute of Islamic Propagation and Thought supplies and distributes Islamic literature free of charge to all Islamic organizations.

=== The Medinah Foundation ===
The Medinah Foundation is a charitable organisation aimed at helping the poor and needy and building healthy community relations with others.

=== The Al-Falah Muslim School ===
The Al-Falah Muslim School, a primary and secondary school established to foster the Muslim youths with Islamic values.

The cultural centre of the Islamic community of Barbados is to the west of the city centre of Bridgetown. Near to Kensington in Saint Michael. New communities established over the past few years around Belleville and Wanstead areas as well.

=== Concerned for the Future - Barbados ===
Not an official organisation in the traditional sense. It was founded by a group of youngsters in conjunction with a few local scholars in December 2016.

As the name suggests, the sole purpose is a concern for Islam in Barbados, and to facilitate and make aware of opportunities for Islamic learning through various means such as hosting programs in their local masjids, promoting events/programs being organised (by others) in their community or through the online/social media sphere.

=== Street Dawah Barbados ===
Also not an official organisation in the traditional sense and founded by the same youngsters involved with Concerned for the Future - Barbados, though founded much earlier back in January 2014.

Its aim is to propagate the Islamic message to the local non-Muslim population in Barbados not necessarily in a bid to convince them but more to convey to them what beliefs Muslims actually hold. The concern was that even after 100 years plus of Muslim presence in Barbados (excluding West African Muslim presence on the island from the years of the Transatlantic Slave Trade), Islam as a religion is still severely misunderstood in the island.

== See also ==
- List of grand mosques
- Demographics of Barbados
- Organisation of Islamic Cooperation

== Sources ==
- K. F. Bin Mohd Noor. Muslims Statistics. 2000 Barrett. World Christian Encyclopedia, 1982
- Syed, Natasha (2022-12-18). "Barbados: The Perfect Caribbean Island For Muslim Tourists - British Muslim Magazine". www.britishmuslim-magazine.com.
- Degia, Haajima (2018-07-03). "Bajan-Indians: emergent identities of the Gujarati-Muslims of Barbados". South Asian Diaspora. 10 (2): 155–171. doi:10.1080/19438192.2018.1460919. ISSN 1943-8192.
- The Barbados Museum & Historical Society (2021-06-18). Islam in Barbados – via YouTube.
- Chitwood, Ken (2023-06-21), "Islam in the Caribbean", Oxford Research Encyclopedia of Religion, Oxford University Press, doi:10.1093/acrefore/9780199340378.013.1051, ISBN 978-0-19-934037-8
- Bryan, Bethany; Elias, Marie Louise; Elias, Josie (2019-04-15). Barbados. Cavendish Square Publishing, LLC. p. 86. ISBN 978-1-5026-4731-3.
- Islam and Muslims in the American Continent. Center of Historical, Economical and Social Studies. 2001. pp. 254–262.
- Nakhuda, Sabir (2013). Bengal to Barbados: A 100 Year History of East Indians in Barbados. The Author. ISBN 978-976-8233-71-4.
- Antillean Media Group (2014-09-24). "How Barbadian media turned on its Muslim community". Antillean Media Group.
- Today, Barbados (2014-10-30). "BARBADOS MUSLIMS "DO NOT FEAR US"! - Caribbean Muslims".
- "History of Islam in Barbados (Part 1)". Ammar ibn Aziz Ahmed. 2019-03-16.
- "History of Islam in Barbados (Part 2)". Ammar ibn Aziz Ahmed. 2019-03-23.
