= Islam in El Salvador =

El Salvador is a predominantly Christian country, with adherents Islam being a minuscule minority. Due to the secular nature of the country's constitution, Muslims are free to proselytize and build mosques in the country.

There is a small Muslim community in El Salvador, largely consisting of Yemeni Arabs. However, most of the Palestinian Arab population in the country is Christian. It is estimated that there are about 1,000-1,500 Muslims in El Salvador, however, the figure can reach up to 18,000.

There is an Islamic Cultural Association operated by the Shia community, named Fatimah Az-Zahra. They published the first Islamic magazine in Central America: Revista Biblioteca Islámica. Additionally, they are credited with providing the first and only Islamic library dedicated to spreading Islamic culture in the country. Ahmadiyya Muslim Community also exists in the country.

== Background ==
=== 20th-century immigration ===
The arrival of families emigrating from Arab countries (Syria, Lebanon and Palestine) primarily occurred during the early 20th century. However, the majority of these Middle Eastern immigrants were Christian - of the few Muslim families, little or nothing had been documented.

== Centers ==
In 1994, the first center of Islamic worship was inaugurated in El Salvador, named Centro Islámico Árabe Salvadoreño, founded in the capital city of San Salvador by a group of Salvadoran nationals and individuals of Palestinian ancestry. In 2004, a second mosque was inaugurated in the capital by Shiites, they named it Fátimah Az-Zahra, in honor of Fatimah, the daughter of the Islamic prophet Muhammad from his first wife Khadija. They began diffusing Islamic literature through the Internet, inaugurating the country's first Islamic Website that includes the publication of a quarterly magazine and that currently counts more than 100 digitized Islamic books. In 2007, a third mosque, called the Dar-Ibrahim Mosque, was inaugurated in San Salvador.

The Islamic Centers are generally involved in performing the Friday congregational prayers known as Salaat-al-Jummah, distributing literature, charitable activities, online propagation, and donating informative materials on Islam to various religious and cultural institutions nationwide. For example, the Fátimah Az-Zahra Islamic Center provides introductory classes on Islamic doctrine and history. These classes, which are open to the general public, are not solely religious in nature: courses in foreign languages and efforts to improve adult literacy are also offered.

== Mosques ==
According to "Fast base" there are 14 Mosques in El Salvador:

- Dar-Ibrahim Mosque
- Ismael El-Salvador Mosque
- Fatima al-Zahra Islamic Center

== See also ==
- Latin American Muslims
- Islam by country
- Latino Muslims
