= Antonio de Berrio =

Spanish colonial governor

Antonio de Berrío (1527–1597) was a Spanish soldier, governor and explorer in Colonial America.

== Biography ==
Antonio de Berrío was born in Segovia. He began his military career at the age of 14 in the service of the king Carlos I. The young nobleman began his military life in Flanders. He entered combat for the first time in the Battle of Marciano that ended with the capture of Siena. Later he was destined to the fight in the African coasts against the Berbers. The next destination was the fight against the Rebellion of the Alpujarras against the rebellious Moriscos. After the conflict in the mountains of Granada, was already appointed as captain of a cavalry company to the surveillance of the coasts of Granada, to finally be appointed governor of the Alpujarras.

Already as governor Berrío marries María de Oruña, maternal niece of adelantado and lawyer Gonzalo Jiménez de Quesada. The latter, who died in 1579, in his will appoints Berrio and his wife as successors and heirs of their titles and assets. They receive the news by the Correo de las Indias in 1580, Berrío is 53 years old and his life, which seemed to take a calmer course, returns to action.

Upon his arrival in America, and as governor of Trinidad in 1580–1597, title inherited from his political uncle, the adelantado Gonzalo Jiménez de Quesada, founder of Bogotá and one of the main characters among the conquistadores of New Granada, will continue with the work begun by him Antonio de Berrio organized several expeditions to Guiana Plateau in his search for the mythical El Dorado. Between 1583 and 1589 he carried out his first two expeditions, penetrating the hostile and wild regions of the Colombian plains and the Upper Orinoco.

== First expedition ==
The expedition first took place on January 1, 1584. It counted 80 conquistadores and its route crossed Meta River and Tomo River to reach the Orinoco River and the foothills of the Guiana Shield. There he was stopped by rainy season, however, he learned about the existence of the city-state Manõa, a legendary city of gold also known as El Dorado. After examining the west coast, he returned to Bogotá in 1585. After this expedition, he moved to the estuary of the Orinoco River, where he founded the city of Sao Thome de Guyana, and Trinidad's city San José de Oruña.

== Second expedition ==
In 1587 he went on a second expedition, lasting over two years. During this time, he investigated the western cliffs of the Guiana Plateau.

== Third expedition ==
In 1590 he began his third expedition, managing to sail the Orinoco downstream until reaching the Caroní, that is when Berrío believed he had found the step he was looking for on his way to El Dorado, but in order to continue with the expedition he needed men and food, therefore part towards the Margarita Island in March 1591, before building the Santo Tomé de Guayana fortress, founding site of the current Ciudad Guayana, two exact leagues from the right bank of the Caroní River and take possession of the latter in the name of the king Philip II. Upon his arrival in Margarita, passing through Trinidad Island, which he considered a future good base for the following explorations, he was informed of the death of his wife. In 1595 Berrío is 68 years old, has spent his formidable heritage on expeditions, neither the governor of Margarita Province nor that of Caracas wanted to help him with new adventures, so he resorts to the crown. Berrio waits anxiously in Trinidad for the arrival of 300 men and the food and money requested to continue his search for El Dorado.

== Fourth expedition. Prisoner of Walter Raleigh. ==
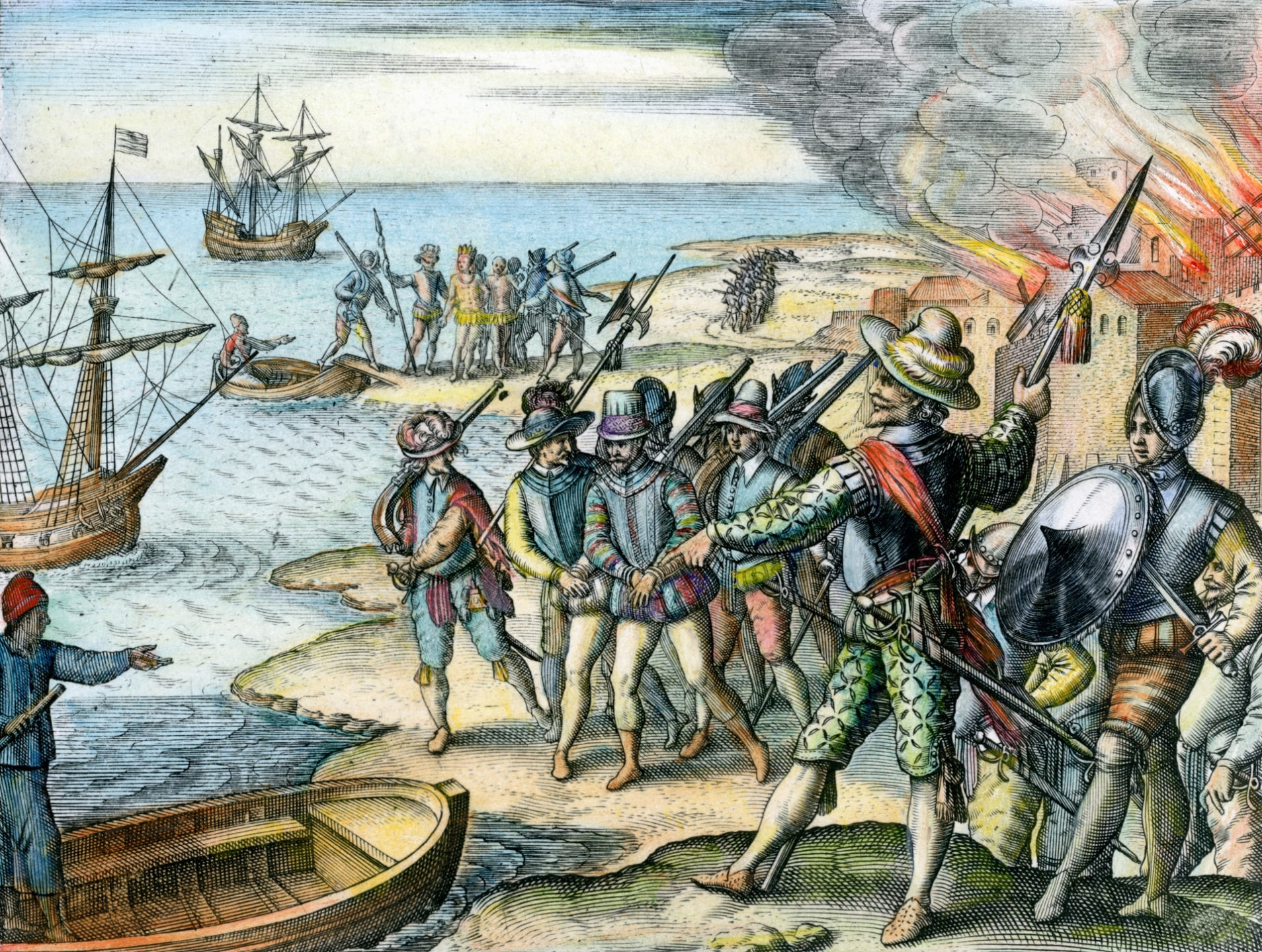
Antonio de Berrio captured by Walter Raleigh

In April 1595 two ships arrived at Margarita island, but they were not the requested reinforcements, they were two English ships under the command of Walter Raleigh, known by the Spaniards as Guaterral. Spain and England were not at war, but relations were tense. Raleigh was also searching for El Dorado, even having studied Spanish to be able to personally read the chronicles that were published in America about America. Raleigh presented himself with a delegation for friendly purposes, and at the first opportunity assaulted the city of San José de Oruña, founded by the lieutenant and commissioner of Berrio, Domingo de Vera. The square defended by 28 soldiers was taken, and Berrio and his lieutenant, Alvaro Jorge, were taken as hostages, after which Raleigh burned down the city. His next act was to try to locate El Dorado going up the Orinoco, with Berrio as a guide. Berrio took them through the territories already explored by him years ago. The expedition of Raleigh unsuccessfully returns to Trinidad and the liberation of Antonio de Berrio took place at the end of June 1595 in the coasts of Cumana, in a prisoners exchange deal.

== Death and legacy ==
Antonio de Berrio died at age 70 in Santo Tomé de Guayana, fortress founded by himself, in 1597, a few days after his son Fernando de Berrío arrived with the reinforcements of troops, food and money he requested to continue with the search for the mythical El Dorado. El Dorado fever also severely affected his son, who would actively continue his search. As for Raleigh, he wrote a famous book of his days, entitled "Discovery of the great, rich and beautiful empire of Guayana" chronicle of his expedition with Berrio. Raleigh was only able to contribute the book, no gold, which earned him a death sentence by James I, successor of the deceased Elizabeth I, but execution was put on hold for an indefinite prison in the Tower of London. After twelve years of captivity, Raleigh regained his freedom, all this time did not serve to forget El Dorado, fever led him to make another expedition in his search that ended in failure and also broke the pact not to damage the Spanish possessions in the new world product of the new policy of alliance of England with Spain, which cost him his head at the hands of an executioner to satisfy the Spanish monarch Philip III on October 29, 1618.
