= Abdallah Mosque =

Mosque in Havana, La Habana, Cuba

- Mezquita Abdallah
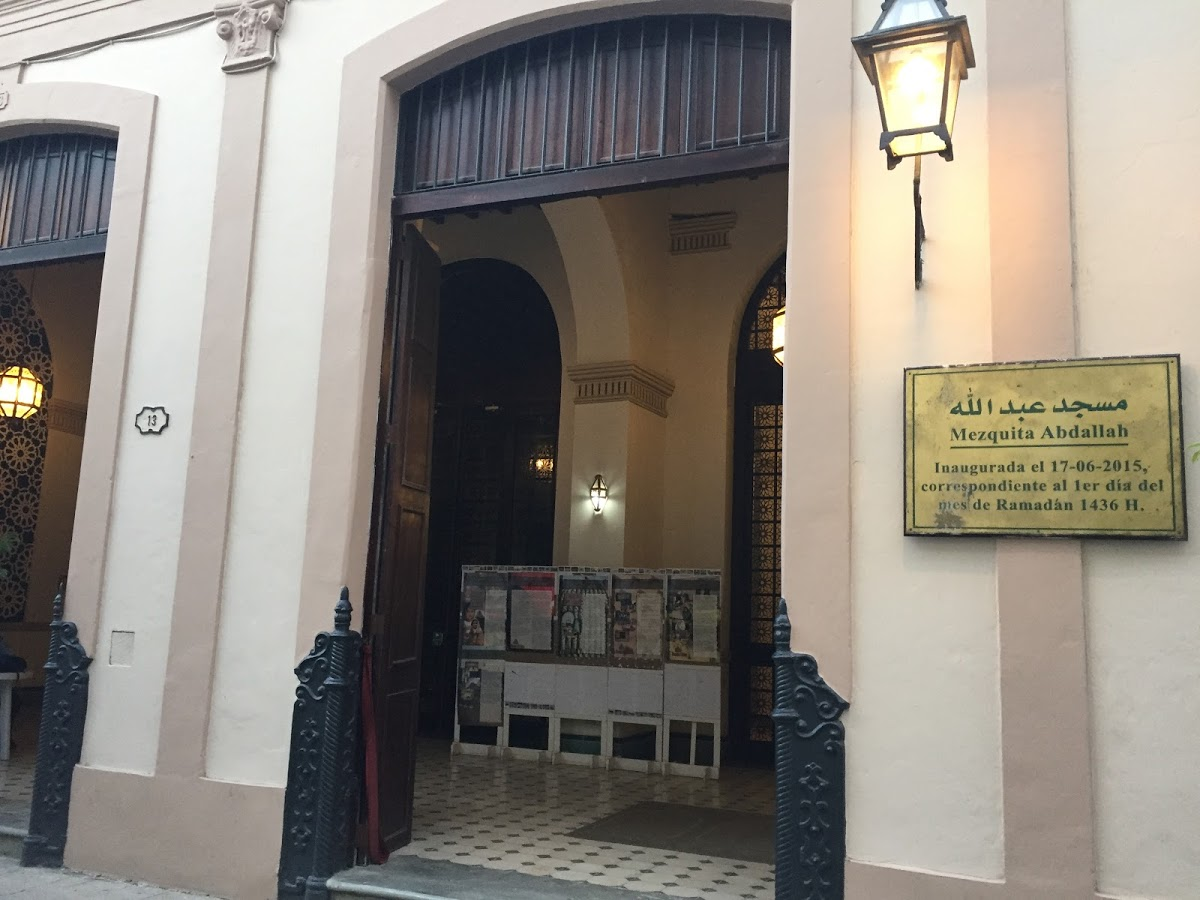

- Location of the mosque in Cuba

Religion
- Affiliation: Islam
- Ecclesiastical or organizational status: Mosque
- Status: Active

Location
- Location: Havana, La Habana
- Country: Cuba
- Interactive map of Abdallah Mosque
- Coordinates: 23.13933°N 82.34925°W

Architecture
- Type: Mosque
- Completed: 2015

The Abdallah Mosque (Spanish: Mezquita Abdallah) is a mosque in Havana, La Habana Province, Cuba.

== Overview ==
The current mosque building was originally an antique automobile museum. It was subsequently converted into a mosque and opened to the public in 2015, following government approval in June of that year.

The mosque is a one-story building in a shape of colonial-style box, with its interior wall decorated with Arabic calligraphy.

== See also ==
- Lists of mosques in North America
- Islam in Cuba
