= Al-Noor Mosque (Santo Domingo) =

Mosque in Santo Domingo, National, Dominican Republic

- Mezquita Al-Noor
- Location of the mosque in the Dominican Republic

Religion
- Affiliation: Sunni Islam
- Ecclesiastical or organizational status: Mosque
- Status: Active

Location
- Location: Santo Domingo, National District
- Country: Dominican Republic
- Interactive map of Al-Noor Mosque
- Administration: Islamic Circle of the Dominican Republic
- Coordinates: 18°28′32.6″N 69°54′13.5″W

Architecture
- Type: Mosque

The Al-Noor Mosque (Spanish: Mezquita Al-Noor) is a mosque in Santo Domingo, National District, in the Dominican Republic.

== Overview ==
The mosque was originally a house building which was purchased by the Islamic Circle of the Dominican Republic (Spanish: Círculo Islámico de República Dominicana) for the amount of DOP 2.85 million. The building was then converted into the first mosque in the country.

The mosque building complex also features a pharmacy located behind the mosque building.

== See also ==
- Lists of mosques in North America
- Islam in the Dominican Republic
