= Al Fatiha Mosque =

Mosque in Port-au-Prince, Ouest, Haiti

- Location of the mosque in Haiti

Religion
- Affiliation: Islam
- Ecclesiastical or organizational status: Mosque
- Status: Active

Location
- Location: Port-au-Prince, Ouest
- Country: Haiti
- Interactive map of Al Fatiha Mosque
- Coordinates: 18°33′17.0″N 72°19′42.1″W

Architecture
- Type: Mosque
- Completed: 2004

The Al Fatiha Mosque is a mosque in Port-au-Prince, Ouest Department, Haiti.

== History ==
The space where the mosque stands today was purchased in 1993. Until 1995, the mosque was a single prayer room without a formal name. In 1995 Abdul Ali had donated his half land of his house for construction of a proper mosque. The mosque map was designed by Muhammad Ameer of Pakistan and major portion of fund was also donated by him.

In 2010, the mosque was damaged by the 2010 Haiti earthquake. Later, the mosque was completely renovated and restored.

== See also ==
- Lists of mosques in North America
- Islam in Haiti
