= Kemuel Delgado =

Puerto Rican activist (born 1998)

Kemuel Delgado Soto
- Born: March 28, 1998 (age 28)
- Organizations: March For Our Lives; Junte Estadista de Puerto Rico; Young Democrats of America
- Known for: Pro-statehood activism
- Political party: New Progressive Party (2012-2017); Movimiento Victoria Ciudadana (2019-2020); Democratic Party
- Movement: Statehood

Kemuel Delgado Soto is a Puerto Rican activist who served as the Electoral Commissioner of Hatillo's Precinct 029. He was the first Muslim to occupy said position in Puerto Rico.

== Early years ==
Kemuel Delgado Soto was born on March 28, 1998, to parents from Hatillo, Puerto Rico. He attended Father Aníbal Reyes Belén High School in his native Hatillo. There, he was one of 30 winners of the 15th Edition of the 21st Century Young Architect Contest, hosted by the Department of Education. Between March and July 2018, he worked as an administrative assistant in Arecibo at the Municipal Office of Public Safety. Upon graduation from high school, he moved to Round Lake Beach, Illinois to study political sciences at College of Lake County. He was also secretary of the college's Philosophy Club and treasurer for the Muslim Student Association. Afterwards, Delgado Soto transferred to Carthage College in Kenosha, Wisconsin, where he continued his studies in political sciences, and founded and was president of Carthage's Muslim Student Association in 2019; however, he moved back to Puerto Rico before completing his degree.

== Political involvement ==
Upon seeing the government's response after Hurricane María, he decided to abandon the party in 2017, but became a statehood advocate. During the 2020 presidential election, he "believe[d] that [Donald] Trump's attempt[ed] to paint his Democratic opponent as a socialist [which] could [have] prove[n] effective in turning Puerto Rican voters against [Joe] Biden." Notwithstanding he was "hopeful that the election of a Democratic president will bring a resolution of Puerto Rico's statehood question."

Upon the formation of the Movimiento Victoria Ciudadana in 2019, Delgado Soto became the spokesperson for statehooders (Note: Members of the Statehood movement in Puerto Rico or in the United States of America.) in the Coordinating Committee of Network of Networks Organization and the General Coordinator of the Autonomous Network of Statehooders of the MVC. Even though MVC is mostly composed of pro-independence supporters, it labelled itself as having a "[focus] on promoting equality, education and labour reforms, tackling corruption, and the decolonisation of Puerto Rico." Additionally, was the Electoral Commissioner for Hatillo's Precinct 029 during the 2020 general election, having to supervise eight voting centers.

On November 28, 2020, Delgado Soto announced his resignation from his positions in MVC and the party overall through his social media accounts due to "inclusion issues" in MVC. Delgado Soto recognized that MVC "[had] done a tremendous job and [had] written a new chapter for history." However "the attorney Lúgaro and Rivera-Lassén, also Nogales; were one of the few people who were neutral and respected their Statehooder colleagues" and that the other high-profile statehood-supporting figure, the former MVC candidate for Resident Commissioner, Dr. Zayira Jordán Conde, "was attacked for campaigning for Yes [to Statehood]." At the end of his public declarations, Delgado Soto finished by stating to "remember who the real enemy is and that is not me, nor the Statehooders." On December 7 Delgado Soto appeared with Dr. Jordán Conde on WAPA-TV's Decisión 2020 (2020 Decision) program to discuss the motive of both their exits from MVC.

At the end of November 2020, Delgado Soto founded and became the State Director for the March for Our Lives chapter in Puerto Rico. Furthermore, he is the founder and lead organizer of the Junte Estadista de Puerto Rico, a pro-statehood non-partisan organization. Delgado Soto resides in Connecticut where he is a Connecticut National Committee Representative and Vice Chair of the Muslim Caucus of Young Democrats of America.
