= Omar bin Al-Khattab Mosque =

Mosque in Willemstad, Curaçao

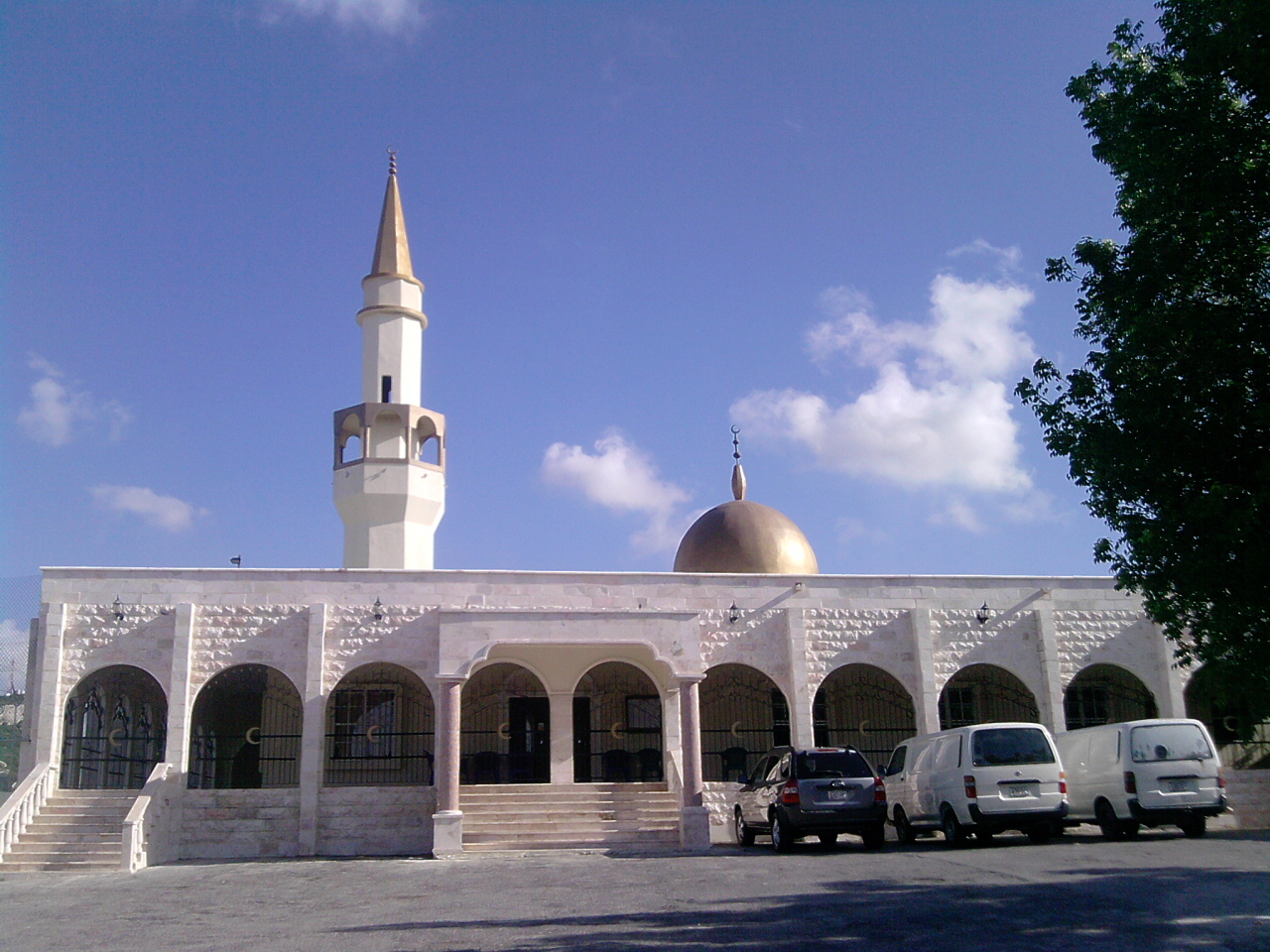

- The mosque in Curaçao

Religion
- Affiliation: Islam
- Ecclesiastical or organizational status: Mosque
- Status: Active

Location
- Location: Otrobanda, Willemstad, Curaçao
- Country: Kingdom of the Netherlands
- Interactive map of Omar bin Al-Khattab Mosque
- Coordinates: 12°06′56″N 68°56′57″W

Architecture
- Type: Mosque
- Groundbreaking: 1963
- Completed: 1966

Specifications
- Capacity: 200 worshippers
- Dome: 1
- Minaret: 1
- Minaret height: 18 m (59 ft)

The Omar bin Al-Khattab Mosque or Curaçao Islamic Center is a mosque in Willemstad, Curaçao, part of the Kingdom of the Netherlands.

== Overview ==
In 1963, construction started to transform the former estate of Plantersrust into a mosque. It was built without government support, but with donations from Muslims in Saudi Arabia, Libya and Trinidad and Tobago. Many of the Muslims in Curaçao are of Lebanese descent. In 1965, construction finished, and the mosque was officially opened on 1 May 1966 by governor Cola Debrot.

The mosque has a capacity of 200 worshippers. The minaret is 18 metres (59 ft) tall.

== See also ==
- Lists of mosques in North America
- Islam in the Netherlands Antilles
