= Dar-Ibrahim Mosque =

Mosque in San Salvador, El Salvador

- Mezquita Dar-Ibrahim
- Location of the mosque in El Salvador

Religion
- Affiliation: Islam
- Ecclesiastical or organizational status: Mosque
- Status: Active

Location
- Location: San Salvador
- Country: El Salvador
- Interactive map of Dar-Ibrahim Mosque
- Coordinates: 13°41′58.0″N 89°12′35.4″W

Architecture
- Type: Mosque
- Completed: 2007

The Dar-Ibrahim Mosque (Spanish: Mezquita Dar-Ibrahim) is a mosque in San Salvador, El Salvador.

== Overview ==
The mosque was constructed in 2007 and resembles the shape of a house, without a dome or minaret.

== See also ==
- Lists of mosques in North America
- Islam in El Salvador
