= Boukman Buhara Mosque =

Mosque in Nord-Est, Haiti

- Location of the mosque in Haiti

Religion
- Affiliation: Islam
- Ecclesiastical or organizational status: mosque
- Status: Active

Location
- Location: Nord-Est
- Country: Haiti
- Interactive map of Boukman Buhara Mosque
- Coordinates: 19°39′14″N 72°03′27″W

Architecture
- Type: Mosque
- Founder: Diyanet Foundation
- Groundbreaking: 2014
- Completed: 2016

Specifications
- Interior area: 160 m^{2} (1,700 sq ft)
- Minaret: 1

The Boukman Buhara Mosque is a mosque in Nord-Est Department, Haiti.

== Overview ==
The construction of the mosque started in 2014 and completed in 2016.

The mosque is the first one in the country built with a minaret. It has a total floor area of 160 square metres (1,700 sq ft).

== See also ==
- Lists of mosques in North America
- Islam in Haiti
