= Islam in Costa Rica =

Islam is one of the smallest minority faiths in Costa Rica, whose state religion is Catholic Christianity. Without an official number by any state entity, it is considered that the number of Muslims in Costa Rica could be between 1000 and 1500 people, mostly emigrants from Algeria, India, Iraq, Iran, Lebanon, Morocco, Egypt, Somalia, Pakistan, Palestine and Syria. This number includes Muslims who have immigrated to Costa Rican territory as well as those Costa Ricans who have embraced the Islamic faith through conversion, whose number is estimated to be at around 100. The number of Muslims corresponding to the Sunni and Shia factions is also unknown, although it is generally considered that the Sunnis are the majority.

== History ==
The first migrations of Arabs to Costa Rica date back to the beginning of the 20th|century and were mostly Lebanese. Some of these immigrants carried the family names Ayales, Salom, Yamuni and Beirute. Second and third generation members of these families who emigrated to Costa Rica have held important positions within the Public Administration in different governments as well as in companies that were founded during the second half of the 20th century. 20thcentury and are still part of the market. Some of these families come from eastern branches of Christianity (Maronite Church) and currently profess the Catholic religion. Later migrations of Arab settlers arose in the mid-20thcentury, in many cases by refugees fleeing various armed conflicts that afflicted the Middle East and North Africa mainly Lebanese and Palestinians. One of the first Muslim residents of the country was the Palestinian doctor Abdul Sasa who remembers that in 1976 there were only four Muslims in all of Costa Rica.

Costa Rican foreign policy has been particularly close to the interests of the State of Israel, with the Republic of Costa Rica being one of the nations that voted for that nation's acceptance as a member of the United Nations in 1947, and also witnessing a high immigration of Jews from Poland to the country during pre-war and post-war times. Until 2007, Costa Rica and El Salvador were the only countries that maintained their diplomatic headquarters in the city of Jerusalem. During the administration of Óscar Arias Sánchez, the Costa Rican embassy was relocated from Jerusalem to Tel Aviv. Subsequently, a diplomatic rapprochement was made with the State of Palestine, specifically with the representation of the Palestinian National Authority to the United Nations in New York City. Riyad Mansour was appointed ambassador plenipotentiary to Costa Rica, however, there is currently no embassy of the State of Palestine in Costa Rica and Riyad Mansour continues to serve as ambassador to the United Nations.

== Mosques ==
There are four mosques in Costa Rica:

- The Omar Mosque and Islamic Center of Costa Rica (Sunni) located in the Montelimar district in the Goicoechea Canton, which meets on Friday afternoons and is managed by the Muslim Cultural Center of Costa Rica. This was the first in the country and was founded in 2002. It is officiated by the Panama-born Sheikh Masihullah Bhana Patel and affiliated with the Islamic World Educational, Scientific and Cultural Organization based in Rabat, Morocco.
- The Light and Faith Mosque, also Sunni, is located in downtown San José and it is presided over by Jennifer Rashida Torres.
- The Belén Mosque, also Sunni, is located in La Ribera, Belén, Heredia. It is managed by panama born sheikh Masihullah Badat Rawat, Belen mosque is open for all 5 prayers a day as well as Friday prayer is held regularly.
- The Shiite mosque is sponsored by the Sahar Cultural Center and is located also in San José. Before the foundation of the Shia mosque, the Shiites congregated to pray in a private house or attended the Sunni mosque without problems. Ahmadiya Muslims also have a center in Costa Rica.

== Prominent Muslims ==
- Mahmud Sassa, doctor and Palestinian activist.
- Mohamed Aquil Alí, businessman, former president of Club Sport Herediano Canadian, of Mozambican origin.

== See also ==
- Latin American Muslims
- Religion in Costa Rica
- Latino Muslims
