= Omar Mosque and Islamic Center of Costa Rica =

Mosque in San José, Costa Rica

- Mezquita de Omar y el Centro Cultural Musulmán de Costa Rica
- Location of the mosque in Costa Rica

Religion
- Affiliation: Islam
- Ecclesiastical or organizational status: Mosque
- Status: Active

Location
- Location: San José
- Country: Costa Rica
- Interactive map of Omar Mosque and Islamic Center of Costa Rica
- Coordinates: 9°57′09″N 84°03′59″W

Architecture
- Type: Mosque
- Completed: 2002

The Omar Mosque and Islamic Center of Costa Rica (Spanish: Mezquita de Omar y el Centro Cultural Musulmán de Costa Rica) is a mosque in San José, Costa Rica.

== Overview ==
The construction of the mosque originated from a Palestinian migrant to the country. In early 1990s, he and other 14 people gathered at his house where they decided to build a mosque. They also traveled to Panama to ask to the local community there for financial support. The mosque was finally built and completed in 2002.

The mosque houses a library which features a collection of Islamic texts in Arabic and Spanish. It also holds classes on Islamic education to the local community.

== See also ==
- Lists of mosques in North America
- Islam in Costa Rica
