= Jinnah Memorial Mosque =

Mosque in Saint Joseph, Tunapuna–Piarco, Trinidad and Tobago

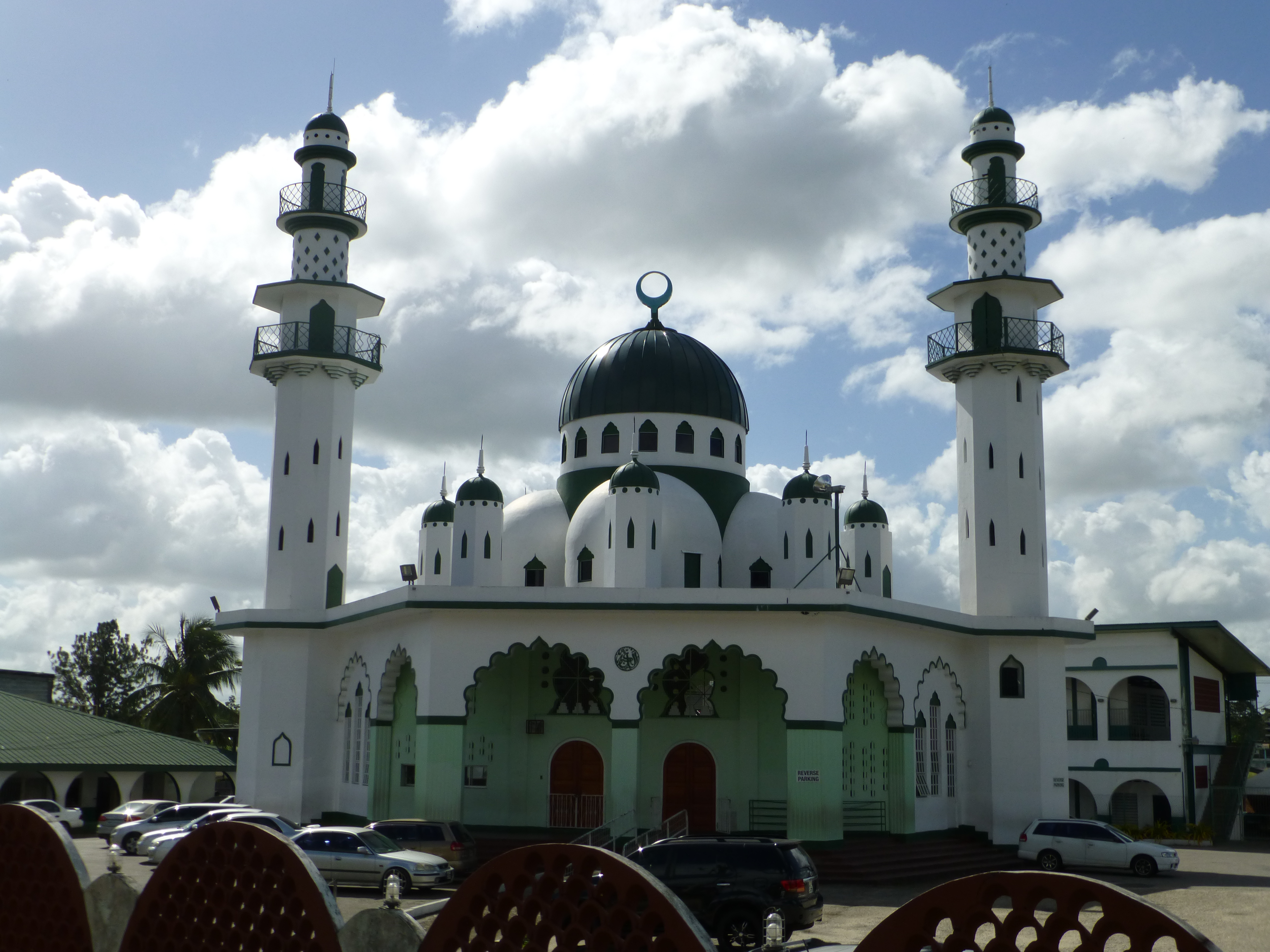

- Location within Trinidad and Tobago

Religion
- Affiliation: Islam

Location
- Location: Saint Joseph, Tunapuna–Piarco, Trinidad and Tobago
- Interactive map of Jinnah Memorial Mosque
- Coordinates: 10°39′06.0″N 61°24′48.5″W

Architecture
- Type: Mosque
- Funded by: Moulvi Ameer Ali
- Groundbreaking: 1947
- Completed: 1954

Specifications
- Capacity: 1,000 worshippers
- Minaret: 2

The Jinnah Memorial Mosque is a mosque in Saint Joseph, Tunapuna–Piarco Region, Trinidad and Tobago.

== History ==
The construction of the mosque started in 1947 after the British government granted a piece of land to the Trinidad Muslim League (TML). The construction was completed in 1954 with funds from Moulvi Ameer Ali, the founder of TML, and the group supporters. It was named in memory of Muhammad Ali Jinnah, the founder of Pakistan, a homeland for Muslims of the Indian subcontinent.

== Architecture ==
The mosque was designed by British architect. It consists of large and small domes on its rooftop with two minarets. Metal staircases were installed inside the two towers that go up to the top of the structure. The mosque can accommodate up to 1,000 worshippers.

== Gallery ==
Pictures of the exterior of the Mosque
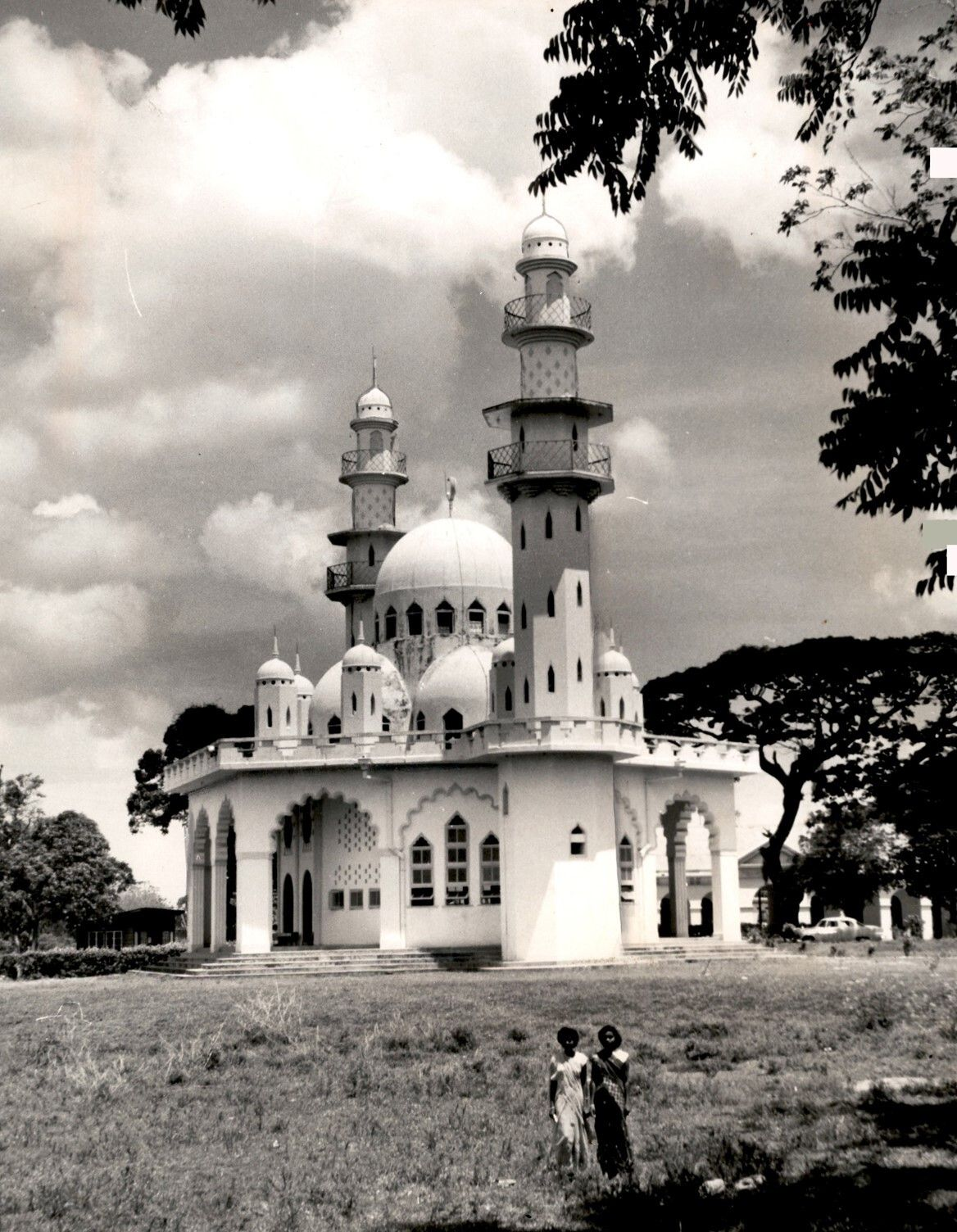
The Mosque in 1958

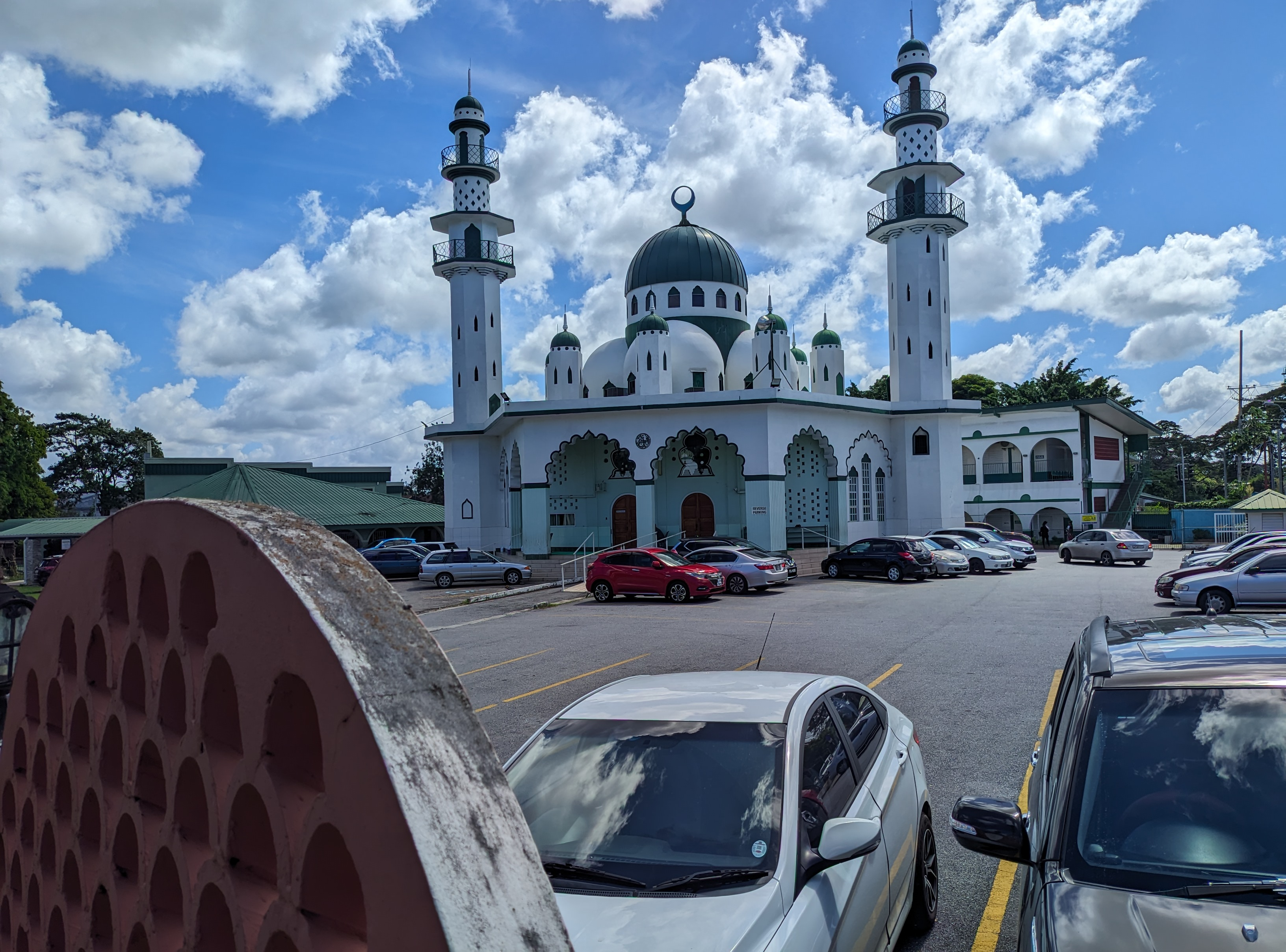
The Mosque in 2024

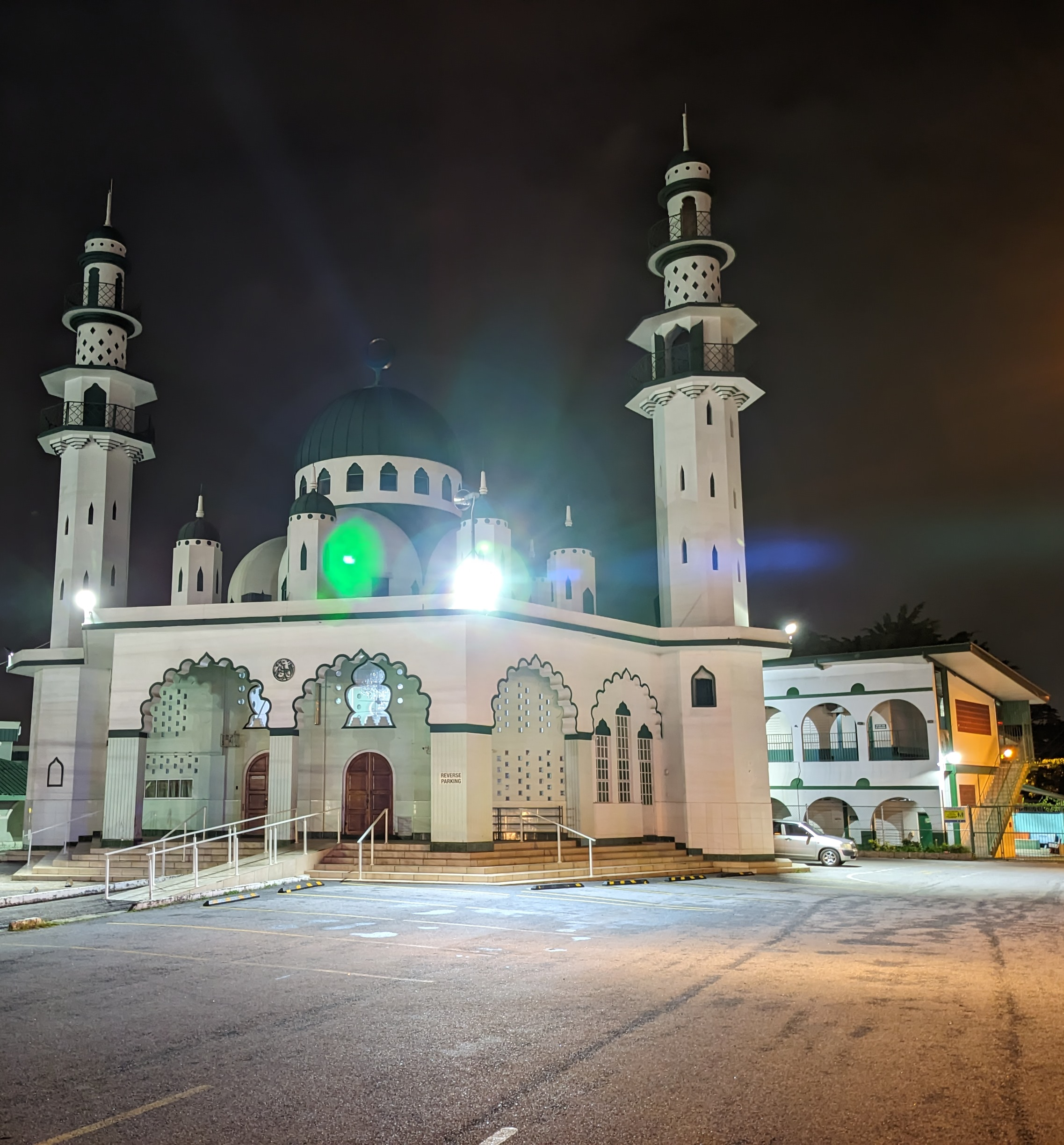
The Mosque at night

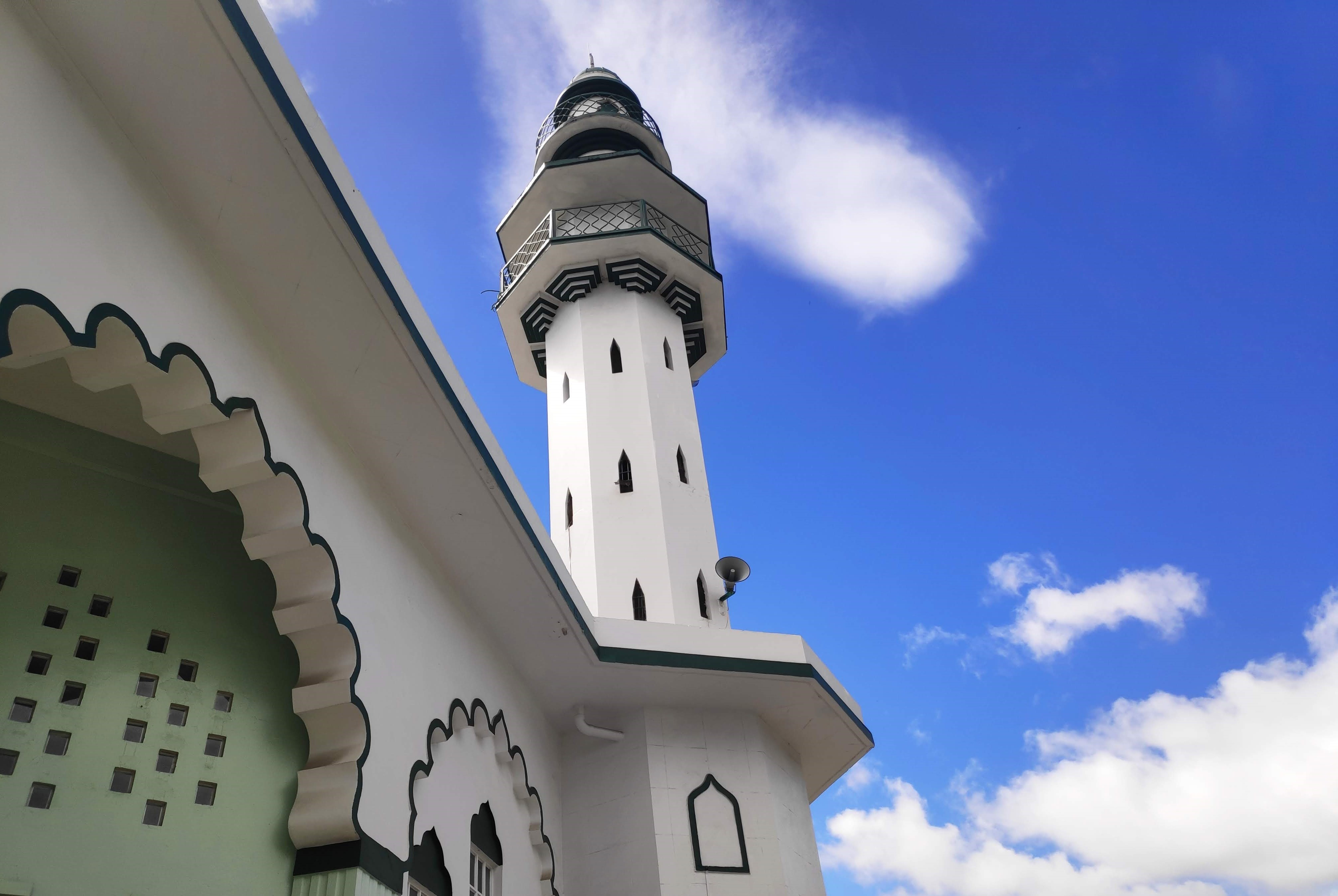
Minaret of the Mosque

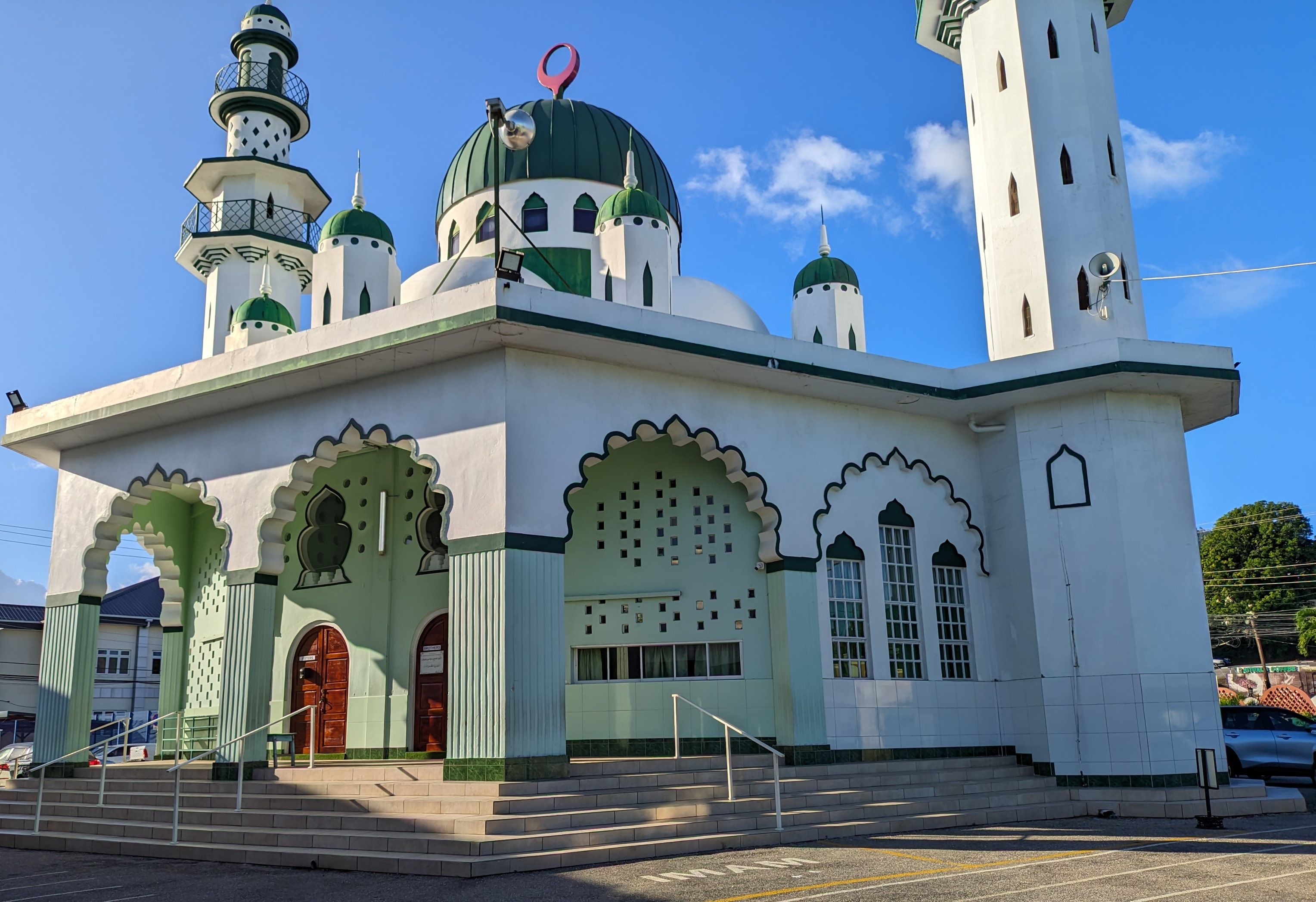
View of the Mosque from the entrance to the school
Pictures of the interior of the Mosque
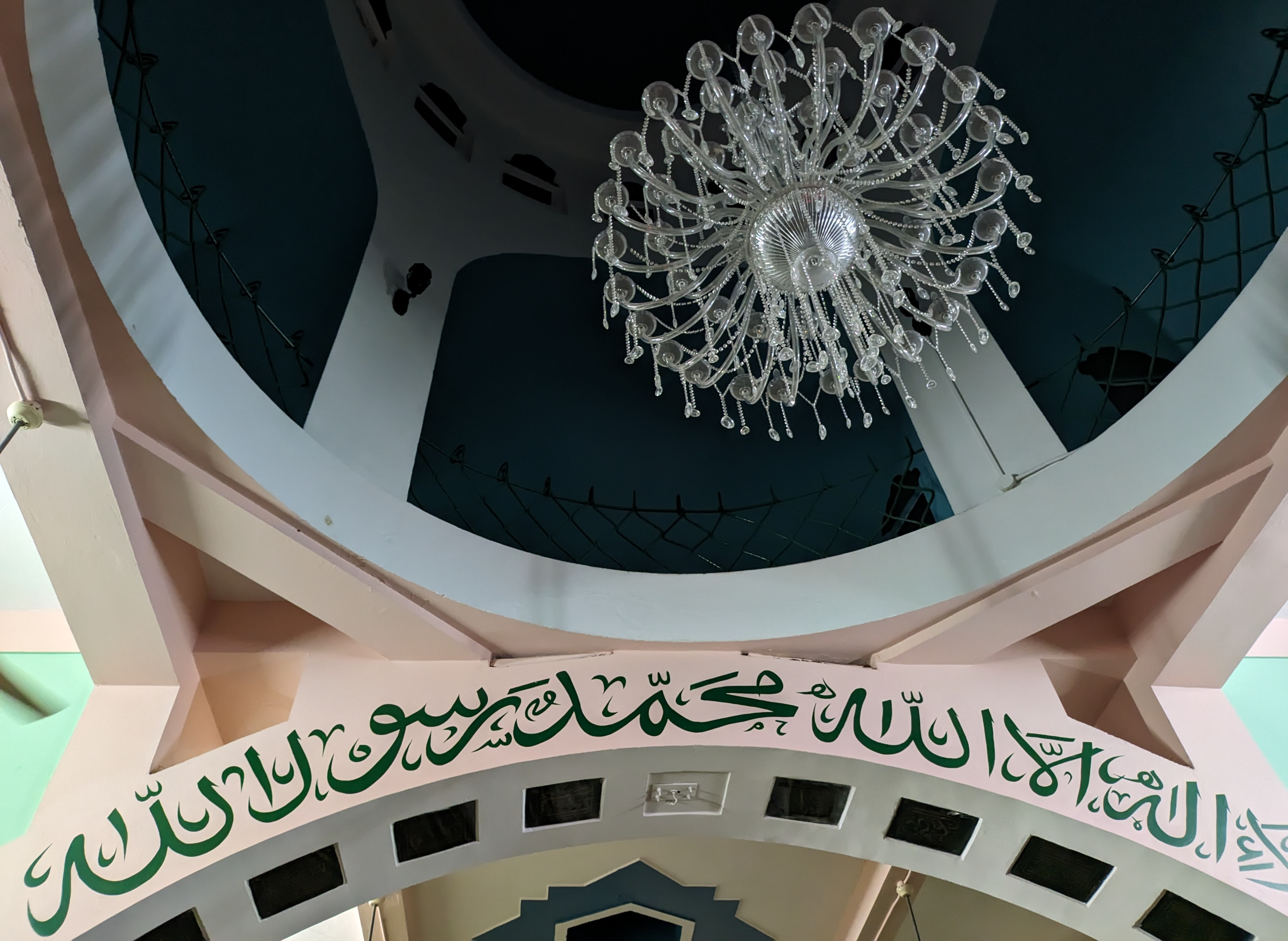
Chandelier and arch inside the Mosque

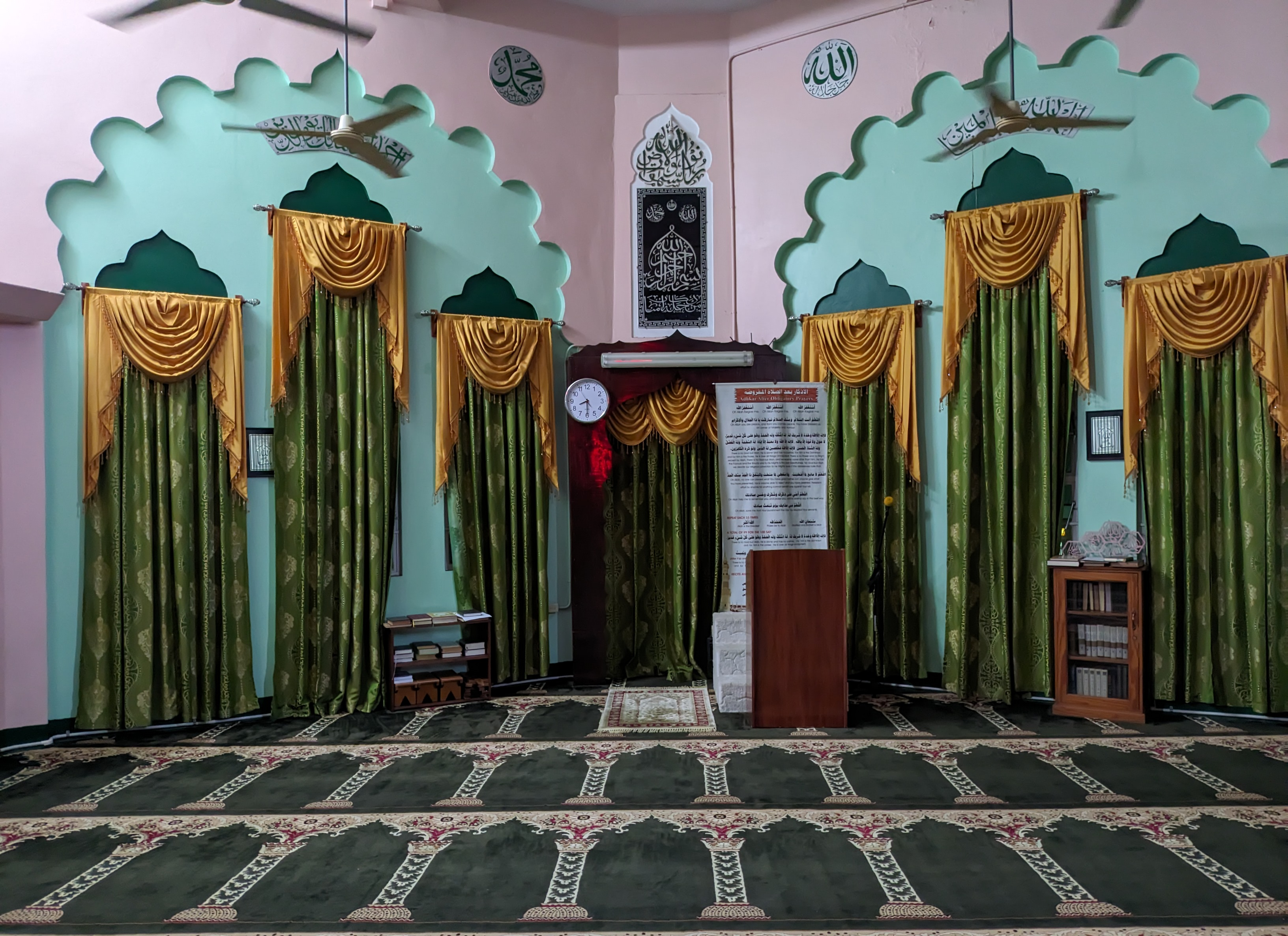
Front/brothers side of the Mosque at night

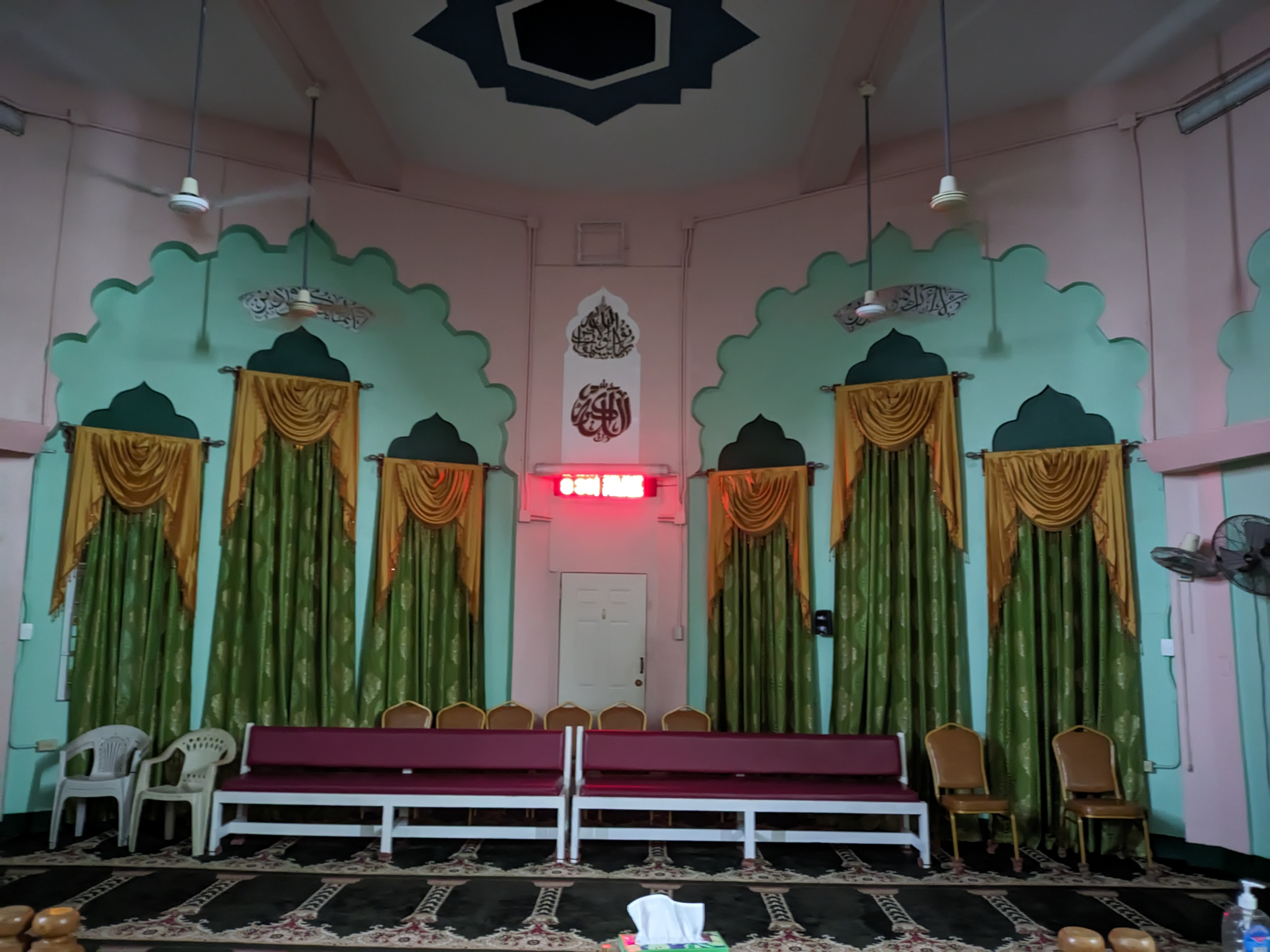
Back/sisters side of the Mosque at night

== See also ==
- Lists of mosques in North America
- Islam in Trinidad and Tobago
