= Jama Mosque, Barbados =

Mosque in Bridgetown, Barbados

Jama Mosque
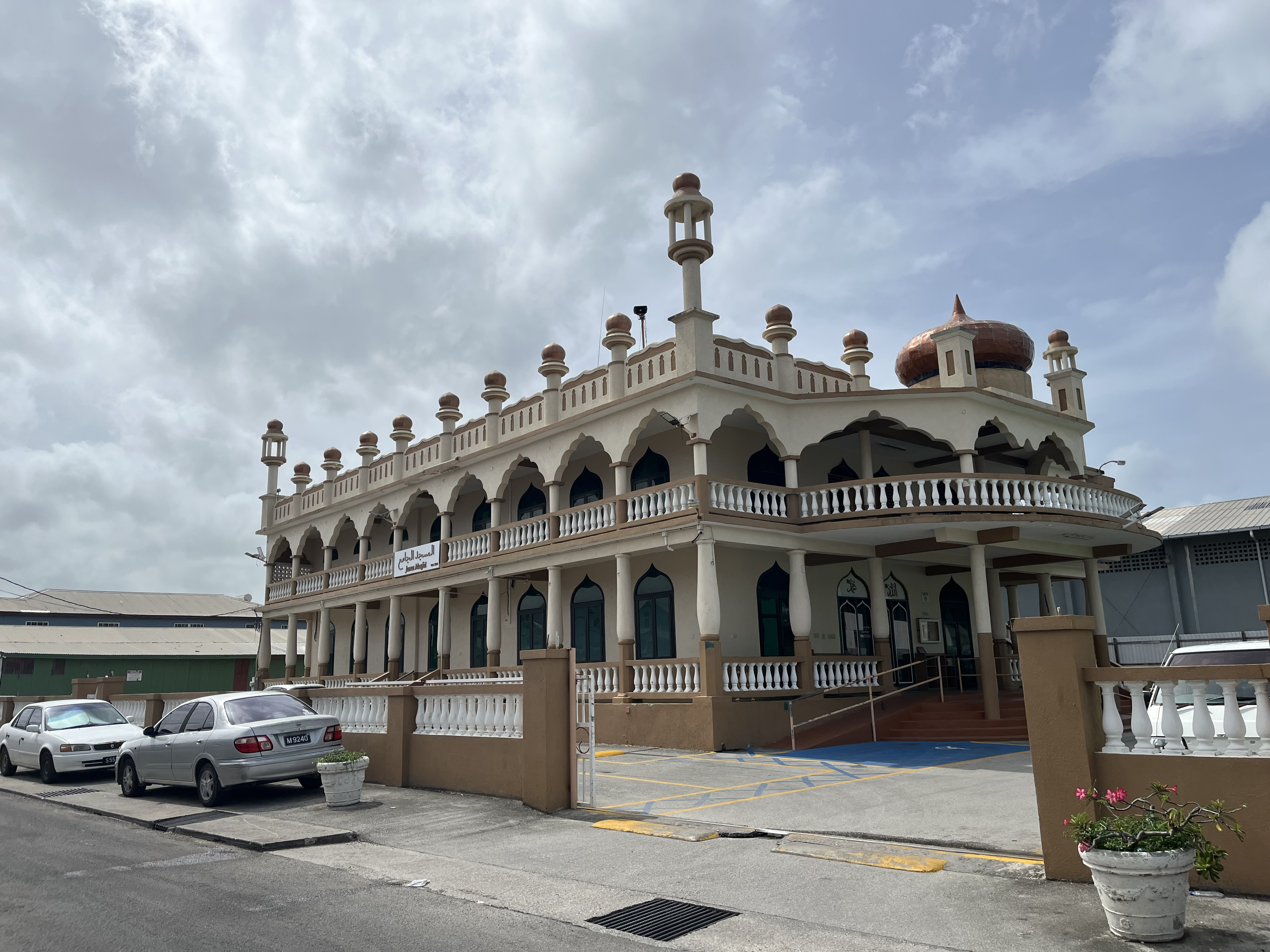

- Location of the mosque in Barbados

Religion
- Affiliation: Islam
- Ecclesiastical or organizational status: Friday mosque
- Leadership: Abdul Kothdiwala (president)
- Status: Active

Location
- Location: Bridgetown
- Country: Barbados
- Interactive map of Jama Mosque
- Coordinates: 13°06′07.3″N 59°37′21.2″W

Architecture
- Type: Mosque
- Founder: Mohammad Yusuf Degia
- Established: 26 January 1951
- Completed: 1951; 1980s (renovations)

Specifications
- Capacity: 528 worshippers
- Site area: 622 m^{2} (6,700 sq ft)
- Materials: Coral stone; glass

The Jama Mosque or Jumma Mosque is a mosque in Bridgetown, Barbados.

== Overview ==
In 1949, the community purchased a 622-square-metre (6,700 sq ft) site where the mosque stands today. The mosque was then constructed by Mohammad Yusuf Degia and was officially opened on 26 January 1951. In the mid-1980s, the mosque underwent renovation for expansion and completed in the late 1980s.

The mosque is the largest one in the country. It was built using local coral stones and decoration blocks were made with star-shaped design. The green glass windows of the mosque were brought in from Germany. The original mosque building opened in 1951 could accommodate 95 worshippers, but after the 1980s renovation, it now can accommodate up to 528 worshippers.

The mosque is accessible within walking distance east of Port of Bridgetown.

== See also ==
- Lists of mosques in North America
- Islam in Barbados
