= Da'wah Mosque of Guatemala =

Mosque in Guatemala City, Guatemala

- Mezquita de Aldawaa Islámica
- Location of the mosque in the Guatemala Department

Religion
- Affiliation: Islam
- Branch/tradition: Dawah movement
- Ecclesiastical or organizational status: Mosque
- Status: Active

Location
- Location: Guatemala City, Guatemala
- Interactive map of Da'wah Mosque of Guatemala
- Coordinates: 14°36′37.1″N 90°30′55.8″W

Architecture
- Type: Mosque
- Completed: 1987

The Da'wah Mosque of Guatemala, officially the Islamic Da'wah Mosque of Guatemala (Spanish: Mezquita de Aldawaa Islámica), is a mosque in Guatemala City, Guatemala. It is operated by the Dawah movement of Islam.

== Overview ==
The mosque was established in 1987, and is located at 4ta. calle 7–77 in Zone 9 of the city.

The mosque is available for the five daily prayers and offers classes in Islamic studies.

== See also ==
- Lists of mosques in North America
- Islam in Guatemala
