= Arab Union of Cuba =

- Predecessor: Lebanese Society of Havana, The Arab Center Society, The Arab-Palestine Society of Cuba, et al
- Founded: April 4, 1979; 47 years ago
- Founded at: Havana, Cuba
- Headquarters: The Cuban Arab Cultural Center
- President: Alfredo Deriche Gutiérrez
- Website: unionarabecuba.net

The Arab Union of Cuba (Spanish: Unión Árabe de Cuba; Arabic: الإتحاد العربي في كوبا) is an organization and community center in Havana, Cuba that aims to preserve and maintain the Arab community and culture in Cuba. The organization was founded through the merger of existing Arab organizations in Cuba, including the Lebanese Society of Havana, the Arab Center Society and the Society Arab Palestine of Cuba. The organization is housed at the Cuban Arab Cultural Center in the neighborhood of Centro Habana in Havana, Cuba.

== Background ==
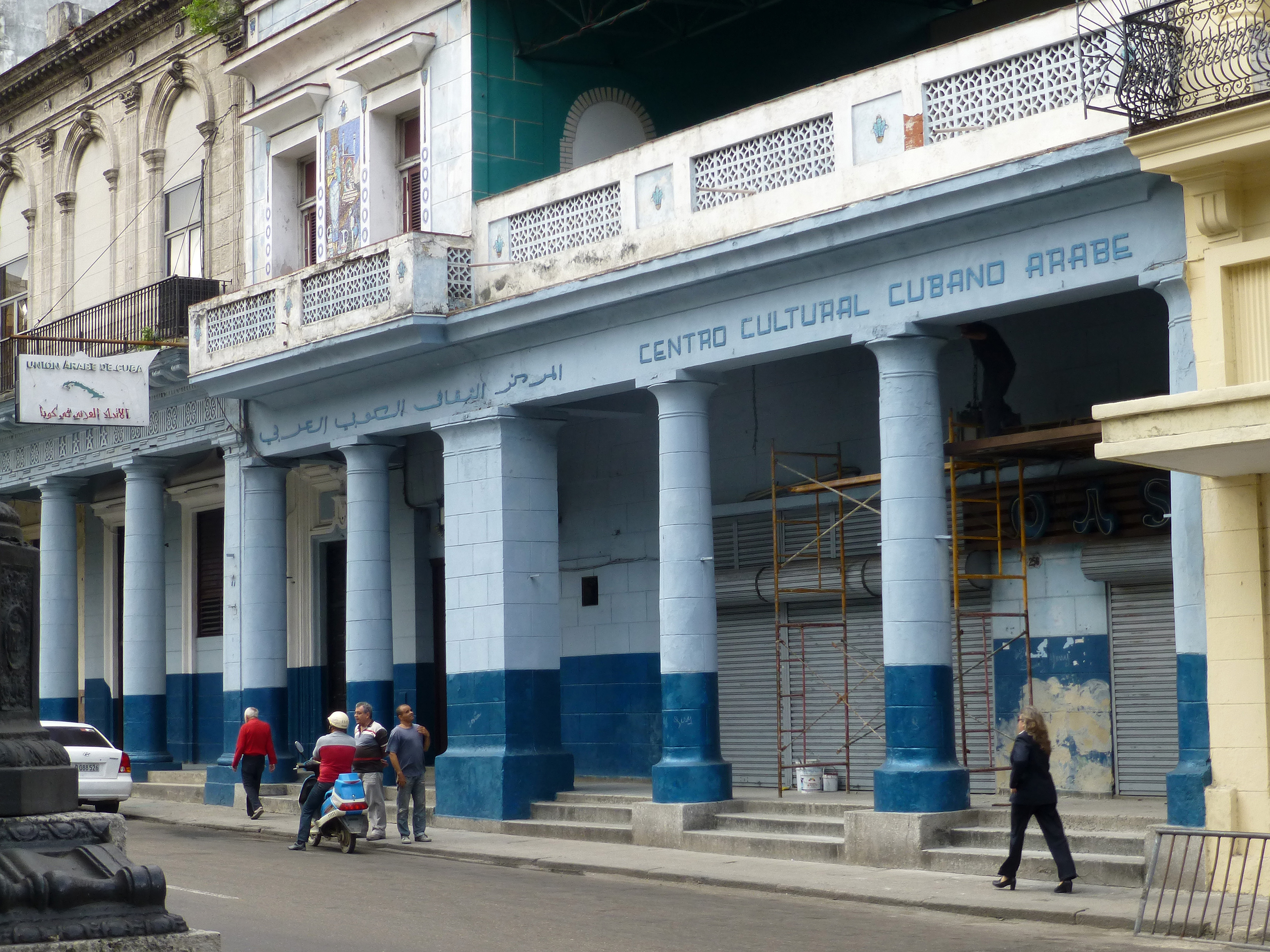
The Cuban Arab Cultural Center that houses the Arab Union of Cuba

Cuba received many Arabs, mainly Syrian, Lebanese, and Palestinian throughout the late nineteenth and early twentieth centuries. They formed organizations, societies, and clubs that advocated for their community's welfare. One of the first such societies include the Syrian Progress Society of Havana founded in 1905. In 1919, the Palestinian-Arab Society of Cuba, and the Lebanese Society of Havana shortly after were founded among many others throughout Cuba. These organizations consolidated into one today known as the Arab Union of Cuba.

== Today ==
The Arab Union of Cuba is housed at the Cuban Arab Cultural Center, and hosts classes and events mostly related to affairs regarding the Arab community, but also the Cuban community at large including Arabic language lessons, dance and choreography lessons, and weddings. The Cuban Arab Cultural Center also hosts an archival library of literature and documents related to the Arab community in Cuba.
