= Martin de Salaverría =

Martín de Salaverría was a Spanish military officer and from 1779 until 1783 civil governor of Trinidad.

Until 1777 the Spanish colony of Trinidad was governed by a single governor. In that year, based on a report by special commissioner Philippe Rose Roume de Saint-Laurent, the Spanish government decided that land grants to non-Spanish settlers on Trinidad should be administered by a non-military decision-maker. This meant a clipping of the responsibilities of the governor, Manuel Fálques. The edict was to be implemented by the intendancy in Caracas. The intendant appointed Martín de Salaverría, commander of the coastal guard in Caracas. Salaverría travelled to Trinidad in July 1778, at which time he held the rank of an emissary of the intendant of Caracas. His tasks included measures to increase the population of the strategically important island and the advancement of agriculture and trade.

In April 1779 the Spanish crown installed a dual leadership in Trinidad as an experiment: From then on, Fálques as the military governor was only responsible for military affairs (including the maintenance of the defensive capabilities and internal security). de Salaverría on the other hand, as the civil governor, was responsible for civil administration and general issues. The copy of the administrative act only arrived in Trinidad in August 1779. At this time de Salaverría was de facto the sole governor of the island as Fálques had died in July 1779. Following the arrival of the act copy, troop commander Rafael Delgado took over the position of the military governor with the approval of de Salaverría. His endorsement was later confirmed by the crown.

De Salaverría's term was characterized by constant turf battle, first with Fálques, then with Delgado. Among de Salaverría's merits were the relocation of the meeting place of the cabildo from San José de Oruña to Puerto España and the construction of the first Catholic church in Puerto España.

De Salaverría's term ended in October 1783. Depending on the source, he was either transferred to another position or died on Trinidad. His acting successor was Juan Francisco Machado.
