= Islam in Puerto Rico =

Religion in Puerto Rico

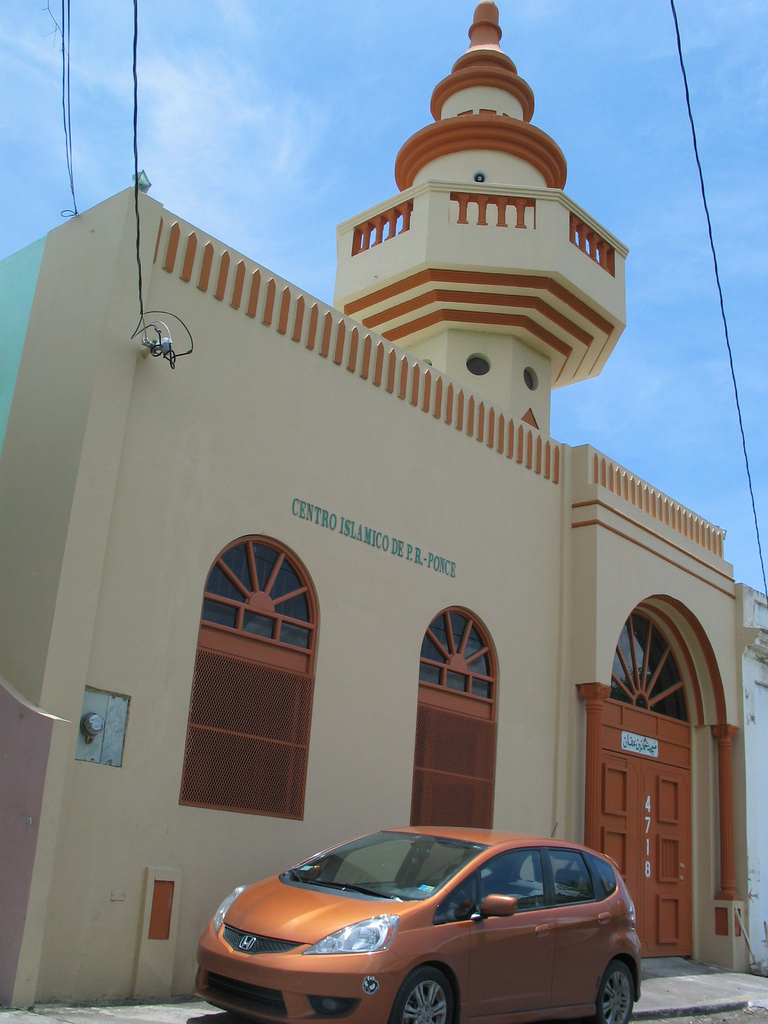
Islamic Center in Ponce

In 2007, there were over 5,000 Muslims residing in Puerto Rico, representing about 0.1% of the population. The early Muslim community largely consisted mainly of Palestinian and Jordanian immigrants who arrived between 1958 and 1962. At the time, the vast majority of Puerto Rico's Muslims lived in Caguas – a city in the island's central region located south of San Juan – where they operated restaurants, jewelry stores and clothing outlets. A storefront mosque on Calle Padre Colón in the Río Piedras district of San Juan served the entire religious community on the island during earlier years, however, today there are mosques and Islamic centers in Aguadilla, Arecibo, Hatillo, Ponce, Vega Alta, and San Juan. The American Muslim Association of North America (AMANA) also has an office in Cayey.

== History ==
Muslims first appeared in Puerto Rico in the 16th century when so-called Moriscos served as adventurers, traders, or enslaved laborers during the Spanish colonization of the Americas. Enslaved Muslims from West Africa were also transported to the island during the same period. Although the number of Muslims living in Puerto Rico was probably significant, these early communities didn't survive and were soon converted to Catholicism or other more syncretic African diasporic faiths.

In the 1970s, a group of Puerto Rican teenagers — Mark Ortiz, John Figueroa, Freddie González and Ramon Ocasio— began to consider converting to Islam after meeting with Abdullahi Rodriguez, one of the first Puerto Rican converts. In 1987, they created Alianza Islámica and established the first Spanish-language mosque in the United States. Their members grew to the hundreds in the 1990s and became the largest Latino Muslim organization in the United States. Alianza Islámica was shut down in 2003 after internal conflicts. At the time of its closing, the group had around 50 members.

In 2015, Miss Puerto Rico Destiny Vélez was suspended for her offensive tweets about muslims. They were posted in response to filmmaker Michael Moore expressing pro-muslim sentiment online. One tweet said that "Muslims use our constitution to terrorize USA & plant gas stations." Vélez later took down the tweets and apologized.

During the COVID-19 pandemic, Puerto Rican converts expressed feeling culture clash with their typically-Christian family while in lockdown at home. Converts have reported their Catholic parents not speaking to them.

Recently, there has been an increasing number of converts to Islam. According to an article in The Revealer, many Puerto Ricans encounter Islam first through meeting neighbors or coworkers. Islam's monotheism and principle of discipline appeals to Puerto Rican converts. Additionally, many Puerto Ricans sympathize with other global movements, like Palestinian self-determination.

As of 2026, it has been estimated that there are 15,000-20,000 Puerto Rican muslims living either in Puerto Rico or another area of the United States. Puerto Rican muslim converts have felt isolated from other muslim communities, as well as from their own Puerto Rican community, where Islam might not be well understood. Puerto Rican muslims deal with misconceptions or stereotypes that they are not culturally or ethnically Puerto Rican, that they converted for a romantic partner, or that they are anti-American.

== Culture ==
Puerto Rican muslims blend traditional Puerto Rican culture with their religion. In order to break fast during Ramadan, it has been reported they eat tostones, as opposed to the traditional dates. At Alianza Islámica meetings, Puerto Rican dishes containing pork were converted to halal versions with lamb.

Wilfredo Amr Ruiz, a Puerto Rican convert, expressed difficulty getting his friends and family to come to parties without alcohol.

== Notable mosques ==
This is a list of notable mosques (Arabic: Masjid, Spanish: Mezquita) in Puerto Rico, including Islamic places of worship that do not qualify as traditional mosques.

Name	Image	Location	Year	Group (Note: S = Sunni Islam; SH = Shia Islam; A = Ahmadiyya; ND = Non-denominational)	Notes
Centro Islámico de Ponce		Ponce			
Río Piedras Mosque		San Juan	1981		First mosque established in Puerto Rico. The mosque has a capacity of 200 men and 40 women and is located next to the University of Puerto Rico, Río Piedras Campus.
Al-Faruq Mosque		Vega Alta	1992		Largest mosque in Puerto Rico, with a capacity of 1,200 men and 120 women.
Masjid Montehiedra		San Juan	2007		The mosque has a capacity of 400 men and 50 women. Features an Islamic weekend school.
Islamic Center of Aguadilla		PR-111 in Palmar, Aguadilla, Puerto Rico			

Wilfredo Amr Ruiz in 2007 on his Hajj pilgrimage to Mecca

== Notable Puerto Rican Muslims ==
- Hector Camacho Jr., professional boxer
- Wilfredo Amr Ruiz, Communications Director for the Council on American-Islamic Relations Florida
- Kemuel Delgado, activist
- Hamza Perez, rapper
- Khadijah Rivera, activist

== See also ==
- Latin American Muslims
- Alianza Islámica
- Islam by country
- Latino Muslims
