= Lists of mosques in North America =

This is a list of lists of mosques in North America, including mosques in Central America, sorted by country.

== The Bahamas ==
Name	Images	Location	Year	Remarks
Jamaa' Ahlus Sunnah Bahamas Mosque		Nassau, New Providence	1978	

== Barbados ==
Name	Images	Location	Year	Remarks
Jama Mosque		Bridgetown	1951	First purpose-built mosque in Barbados. Expanded in the 1980s to become the largest mosque in Barbados.
Madina Mosque		Bridgetown	1957	
Masjid An Noor		40 Clermont Plains, Saint James, Barbados		
Darul Al Fazal Family mosque				

== Belize ==
Name	Images	Location	Year	Remarks
Al-Falah Mosque		Belize City	2008	First purpose-built mosque in Belize.
Masjid Al-Tauba		Belmopan		
Masjid Darus Salaam		Cayo District		

== Costa Rica ==
Name	Images	Location	Year	Remarks
Omar Mosque and Islamic Center of Costa Rica		San José	1995	First purpose-built mosque in Costa Rica.

== Cuba ==
Name	Images	Location	Year	Remarks
Abdallah Mosque		Santo Domingo	2015	

== Curaçao ==
Name	Images	Location	Year	Remarks
Omar bin Al-Khattab Mosque		Willemstad	1965	First purpose-built mosque in Curaçao.

== Dominican Republic ==
Name	Images	Location	Year	Remarks
Al Noor Mosque		Santo Domingo		

== El Salvador ==
Name	Images	Location	Year	Remarks
Salvadoran Arab Islamic Center		San Salvador	1994	Also known as "Mezquita de La Luz".
Fátimah Az-Zahra Islamic Center		Mejicanos	2004	
Dar-Ibrahim Mosque		San Salvador	2007	
Ismael El-Salvador Mosque			2009	
Palestina Tierra Santa Mosque			2011	

== Guatemala ==
Name	Images	Location	Year	Remarks
Da'wah Mosque of Guatemala		Guatemala City		

== Haiti ==
Name	Images	Location	Year	Remarks
Al Fatiha Mosque		Port-au-Prince	1993	First purpose-built mosque in Haiti.
Boukman Buhara Mosque		Cap-Haïtien	2016	First mosque in Haiti to feature a minaret.

== Jamaica ==
Name	Images	Location	Year	Remarks
Mahdi Mosque		Spanish Town and Westmoreland	1950s	Constructed by the Islamic Society of Jamaica, that was founded in 1950.

== Panama ==
Name	Images	Location	Year	Remarks
Panam Jama Mosque		Panama City	1981	It was established in 1981.
Madina Mazquita		Panama City		
Aguadulce Mosque				
Chepo Mosque				
Chitré Mosque (An-Nur Mosque)			2009	
Colon Mosque			1982	

== Trinidad and Tobago ==
Name	Images	Location	Year	Remarks
Iere Village Mosque		Iere	1868	First known mosque established in the Americas. The current building was constructed in 1968.
Jinnah Memorial Mosque		Saint Joseph	1954	

== United States ==
=== United States Virgin Islands ===
- Nur Mosque

== See also ==
- Islam in North America
- Lists of mosques (worldwide)
- List of mosques in South America
- List of the oldest mosques in the world
