= Arab Cubans =

Arab Cubans Árabes Cubanos
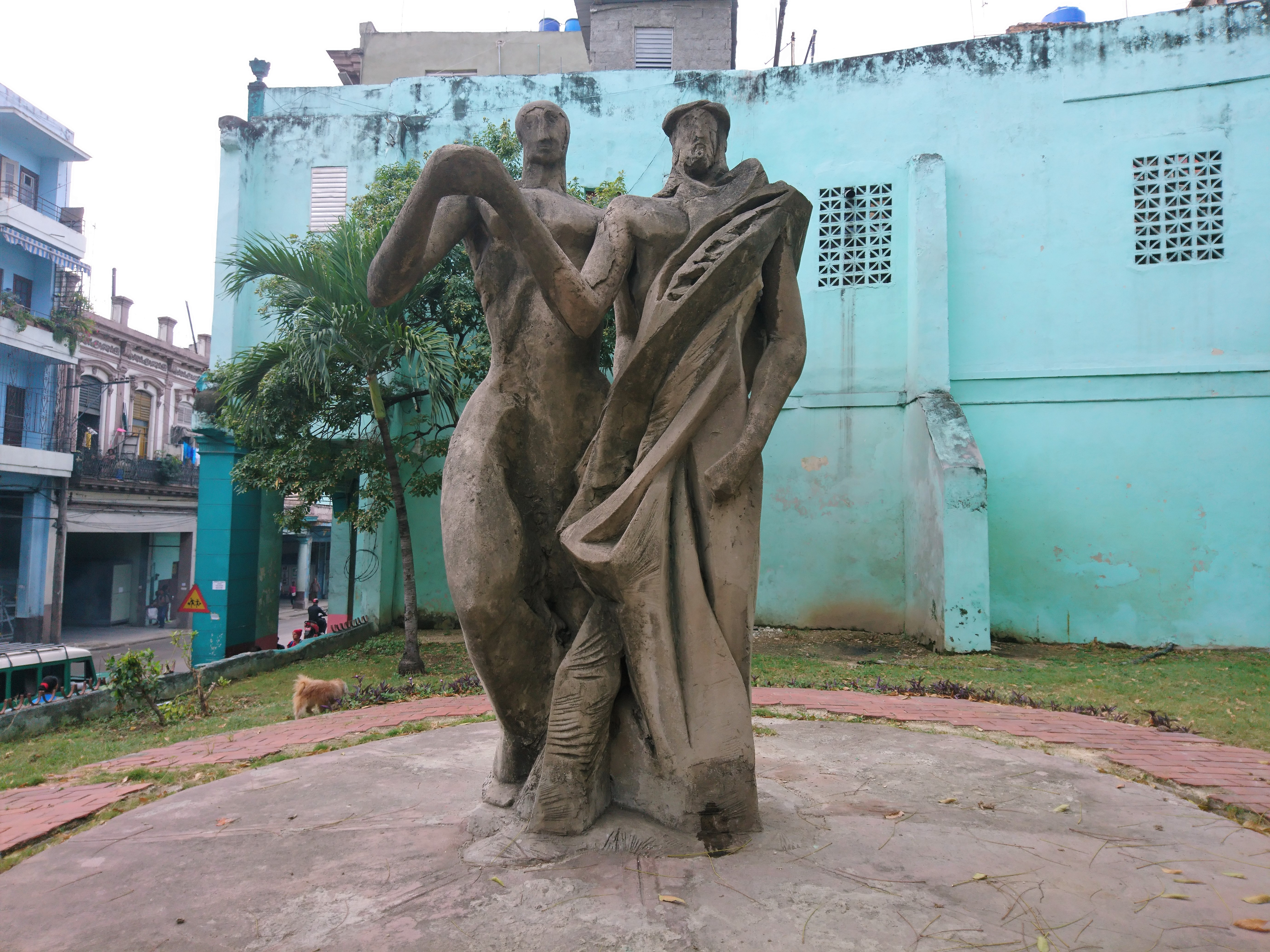
- Memorial to the Arab Immigrants

Total population
- ~120,000-250,000

Regions with significant populations
- Havana, Holguín, Santiago de Cuba

Languages
- Cuban Spanish, Arabic

Religion
- Majority Christianity, Minority Islam

Related ethnic groups
- Arabs, Syrians, Lebanese, Palestinians

Arab Cubans refers to Arab immigrants and their descendants in Cuba and the Cuban diaspora. Most of Cuba's Arab community come from Syrian, Lebanese or Palestinian backgrounds.

== History ==
While Arabic culture first came to Cuba through Spanish colonization, namely in the architecture and language, the Arab communities migrated to the island in the late nineteenth to early twentieth century. Many of the immigrants were economically motivated, but other elements including civil unrest and famine resulted in the emigration from their home countries. Most Arabs settled in Havana, with a significant number in Holguín and Santiago de Cuba, where they began establishing their businesses and institutions.

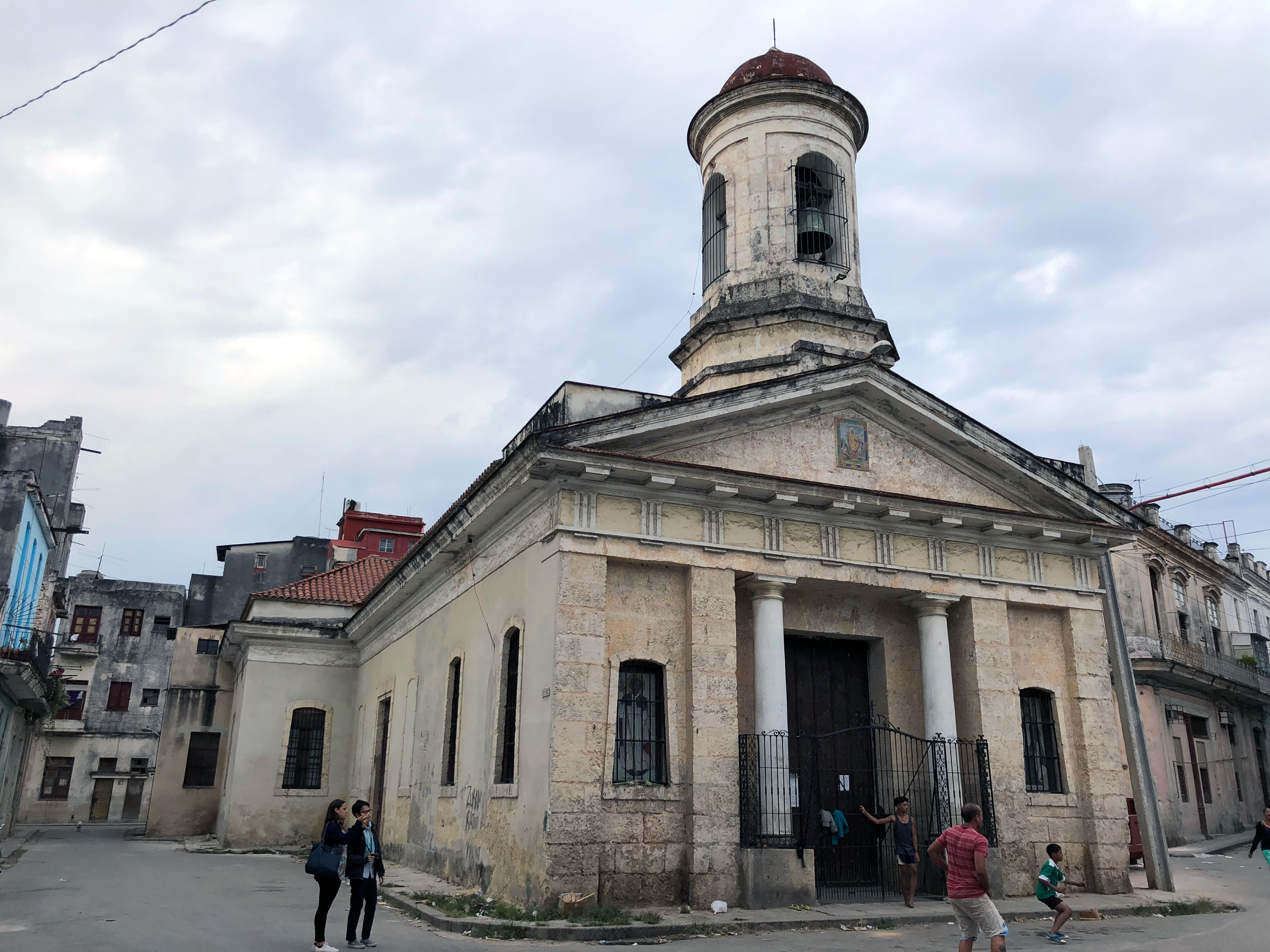
Church of San Judas Y San Nicolás de Bari

The neighborhood today known as Los Sitios, near Centro Habana and Habana Vieja, was home to nearly 25% of Cuba's Arab community during the migration periods of the early twentieth century. The Church of San Judas y San Nicolás near Calle Monte was a base for the Arab Maronite Catholic community in Havana during the early 20th century and is in continued operation until today.

Estimating the religious composition of Arab Cubans is difficult because of a lack of records. However, the Embassy of Lebanon last conducted a census on Lebanese descendants in Cuba in 1951. Most of the Lebanese-Arabs practiced the Maronite Catholic faith, while many adhered to other faiths including Orthodox Christian, Sunni Muslim, and Shia Muslim.

Arabic and Arab-centered newspapers existed in Cuba up until the 1970s, such as El Cercano Oriente (The Near East), El Árbol del Líbano (The Tree of Lebanon), Al-Etehad (The Union), Al-Faihaa (The Spacious), Al-Sayf (The Saber), and La Unión (The Union).

== Arab Union of Cuba ==
Arab organizations and associations began appearing during their immigration and existed in nearly every urban area in Cuba. Founded in 1979, The Arab Union of Cuba is the most notable and established Arab association in Cuba and it still operates today. Among the Arab Union of Cuba's work is the development of the Memorial to Arab Immigrants in the Park of the Arab Immigrant on Calle Monte in Havana's Los Sitios neighborhood.

== Figures ==
Cities of Arrival for Arab Immigrants
City	Percentage
Havana	20.5%
Holguín	10.6%
Santiago de Cuba	3.9%
Camagüey	3.3%
Matanzas	3.1%
Guantánamo	2.9%
Ciego de Ávila	2.8%
Santa Clara	2.7%
Puerto Padre	2.7%
Cárdenas	2.4%
Marianao	2.3%
Guanabacoa	2.2%

Arab migration to Cuba from 1920 to 1931
Year	Total
1920	1682
1921	2275
1922	2232
1923	5342
1924	15954
1925	26795
1926	11139
1927	12086
1928	6460
1929	5426
1930	1180
1931	600

== Notable Arab Cubans ==
- Yamil Chade, sports manager
- Cucu Diamantes, singer, songwriter, actress, and philanthropist
- Emilio Estefan, musician and producer
- Emily Estefan, music artist
- Lili Estefan, model and host of El Gordo y la Flaca on Univision.
- Jamillette Gaxiola, model and Miss Cuba 2009
- Taufic Guarch, footballer
- Fayad Jamís, poet, painter, designer, journalist and translator
