= José María Chacón =

Don José María Chacón (1 January 1749 – 1 January 1833) was the last Spanish Governor of Trinidad, serving from 1783 to 1797. He was responsible for signing the Cedula of Population in 1783, leading to extensive French immigration to Trinidad. Chacón founded the city of San Fernando in 1784. The governor Chacón devoted much of his time to developing the island. He compelled the province's cabildo (governing council) of San José de Oruña to move to Port of Spain and he limited its powers to the municipality. The settlement of French Catholics on the island, led to a rapid increase in the town's population and its geographical extension westwards.

In 1797 Chacón surrendered Trinidad to a British fleet under the command of Sir Ralph Abercromby. The King of Spain set up a "Council of War" to look into the surrender. By royal decree, Chacón and Rear Admiral Sebastián Ruiz de Apodaca (who had scuttled his small fleet) were banished for life from the "Royal Domain." Apodaca's case was reconsidered and he was reinstated in 1809, but Chacón died in exile.

Trinidad and Tobago's national flower, the chaconia, is named after Chacón.

== See also ==
- History of Trinidad and Tobago

Preceded by vacant	Governor of Trinidad; 1783 - 1797	Succeeded by Sir Ralph Abercromby
