= Saint Joseph, Trinidad and Tobago =

Saint Joseph San José de Oruña
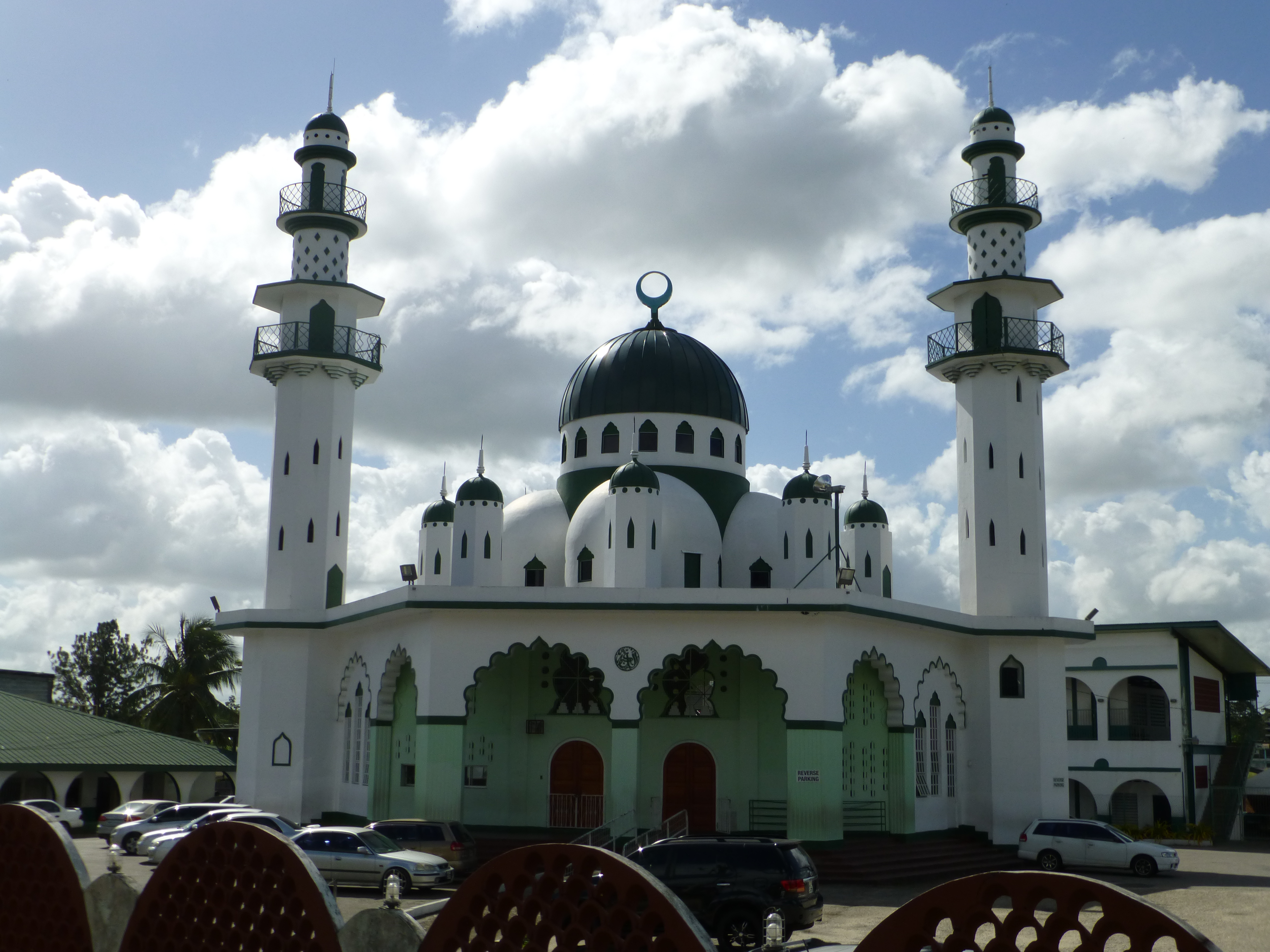
- Jinnah Memorial Mosque

- Location in Trinidad and Tobago
- Coordinates: 10°39′20″N 61°25′00″W
- Country: Trinidad and Tobago
- Region: Tunapuna-Piarco
- Settled: 1592
- Named for: Saint Joseph

Population (2011)
  - Total: 8,001

Saint Joseph was founded in 1592 by Antonio de Berrio and is the oldest town in Trinidad and Tobago. Originally named San José de Oruña, it was the capital of Spanish Trinidad between 1592 and 1783. In 1595, it was attacked and held by Sir Walter Raleigh and was used as a base for his exploration of the Orinoco River in search of the fabled city of El Dorado. Soon after his return the place was burnt and sacked.

St. Joseph is not an incorporated municipality. It falls within the boundaries of the Tunapuna–Piarco region.

It has several schools, including St. Joseph's Convent, St. Joseph Boys Roman Catholic School, St. Joseph Girls Roman Catholic School, St. Joseph Government School, St. Joseph College, T.M.L Primary School, St Joseph and St. Xavier's Preparatory School.

== Politics ==
Saint Joseph is part of the Aranguez/St. Joseph parliamentary constituency for elections to the Parliament of Trinidad and Tobago.

== Tourist attractions ==
- Jinnah Memorial Mosque

== See also ==
- St. Joseph Mutiny
