= Chinese Islamic Cultural and Educational Foundation =

Organization based in Da'an, Taipei, Taiwan

- 中國回教教育文化基金會
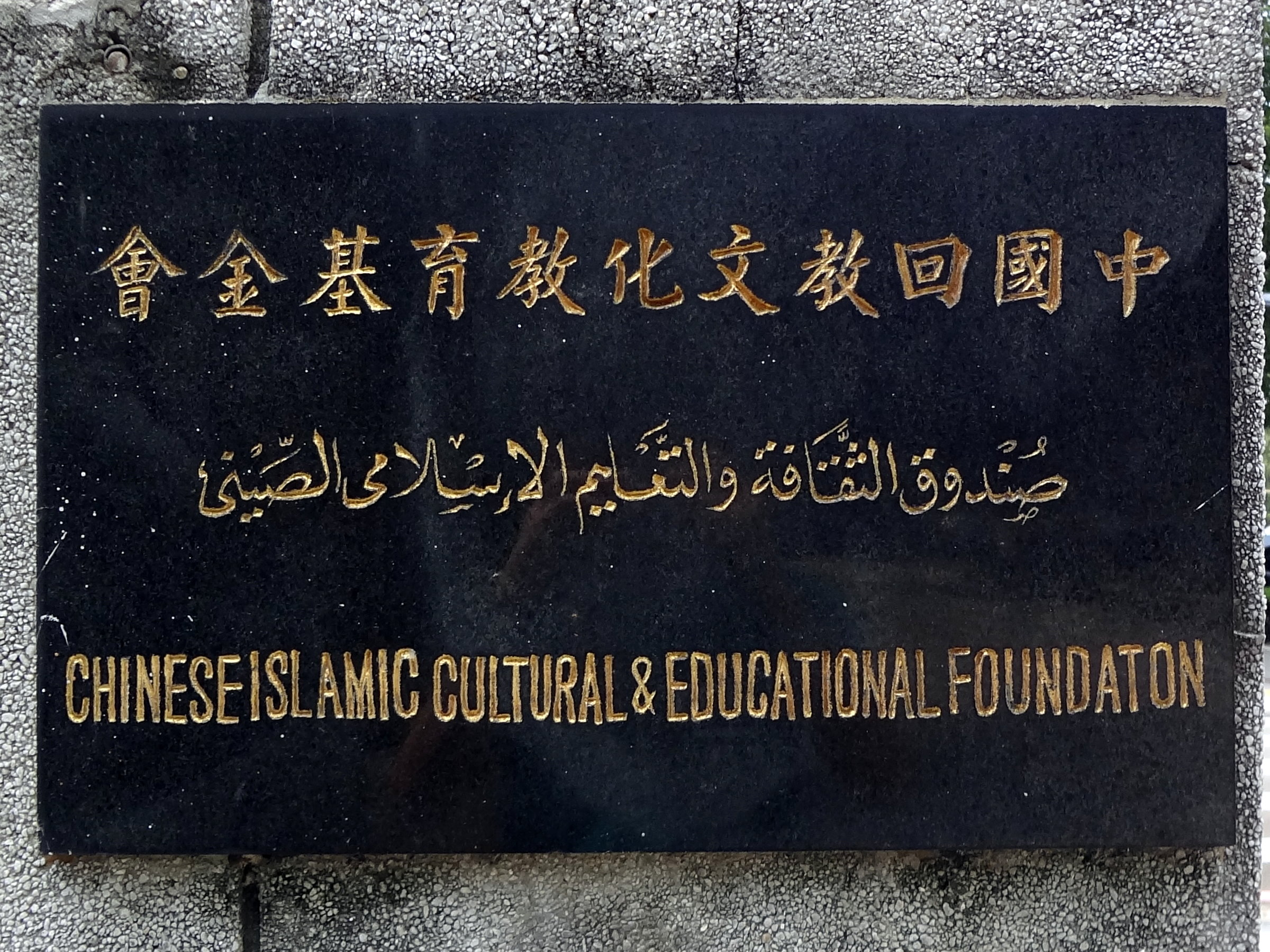
- Abbreviation: CICEF
- Formation: 1976
- Headquarters: Taipei Grand Mosque
- Location: No. 62, Sec. 2, Xing Sheng South Road, Da'an, Taipei, Taiwan
- Website: Official website (in Chinese)

The Chinese Islamic Cultural and Educational Foundation (CICEF; traditional Chinese: 中國回教教育文化基金會; simplified Chinese: 中国回教教育文化基金会; pinyin: Zhōngguó Huíjiào Jiàoyù Wénhuà Jījīn Huì) is an organization of Chinese Muslims in Taiwan. It is the first cultural foundation for Islamic education in Taiwan.

== History ==
The foundation was established in 1976 by brothers Chang Zixuan (常子萱) and Chang Zichun (常子春) with a donation of NT$3 million. With the foundation being registered in 1982.

== Activities ==
The association is based at the Taipei Grand Mosque in Taipei. It has been doing several activities such as propagating and preaching Islamic culture and doctrine, providing scholarships for the needy students, sponsoring the translation of Islamic scriptures and promoting communication and cooperation among Muslims around the world.

They also present awards to people who contribute to Islamic affairs, whose written works promote Islamic scholarship, have made significant contribution in national, religious and social work or who serve as Islamic youth model.

== Structures ==
Composition of the foundation is:

- Board of directors
- Board chairman
- Executive board
- Executive secretary
- Office for international culture and education
- Office of academic
- Office of youth activity
- Office for library
- Office of finance
- Consultant

== See also ==
- Islam in Taiwan
- List of mosques in Taiwan
- Chinese Muslim Association
- Chinese Muslim Youth League
- Taiwan Halal Integrity Development Association
