= Taipei Mosque =

The Taipei Mosque may refer to:

- Taipei Grand Mosque in Da'an District, Taipei, Taiwan
- Taipei Cultural Mosque in Zhongzheng District, Taipei, Taiwan
