= Chinese Muslim Youth League =

Religious organization in Taiwan

- 中國回教青年會
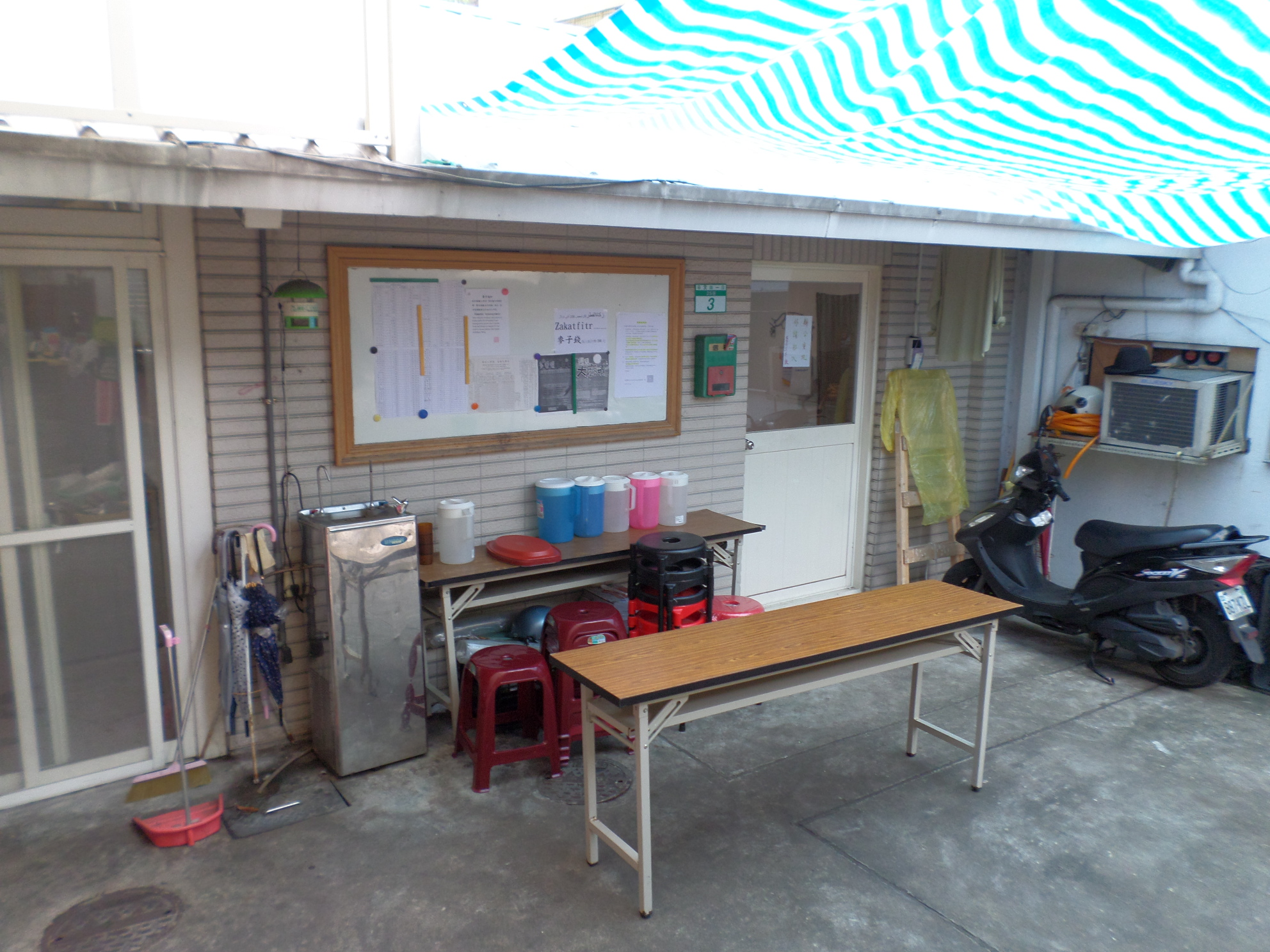
- Predecessor: Chinese Muslim Youth Cultural Improvement Association
- Formation: 1930s
- Founded at: Mukden, Liaoning, Republic of China
- Headquarters: Taipei Cultural Mosque
- Location: Da'an, Taipei, Taiwan

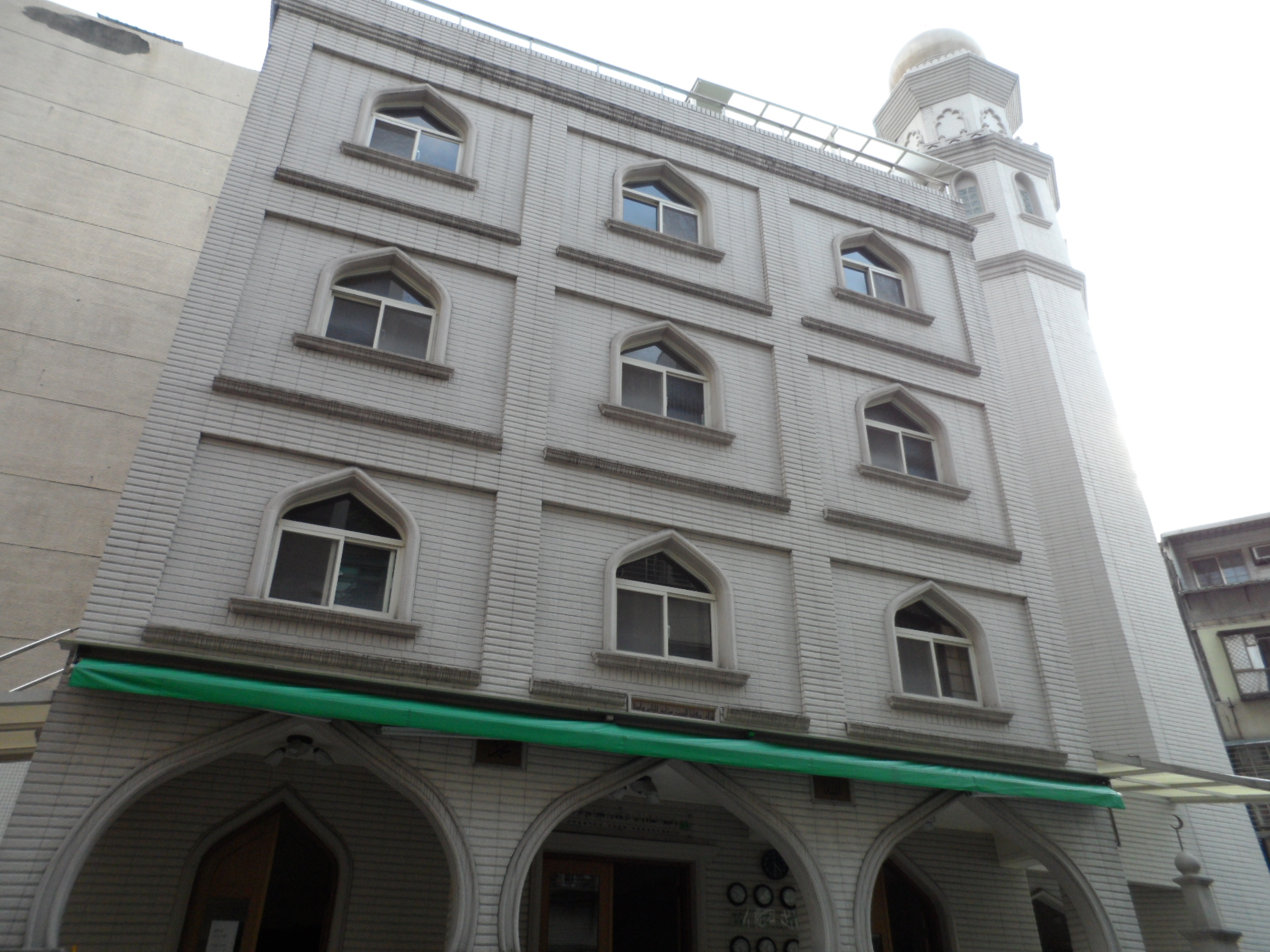
Taipei Cultural Mosque

The Chinese Muslim Youth League (traditional Chinese: 中國回教青年會; simplified Chinese: 中国回教青年会; pinyin: Zhōngguó Huíjiào Qīngniánhuì) or Chinese Islamic Youth Association is an organization of Chinese Muslims in the Republic of China (Taiwan).

== History ==
Chinese Muslim Youth League was established with the name Chinese Muslim Youth Cultural Improvement Association in early 1930s in Mukden during the Second Sino-Japanese War to unite Muslim young men for the war against Imperial Japanese Army and Japanese puppet state of Manchukuo.

During the late 1940s of Chinese Civil War, many members of Chinese Muslim Youth Cultural Improvement Association migrated to Kwangtung Province. In July 1949 at Canton, the association reorganized themselves with other interested Muslim groups and forming the Chinese Muslim Youth Anti-Communist and Nation-Building League. Later in that year the league left Kwangtung and moved to Taiwan. In 1957, the league adopted its present name, the Chinese Muslim Youth League.

== Activities ==
The league built and runs the Taipei Cultural Mosque, in which it becomes the group headquarters. It requires formal registration of its membership. In mid-1969, it recorded 560 members, including 55 Taiwanese converts. Most of the members live in and around Taipei, and some are scattered around Taiwan.

Religious identification of Chinese Muslim Youth League is often denied by the Chinese Muslim Association members who call them heretical. In the view of Muslims who live in the non-Islamic areas but intend to keep the Muslim faith, the Chinese Muslim Youth League makes too many compromises with the infidels. This principal reason is the reason for their isolation from the Islamic world.

Although the organization never actively sponsor any Islamic missionary work, they still host some conversions, mostly for marriage reason. In general, the league feels that they have more appeal to younger and more progressive groups. It conducts regular classes for younger people and stresses instruction in Islamic law and theology rather than in Arabic language and ceremonial concerns.

== See also ==
- Islam in Taiwan
- List of mosques in Taiwan
- Chinese Islamic Cultural and Educational Foundation
- Taiwan Halal Integrity Development Association
