= Baitul Muslimin Mosque =

Mosque in Su'ao, Yilan County, Taiwan

- 巴特爾穆斯林清真寺
- Location of the mosques in Taiwan

Religion
- Affiliation: Sunni Islam
- Ecclesiastical or organizational status: Mosque
- Status: Active

Location
- Location: 21 Lixing Street, Su'ao, Yilan County
- Country: Taiwan
- Interactive map of Baitul Muslimin Mosque
- Coordinates: 24°34′53″N 121°51′51″E

Architecture
- Type: Mosque
- Established: 2014
- Completed: 2019 (current location)

Chinese name
- Traditional Chinese: 巴特爾穆斯林清真寺
- Simplified Chinese: 巴特尔穆斯林清真寺
Transcriptions
Standard Mandarin
- Hanyu Pinyin: Bātè'ěr Mùsīlín Qīngzhēnsì

Indonesian name
- Indonesian: Masjid Baitul Muslimin

The Baitul Muslimin Mosque (traditional Chinese: 巴特爾穆斯林清真寺; simplified Chinese: 巴特尔穆斯林清真寺; pinyin: Bātè'ěr Mùsīlín Qīngzhēnsì; Indonesian: Masjid Baitul Muslimin) is a mosque in the Su'ao Township of Yilan County, Taiwan. It was the first mosque in Yilan County.

== History ==
The mosque was established at 16 Nan'an Road in 2014 when a group of fishermen from Indonesia working in the area were looking for a place of worship. After learning that the landlord had decided to sell the house where the mosque was located, they moved the mosque to its current location in 2019 with the help of the Chinese Muslim Association.

== Activities ==
The mosque regularly holds various Muslim-related activities and festivals. It is also the center of gathering for fishermen working in the nearby ports, such as the Nanfang'ao Fishing Port. The mosque is also the center for information and complaint center for the migrant workers from Indonesia.

== Transportation ==
The mosque is within walking distance southeast of Su'ao Station of Taiwan Railway.

== See also ==
- Islam in Taiwan
- List of mosques in Taiwan
