= Kaohsiung Mosque =

Mosque in Lingya, Kaohsiung, Taiwan

- 高雄清真寺
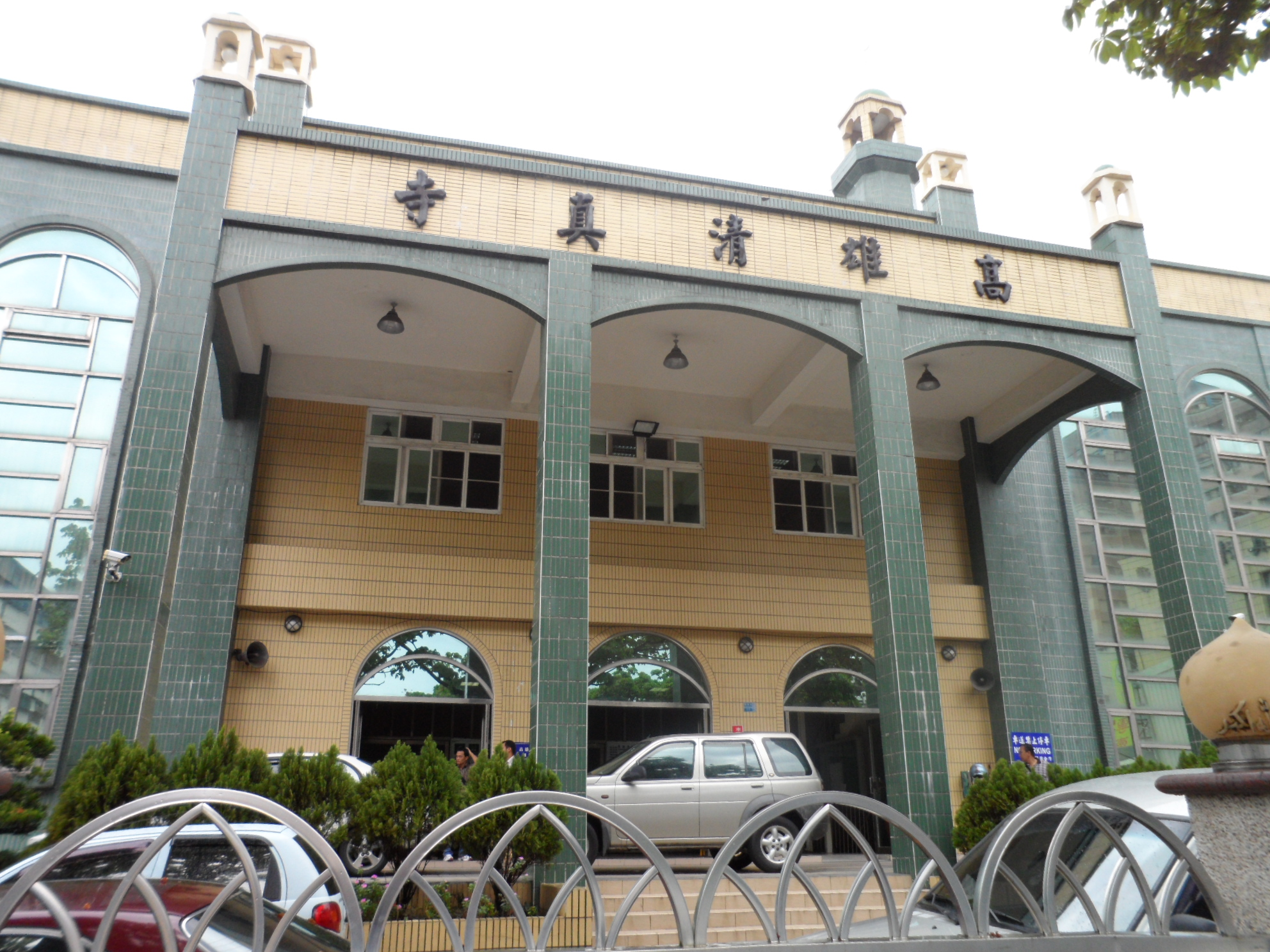

- Location of the mosque in Kaohsiung

Religion
- Affiliation: Sunni Islam
- Ecclesiastical or organizational status: Mosque
- Status: Active

Location
- Location: 11 Jianjun Road, Lingya, Kaohsiung
- Country: Taiwan
- Interactive map of Kaohsiung Mosque
- Coordinates: 22°37′41″N 120°20′31″E

Architecture
- Type: Mosque
- Completed: 1949 (original); 1951 (second); 1992 (current)
- Construction cost: US$1,900,000 (1992)

Specifications
- Interior area: 2,657 m^{2} (28,600 sq ft)
- Minaret: 2 (maybe more)

Website
- kh-masjid.org.tw (in Chinese)

Chinese name
- Traditional Chinese: 高雄清真寺
Transcriptions
Standard Mandarin
- Hanyu Pinyin: Gāoxióng Qīngzhēnsì
Southern Min
- Hokkien POJ: Ko-hiông Chheng-chin-sī

The Kaohsiung Mosque (Chinese: 高雄清真寺; pinyin: Gāoxióng Qīngzhēnsì; Pe̍h-ōe-jī: Ko-hiông Chheng-chin-sī) is a mosque in the Lingya District of Kaohsiung, Taiwan. Completed in 1949, it was the second mosque built in Taiwan, after the Taipei Grand Mosque.

== History ==
=== 1949 structure, Wufu 4th Road ===
The Kaohsiung Mosque was built in 1949 by Muslim nationalists after their defeat against the communists in the Chinese Civil War. Initially, Muslim public officers worked with the Kuomintang government to suggest the construction of a new mosque in Taiwan and started to raise funds from January 1949. Initially, they rented a 270 square metres (2,900 sq ft) at 117 Wufu 4th (五福四) Road in Yancheng District as a temporary location.

=== 1951 structure, Linsen 1st Road ===
Due to the limited space available at 117 Wufu 4th Road, they moved to a 460-square-metre (5,000 sq ft) Japanese wooden style building at 196 Linsen 1st (林森一) Road in Sinsing District in 1951. The main prayer hall area was 135 square metres (1,450 sq ft). With the growing number of Muslim worshipers, they started to raise funds for the new mosque. In October 1988, the land of the old mosque were sold and the money they received was used to finance the construction of the new mosque. 196 Linsen 1st Road now houses FarEasTone customer care service center.

=== 1992 structure, Jianjun Road ===
In February 1990, plans began to move the mosque to the current bigger site and better equipped building to accommodate their growing numbers of Muslims located at 11 Jianjun (建軍) Road in Lingya District. Construction started on 17 December 1990, was completed in late December 1991 at a cost of US$1,900,000, and the mosque was opened in April 1992.

== Architecture ==
The Kaohsiung Mosque is a three-storey building that features a large Middle Eastern vault. The design of the prayer hall, nooks, corners and components of the buildings are based on traditional mosques in the Middle East. The building covers an area of 2,657 square metres (28,600 sq ft).

The first floor is the male and female dormitories, female prayer room and female activity center. The second floor is the main prayer hall, study center for Arabic, and an Islamic culture display room. The third floor is the guest room, youth activity center, office and kitchen. The mosque also features the imam's office, administration office, library and wudu.

Adjacent to the mosque are some Halal restaurants.

== Transportation ==
Kaohsiung Mosque is accessible within walking distance North from Weiwuying Station of the Kaohsiung MRT.

== Gallery ==
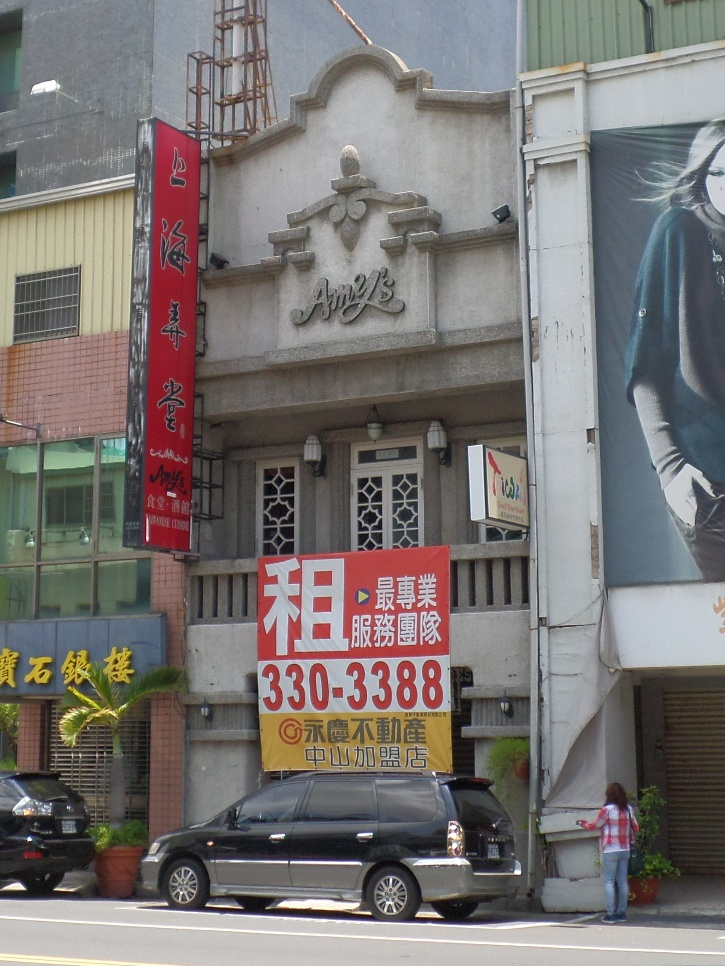
The former mosque, on Wufu 4th Road

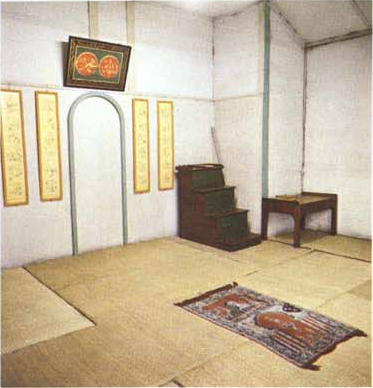
The former mosque, on Linsen 1st Road

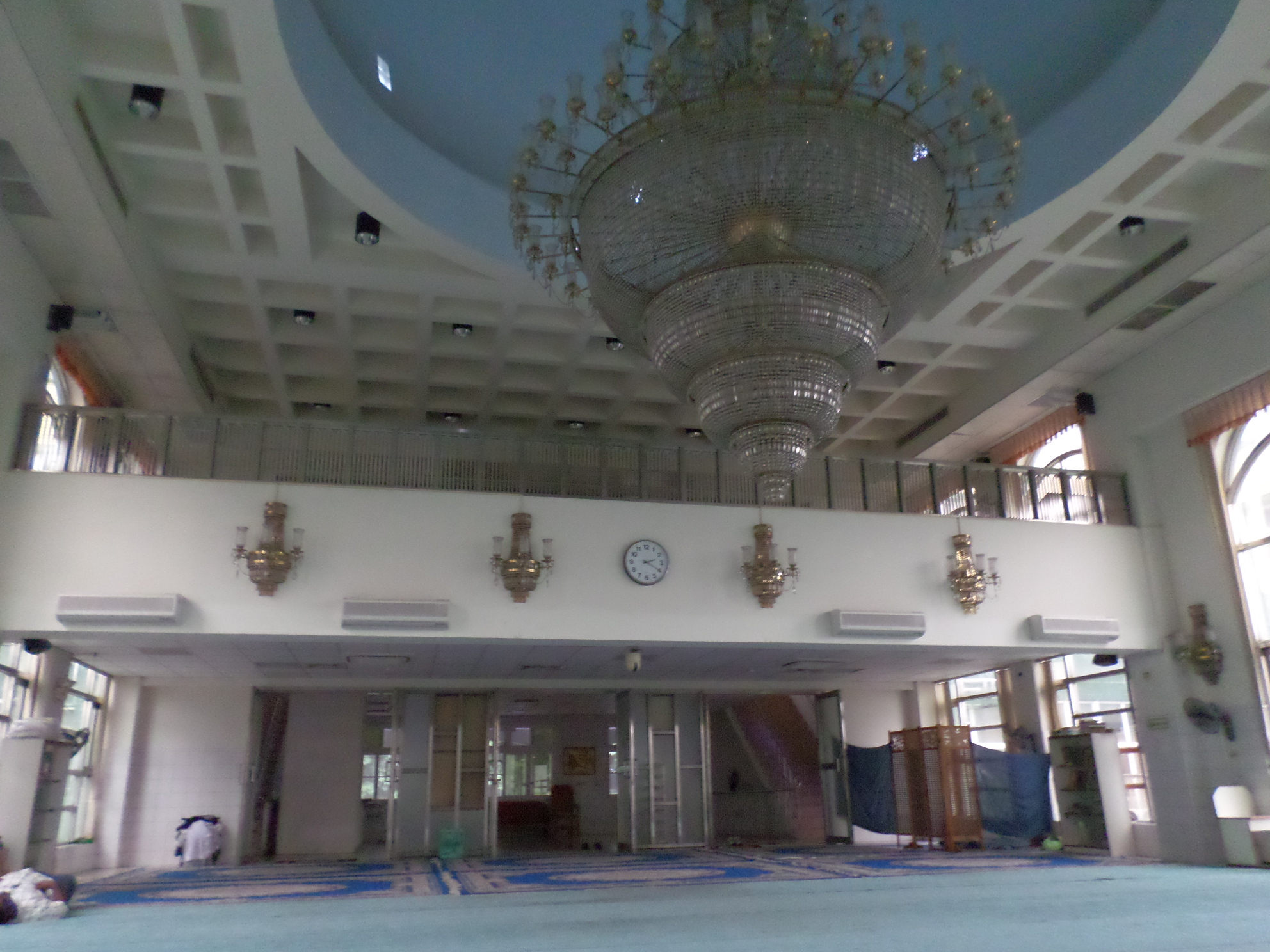
The mosque prayer hall, on Jianjun Road

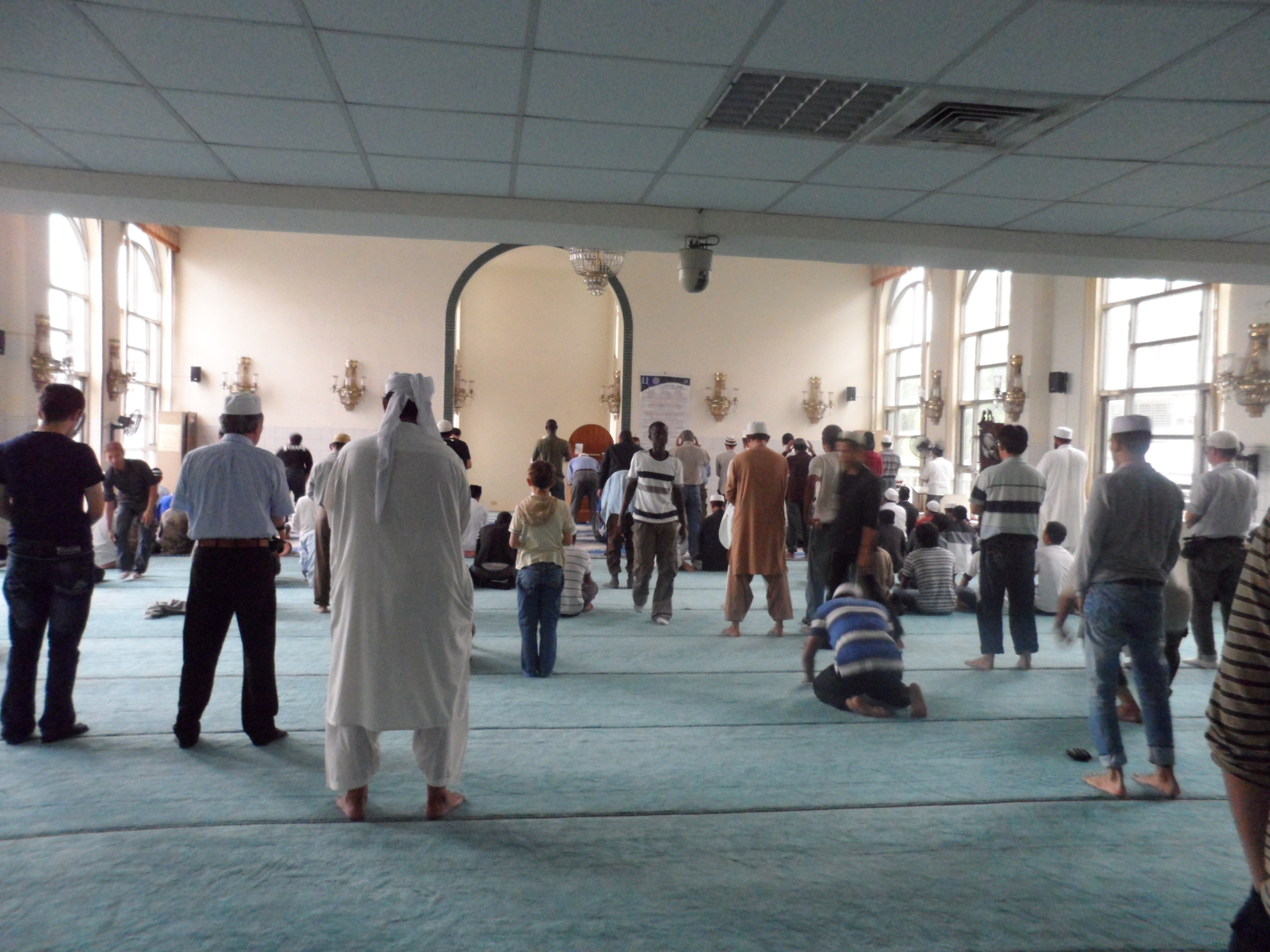
Friday prayer at the mosque, on Jianjun Road

== See also ==
- Islam in Taiwan
- List of mosques in Taiwan
