= Longgang Mosque =

Mosque in Zhongi, Taoyuan City, Taiwan

- 龍岡清真寺
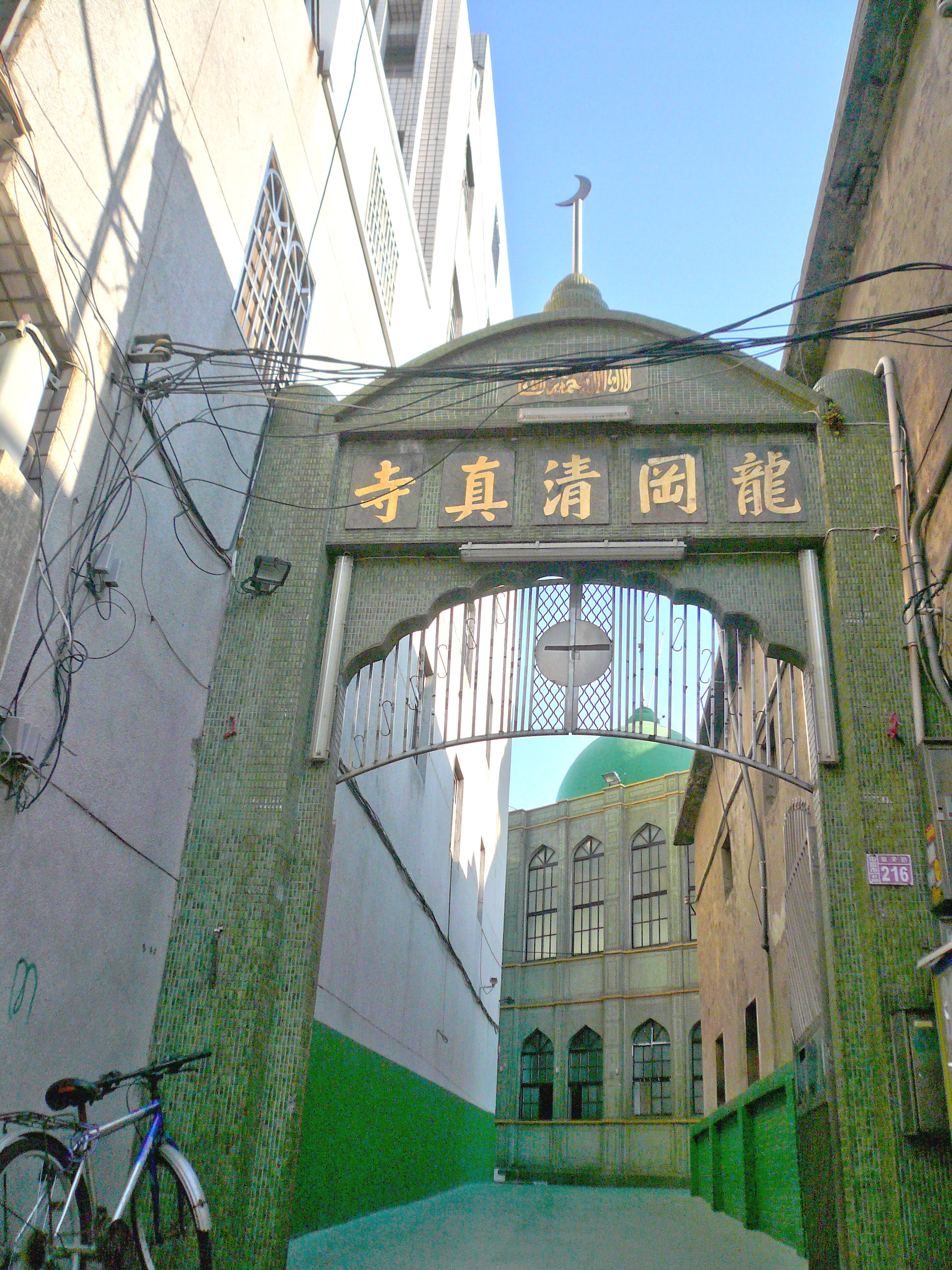
- The mosque dome visible through an iwan

- Location of the mosque in Taiwan

Religion
- Affiliation: Sunni Islam
- Ecclesiastical or organizational status: Mosque
- Status: Active

Location
- Location: 216 Long Dong Road, Zhongli, Taoyuan City
- Country: Taiwan
- Interactive map of Longgang Mosque
- Coordinates: 24°55′47″N 121°15′14″E

Architecture
- Type: Mosque
- Style: Islamic
- Completed: 1967 (original); 1989 (current)
- Construction cost: US$712,000

Specifications
- Capacity: 150 worshipers
- Dome: 1
- Site area: 1,300 m^{2} (14,000 sq ft)

Chinese name
- Traditional Chinese: 龍岡清真寺
- Simplified Chinese: 龙冈清真寺
Transcriptions
Standard Mandarin
- Hanyu Pinyin: Lónggāng Qīngzhēnsì

The Longgang Mosque (traditional Chinese: 龍岡清真寺; simplified Chinese: 龙冈清真寺; pinyin: Lónggāng Qīngzhēnsì), also known as the Lungkang Mosque, is a mosque in Zhongli District, Taoyuan City, Taiwan.

As of September 2008, the imam was Abdullah Liu (Chinese: 柳根榮; pinyin: Liǔ Gēnróng).

== History ==
In 1953, the UN General Assembly resolved to condemn the Taipei government for its actions and guerilla warfare inside Burma. Finally, an agreement was reached between Taipei, Rangoon, and Bangkok for evacuation of all Kuomintang Irregular forces under command of General Li Mi to Taiwan. Civil Air Transport transported 5,583 Kuomintang soldiers and 1,040 dependents to Taiwan. The majority of these guerrilla forces were Muslim and had no place to worship in their new Taiwan home and so they started to raise funds in 1964 to construct a mosque.

=== 1967 structure ===
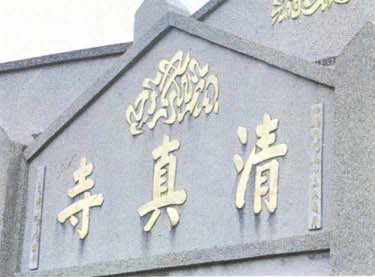
The first mosque structure

The original 1,289-square-metre (13,870 sq ft) mosque was built in 1967 by a group of 30 Muslims. After joining the Chinese Muslim Association in the early 1980s, the community raised money, including funds from the Kingdom of Saudi Arabia, to build a larger mosque.

=== 1989, current structure ===
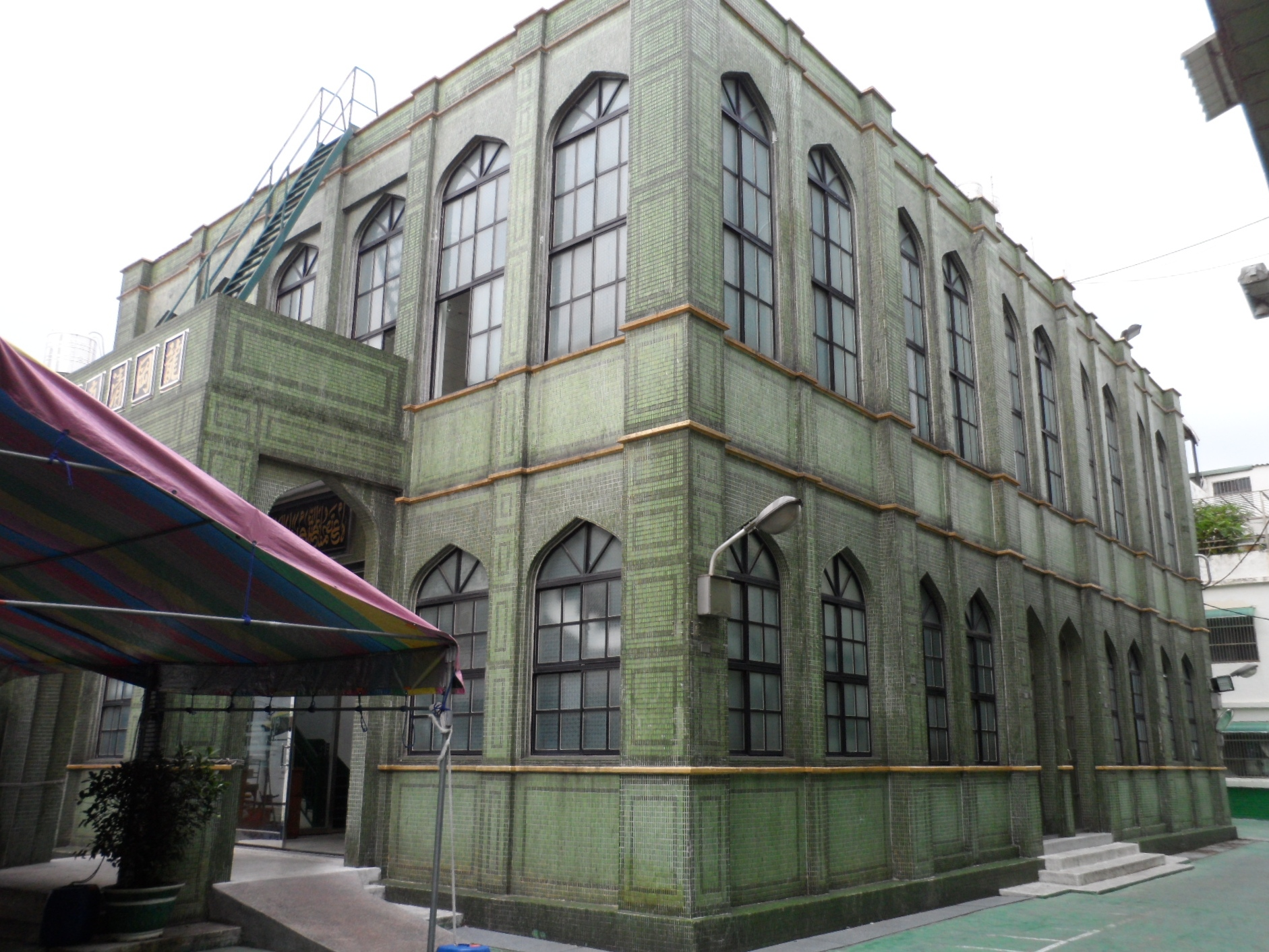
Longgang Mosque

To make a bigger mosque, the community purchased land on Longdong Road (Chinese: 龍東路) in Zhongli. At the US$312,000 initial development stage, only the main prayer hall and basement area of the mosque were built. The mosque building occupies an area of 1,300 square metres (14,000 sq ft) and the mosque's main worship area can hold 150 worshippers.

At the US$400,000 second development stage, the mosque's minarets, a kitchen, dormitory and shower room were added to the main building.

Due to the poor materials used to construct the building because of lack of funds, the mosque quickly deteriorated. After some discussion, a plan to reconstruct the mosque was finally put in place. With financial assistance from inside and outside Taiwan, the first reconstruction project for the mosque began in March 1988 and was completed in January 1989. The second reconstruction was completed in 1995; and on 15 November 2021, the opening ceremony of the new extension building of the Islamic-style mosque was held. The event was attended by Taoyuan Mayor Cheng Wen-tsan.

== Architecture ==
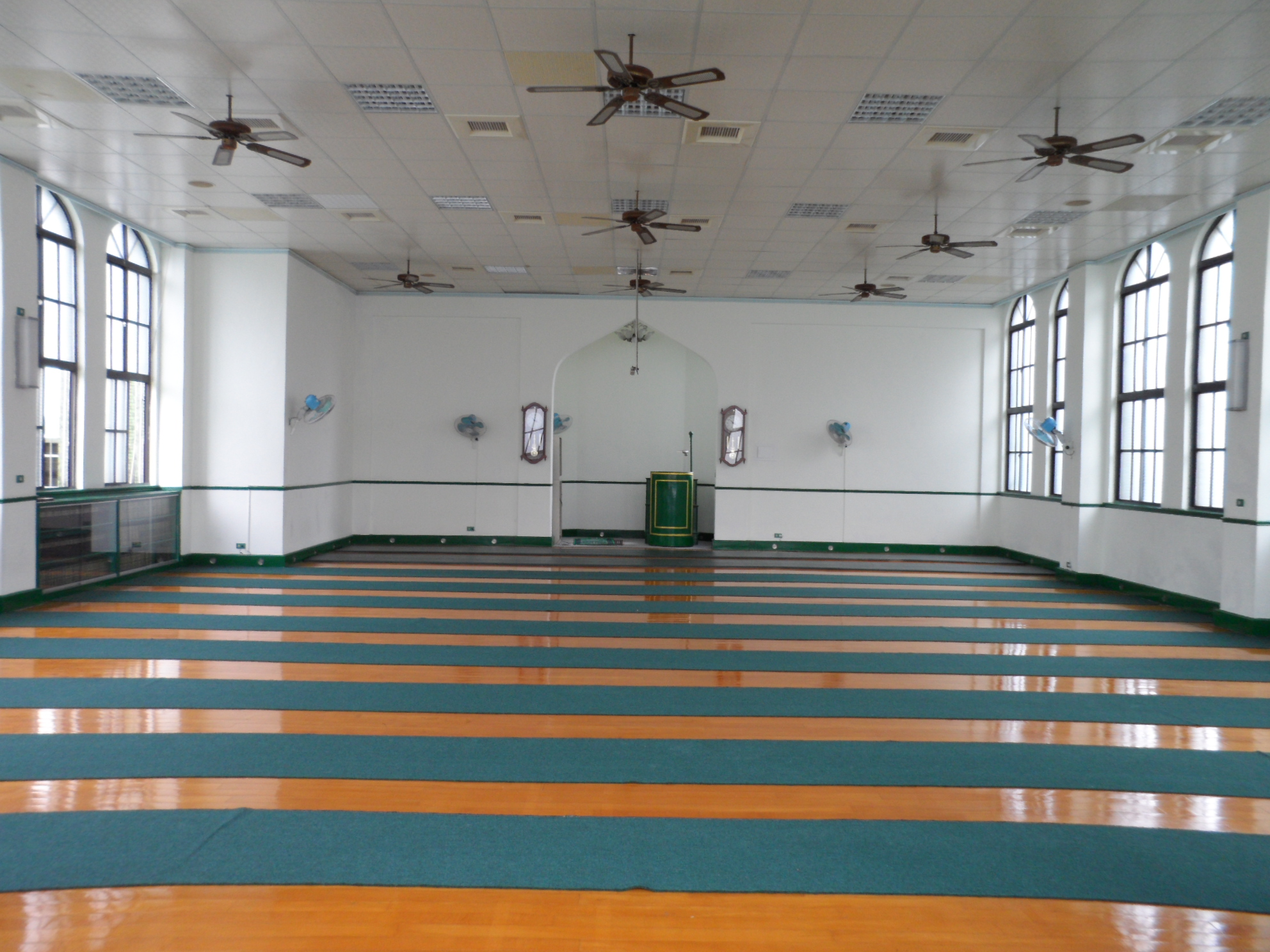
The mosque prayer hall

The Longgang Mosque is a green structure that has one prayer hall and it can accommodate approximately 150 worshipers. The other features of the building include the imam office, staff office, reception room, children chanting room, etc.

== Activities ==
By 2008, the population of Muslim faithful in Zhongli had reached 2,000. On weekends, and during winter and summer vacations, the mosque holds basic courses on Arabic and the Islamic faith to educate children about Islam.

== Transportation ==
Longgang Mosque is southeast of Zhongli Station of Taiwan Railway. In the future, the mosque will be served by Longgang Station of the Taoyuan Metro.

== See also ==
- Islam in Taiwan
- List of mosques in Taiwan
