= Chinese Muslim Association =

Religious organization based in Taipei, Taiwan

- 中國回教協會
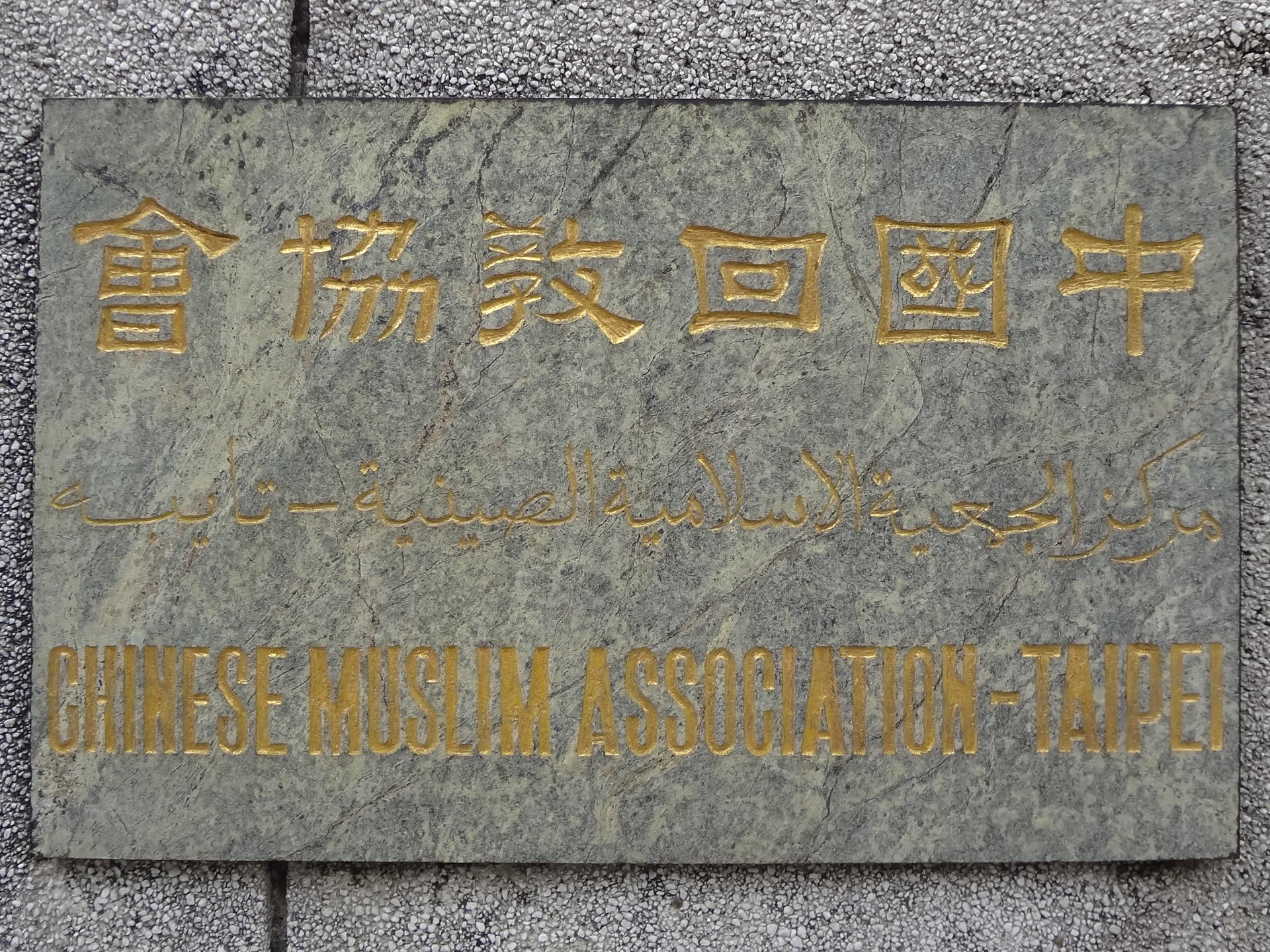
- Abbreviation: CMA
- Formation: 1938 (in Mainland China); 1958 (in Taiwan)
- Founded at: Wuhan
- Type: Religious organization
- Legal status: Operating
- Headquarters: Taipei Grand Mosque
- Location: Da'an, Taipei, Taiwan
- Key people: Salahuding Ma (Secretary-general)
- Website: Official website (in Chinese)

Chinese Muslim Association
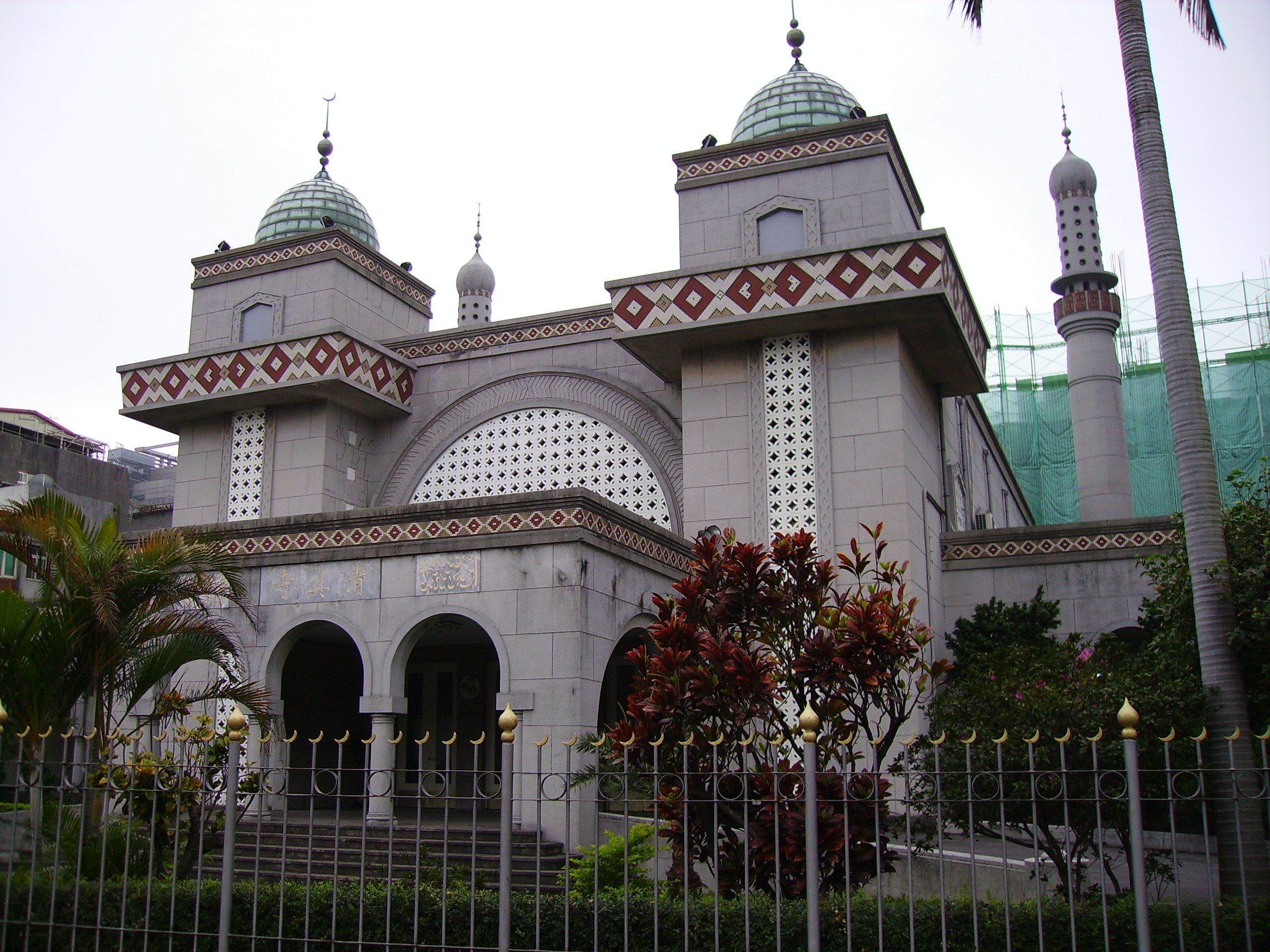
- Taipei Grand Mosque
- Traditional Chinese: 中國回教協會
- Simplified Chinese: 中国回教协会
Transcriptions
Standard Mandarin
- Hanyu Pinyin: Zhōngguó Huíjiào Xiéhuì
Southern Min
- Hokkien POJ: Tiong-kok Hôe-kàu Hia̍p-hōe
- Tâi-lô: Tiong-kok Huê-kàu Hia̍p-huē

The Chinese Muslim Association (Chinese: 中國回教協會; Arabic: الجمعية الإسلامية الصينية; CMA) is an organization of Chinese Muslims in the Republic of China (Taiwan). A rival group, the Chinese Muslim Youth League, competes with it in Taiwan.

== History ==
=== In mainland China ===
The Chinese Muslim Association was originally established in 1938 in Wuhan as Chinese Muslim Salvation Association (中國回民救國協會) with the sponsorship from Kuomintang. The organization was renamed to Muslim Association (回教救國協會) in 1939 and was changed to Chinese Muslim Association (中國回教協會) in 1942. After the handover of Taiwan from Japan to China in 1945, the CMA in Nanking appointed Chang Zichun (常子春), Wang Jingzhai and Zheng Houren (鄭厚仁) to form the preparatory committee of the CMA branch in Taiwan on 23 December 1947.

=== In Taiwan ===
In 1951 at the end of Chinese Civil War, the association evacuated mainland China with the Nationalist Government to Taiwan and settled there ever since. It was formally reestablished in 1958.

== Activities ==
The Chinese Muslim Association is the largest Islamic organization in Taiwan. The mosque also holds inter-religious workshops and debates between Islam and Confucianism, Catholicism and Buddhism to promote mutual understanding with other religions. It undertakes various activities across Taiwan such as volunteering, and Muslims view it in good standing. It also runs the Taipei Grand Mosque. Each mosque and its dealings are run by their own board of directors. Scholarships and discourses are arranged by its Foundation of Islamic Culture and Education.

CMA sponsors a weekly radio program beamed to mainland China by the Broadcasting Corporation of China. They supply reading materials for Muslims in the ROC Armed Forces.

Besides providing services for Muslims and helping to improve the welfare of Taiwan society, the association through their Overseas Affairs Commission also actively engages in cultural exchanges with Muslims in 46 countries around the world, many of which the ROC Government does not have any formal diplomatic relation with them. They also receive and entertain many foreign Muslim visitors to Taiwan.

CMA has been sending Taiwanese Muslim students overseas to receive formal Islamic education. To further improve the effort in preserving the Islamic faith among the Muslims, the association has developed a plan to "educating secular educators" and that the Bureau of Education of the Taipei City Government has approve the proposal to hold Islamic courses for primary and secondary school teachers during summer vacations. They also provide authentic Islamic information to public school teachers to eliminate the Islamic stereotyping and misunderstanding.

== List of CMA leaders ==
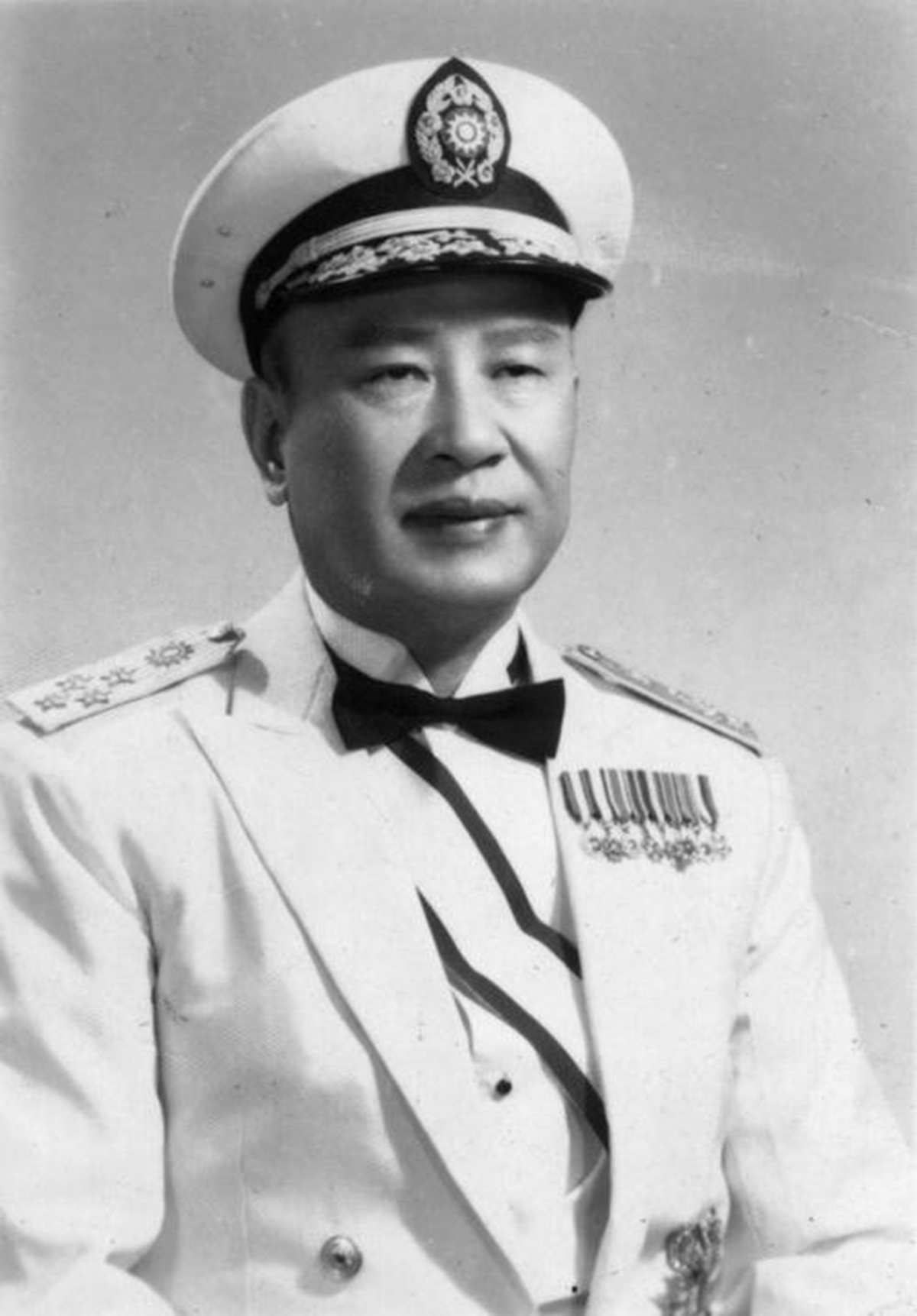
Bai Chongxi

List of CMA President:

- 1938-1959: Bai Chongxi
- 1959-1967: Shi Zizhou (時子周)
- 1967-1974: Chao Ming-yuan (acting)
- 1974-1990: Xu Xiaochu (許曉初)
- 1990-1996: Wu Huanhong (武宦宏)
- 1996-2002: Ma Jiazhen (馬家珍)
- 2002-2006: Ni Anguo (倪安國)
- 2006-2008: Ma Ruhu (馬如虎)
- 2008-: Dawood Cho Yong-tsing

== See also ==
- Chinese Islamic Cultural and Educational Foundation
- Chinese Muslim Youth League
- Islam in Taiwan
- Islamic Association of China
- List of mosques in Taiwan
- Taiwan Halal Integrity Development Association
