= Taiwan Halal Center =

Organization based in Xinyi, Taipei, Taiwan

- 臺灣清真推廣中心

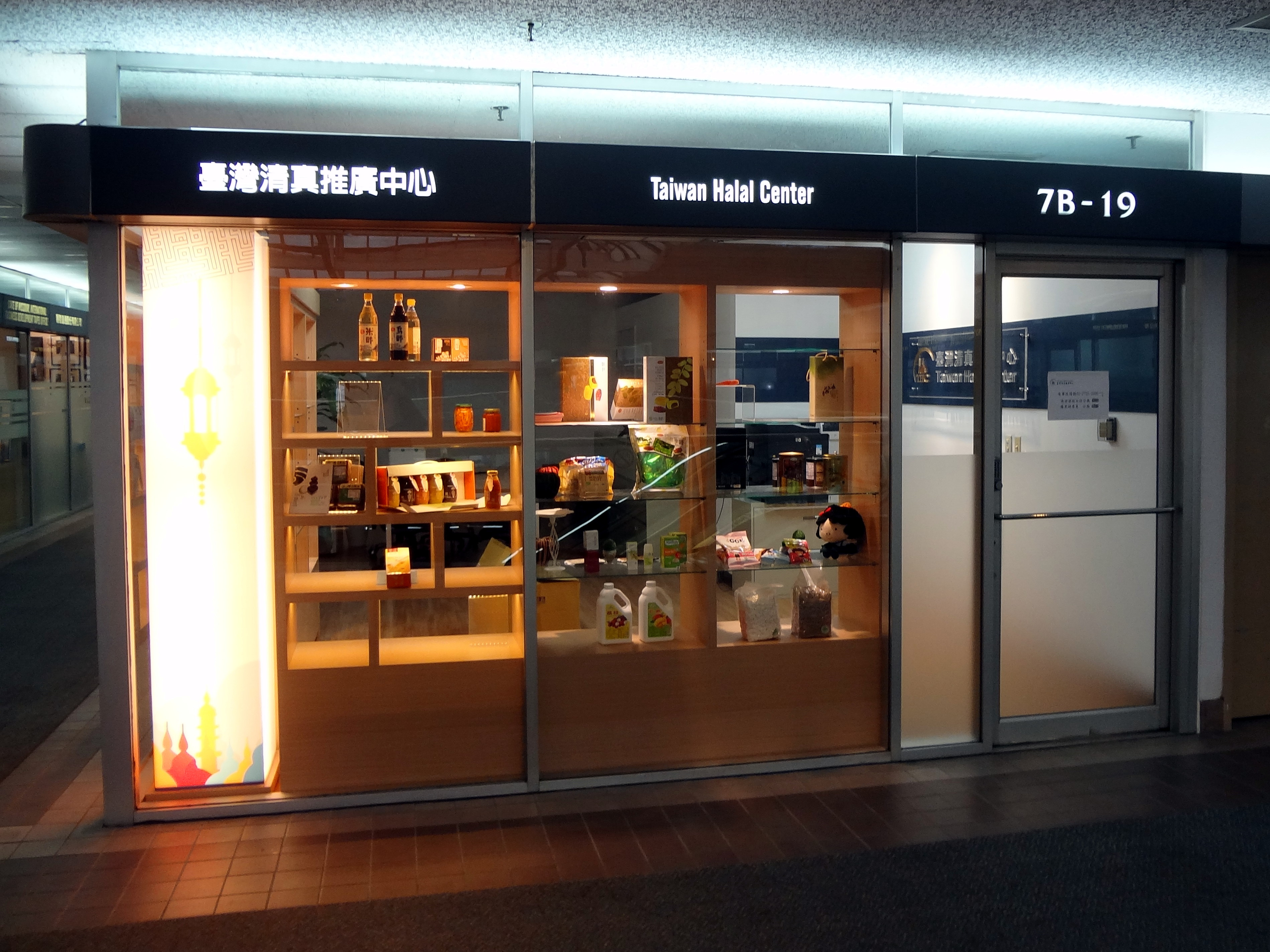
- Formation: 21 April 2017
- Founder: Taiwan External Trade Development Council
- Headquarters: Taipei World Trade Center
- Location: Xinyi, Taipei, Taiwan
- Parent organization: Taiwan External Trade Development Council
- Website: Official website

The Taiwan Halal Center (THC; traditional Chinese: 臺灣清真推廣中心; simplified Chinese: 台湾清真推广中心; pinyin: Táiwān Qīngzhēn Tuīguǎng Zhōngxīn) is an organization that promotes the Halal industry in Taiwan.

== History ==
The organization was established by Taiwan External Trade Development Council on 21 April 2017 in Taipei. It is part of the New Southbound Policy.

== Awards ==
The organization won a Malaysia Tourism Council gold award on 31 October 2018.

== See also ==
- Islam in Taiwan
- Taiwan Halal Integrity Development Association
