= Taipei Cultural Mosque =

Mosque in Zhongzheng, Taipei, Taiwan

- 台北文化清真寺
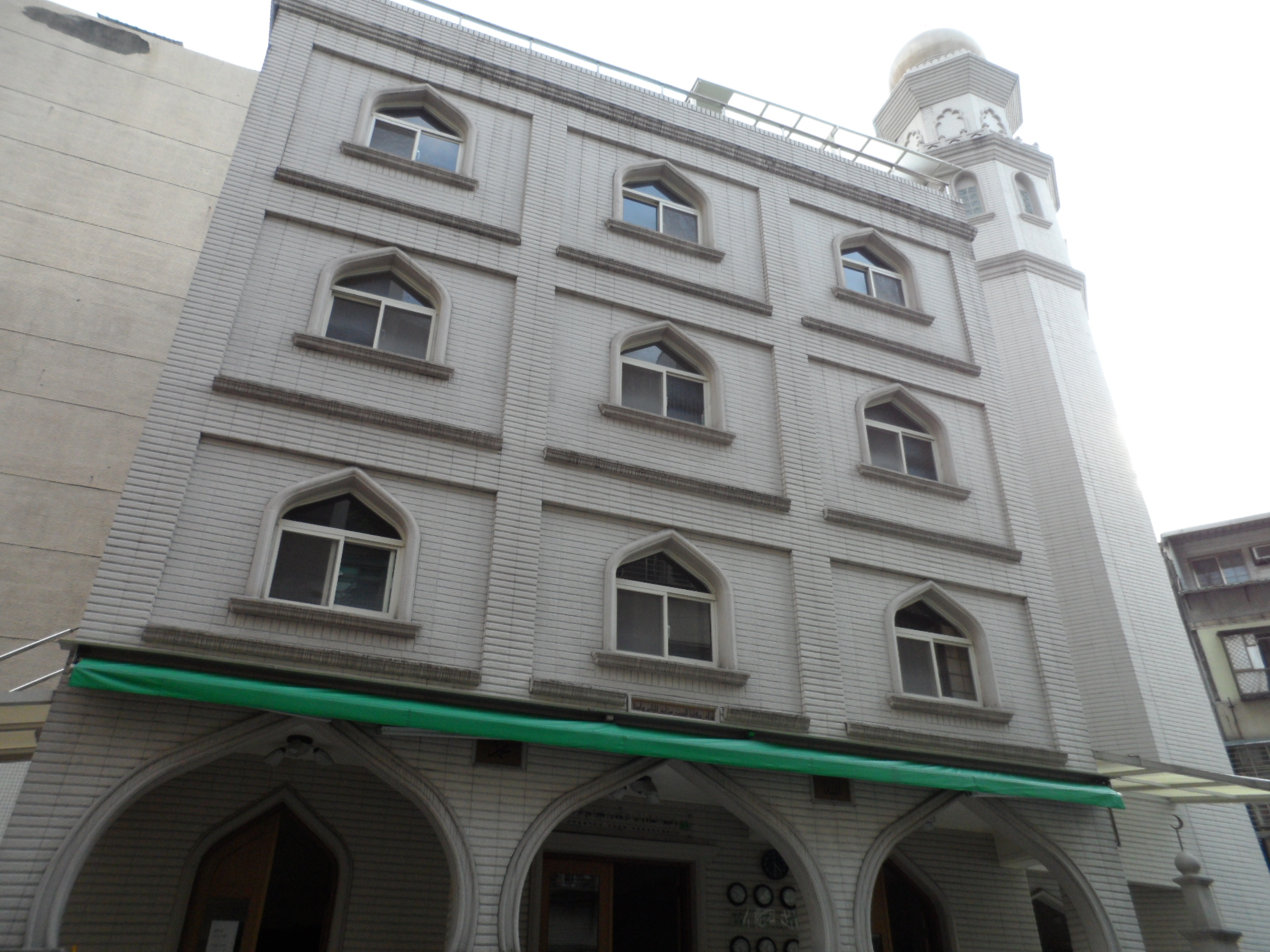

- Location of the mosque in Taipei

Religion
- Affiliation: Sunni Islam
- Ecclesiastical or organizational status: Mosque
- Governing body: Chinese Muslim Youth League
- Status: Active

Location
- Location: 3, Lane 25, Sec. 1, Xinhai Road, Zhongzheng, Taipei
- Country: Taiwan
- Interactive map of Taipei Cultural Mosque
- Coordinates: 25°1′10″N 121°31′41″E

Architecture
- Architect: Huang Mo-chun (1982)
- Type: Mosque
- Completed: 1950 (original); 1982 (current)
- Minaret: 1

Chinese name
- Traditional Chinese: 台北文化清真寺
Transcriptions
Standard Mandarin
- Hanyu Pinyin: Táiběi Wénhuà Qīngzhēnsì

The Taipei Cultural Mosque (Chinese: 台北文化清真寺; pinyin: Táiběi Wénhuà Qīngzhēnsì) is a mosque in Zhongzheng District, in the city of Taipei, Taiwan. It is the third mosque built in Taiwan and it is owned by the Chinese Muslim Youth League. The building also houses the Taiwan Halal Integrity Development Association.

== History ==
=== 1950 structure ===
The first Taipei Cultural Mosque was built in 1950 at Roosevelt Road by imam Xiao Yongtai (蕭永泰) or Akhond Hsiao from Northwest China. The mosque was initially located at Xiao's Japanese-style house. His main thought was to spread Islam through cultural movement, thus he also reestablished the Chinese Muslim Youth League. Due to the road widening scheme on Roosevelt Road, the mosque demolished in c. 1982.

=== 1982 structure ===
The new Taipei Cultural Mosque was completed in 1982, designed by architect Huang Mo-chun. The new mosque went through several renovations and was rebuilt into its current five-story building in 1983. The mosque was inaugurated during a ceremony attended by the Saudi Ambassador to the Republic of China, Asaad Abdul Aziz AI-Zuhair.

In 1990, Xiao died and his son, Xiao Weijun (蕭偉君) assumed the imam position previously occupied by his father. Another renovation was made again in the same year with the help of Indonesia Economic and Trade Office to Taipei, and the latest renovation was made in April 2010.

== Architecture ==
The five-storey mosque is a combination of Islamic traditional culture and modern architecture. The building has become a centre for religious and cultural activities for Muslims in Taiwan.

== Activities ==
The building serves as the headquarters of Chinese Muslim Youth League and the Taiwan Halal Integrity Development Association.

== Transportation ==
The mosque is within walking distance South from Taipower Building Station of Taipei Metro.

== See also ==
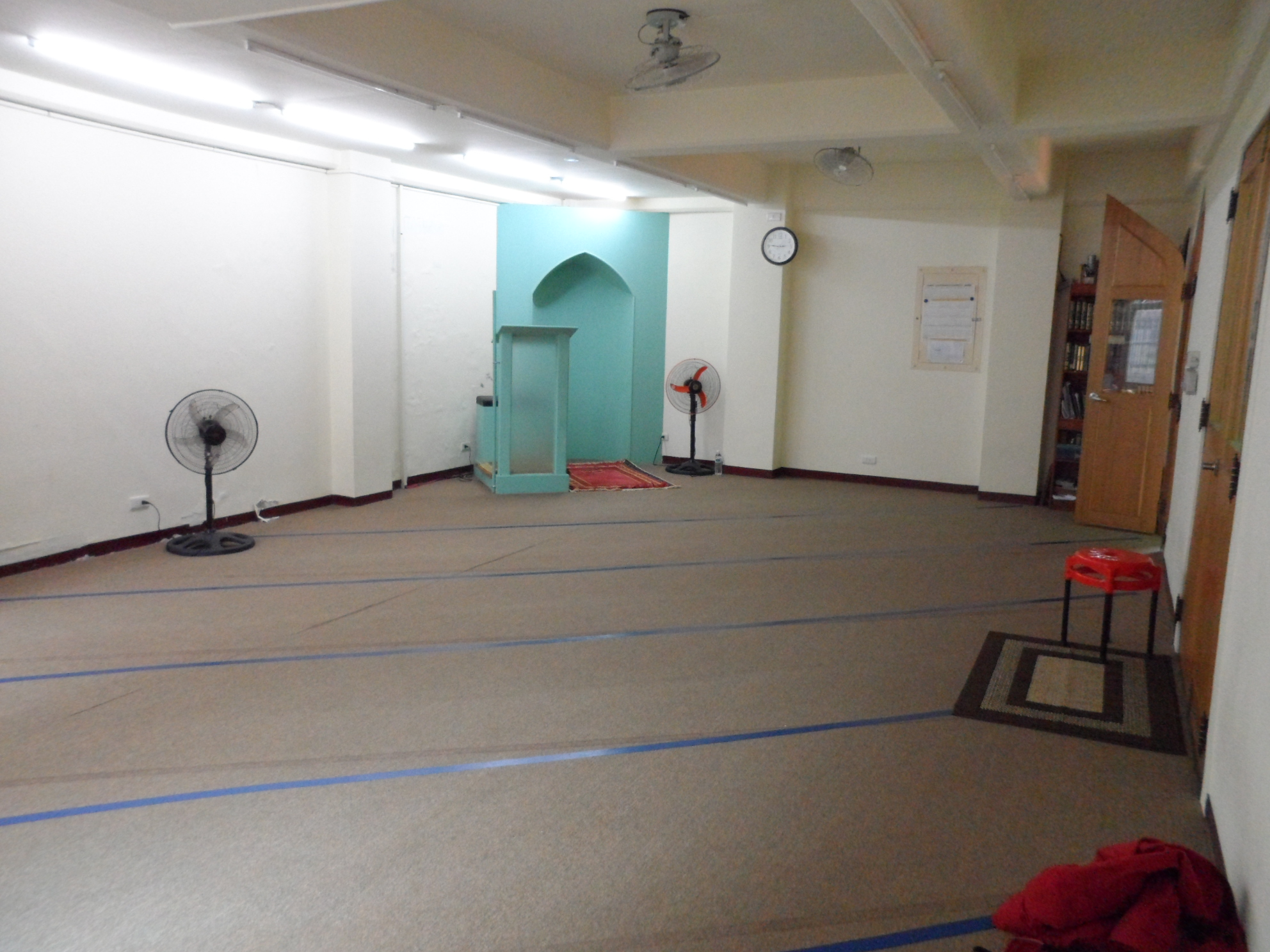
The prayer hall

- Islam in Taiwan
- List of mosques in Taiwan
