= Taipei Grand Mosque =

Mosque in Da'an, Taipei, Taiwan

- 台北清真寺
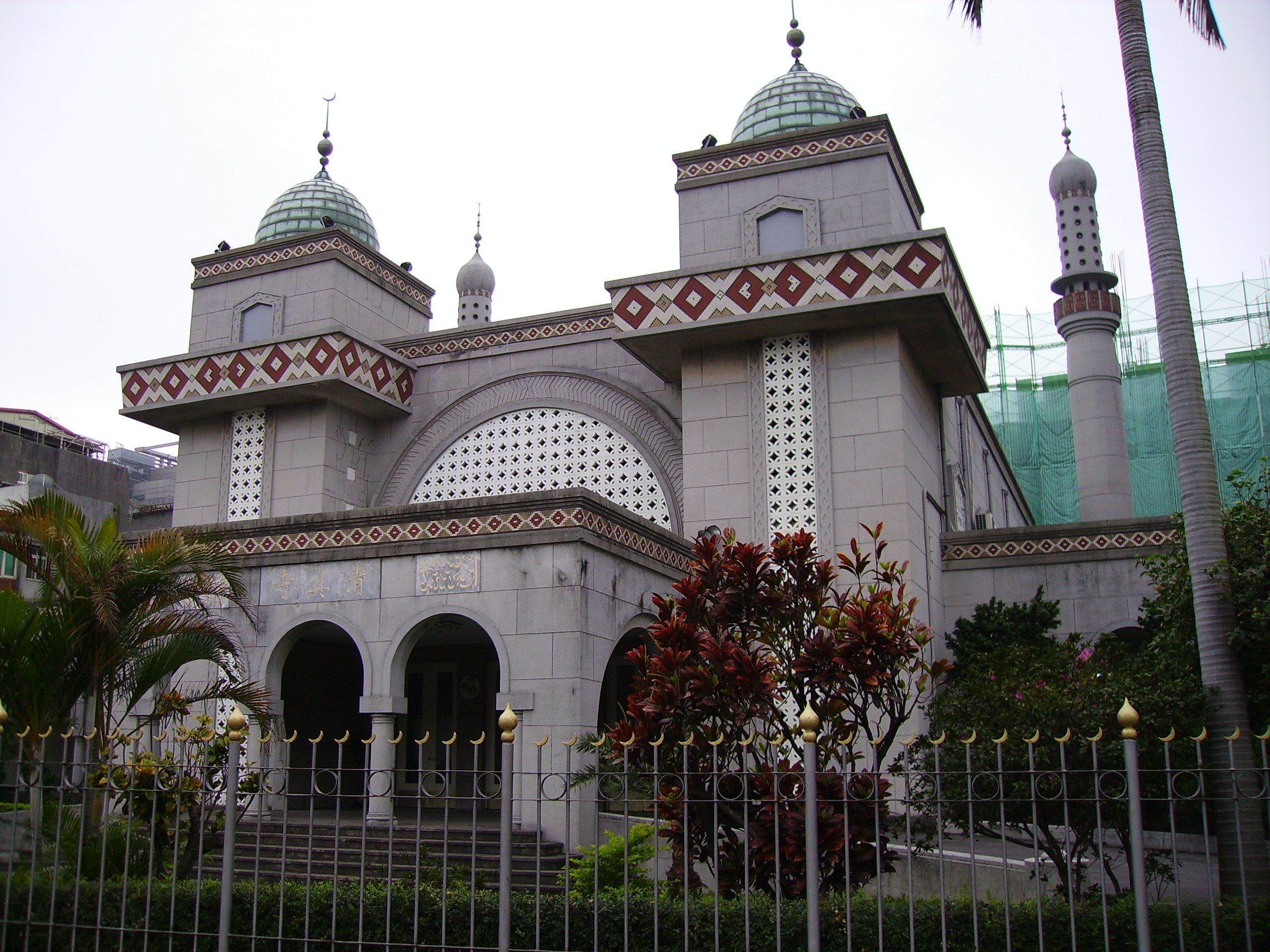

- Location of the mosque in Taipei

Religion
- Affiliation: Sunni Islam
- Ecclesiastical or organizational status: Mosque
- Governing body: Chinese Muslim Association
- Leadership: Imam Omar Ayash (歐馬)
- Status: Active

Location
- Location: 62, Sec. 2, Xing Sheng South Road, Da'an, Taipei
- Country: Taiwan
- Interactive map of Taipei Grand Mosque
- Coordinates: 25°1′41″N 121°32′3″E

Architecture
- Architect: Yang Cho-cheng (1960)
- Type: Mosque
- Style: Islamic; Neo-Byzantine; Neoclassical
- General contractor: Continental Engineering Corporation (1960)
- Completed: 1948 (original); 1960 (current)
- Construction cost: US$250,000

Specifications
- Capacity: 1,000 worshipers
- Length: 15 m (49 ft)
- Width: 15 m (49 ft)
- Interior area: 2,747 m^{2} (29,570 sq ft)
- Dome: 2
- Dome height (outer): 15 m (49 ft)
- Dome dia. (outer): 15 m (49 ft)
- Minaret: 2
- Minaret height: 20 m (66 ft)
- Materials: Bricks; stone; copper; brass; mosaic tiles

Website
- taipeimosque.org.tw (in Chinese)

Chinese name
- Traditional Chinese: 台北清真寺
Transcriptions
Standard Mandarin
- Hanyu Pinyin: Táiběi Qīngzhēnsì
Southern Min
- Hokkien POJ: Tâi-pak Chheng-chin-sī

The Taipei Grand Mosque (Chinese: 台北清真寺; pinyin: Táiběi Qīngzhēnsì; Pe̍h-ōe-jī: Tâi-pak Chheng-chin-sī), abbreviated as TGM, and also known as the Taipei Zheng He Mosque (Chinese: 台北鄭和清真寺; pinyin: Táiběi Zhèng Hé Qīngzhēnsì; Pe̍h-ōe-jī: Tâi-pak Tēⁿ Hô Chheng-chin-sī) is a mosque located in the Da'an District of Taipei City, in Taiwan. It is the largest and oldest mosque in Taiwan and its most important Islamic structure.

As of November 2025, the imam at the mosque was Abdullah Cheng.

== History ==
=== 1948 structure ===
After the handover of Taiwan from Japan to China in 1945, the Chinese Muslim Association (CMA) in Nanking appointed Chang Zichun (常子春), Wang Jingzhai (王靜齋) and Zheng Houren (鄭厚仁) to form the preparatory committee of the CMA branch in Taiwan on 23 December 1947.

Later, since many Chinese Muslims that came to Taiwan could not find any place to pray, they raised money to build the very first mosque in Taiwan. They built the mosque at No. 2, Lane 17, Lishui Street (麗水街), Da'an District, Taipei City by converting a Japanese-style house into a 992-square-metre (10,680 sq ft) prayer area. The land was donated by Chang Tze-chun and Cheng Hou-ren. Muslims from Mainland China started to pray in that mosque in August 1948. With the growing number of Chinese Muslims with the KMT government, the mosque suddenly became too small to accommodate the growing number of worshipers, therefore they had to look for a new bigger place to rebuild the mosque.

No. 2, Lane 17, Lishui Street now houses an apartment building.

=== 1960 structure ===
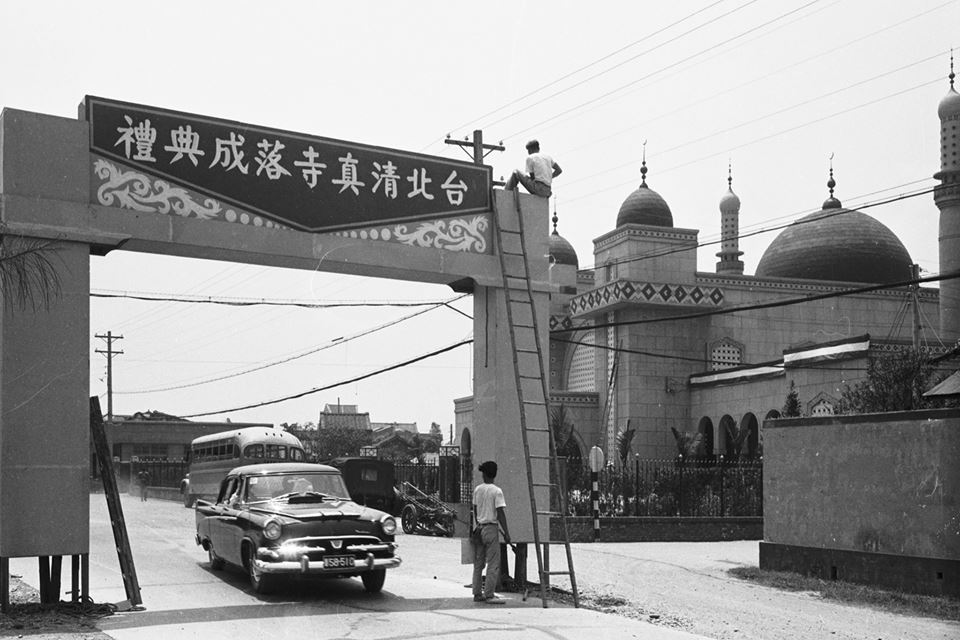
Opening ceremony of Taipei Grand Mosque new and current building

In the latter part of the 1950s after the end of Chinese Civil War and the relocation of the Nationalist Government from Mainland China to Taiwan, Director-General of the CMA Bai Chongxi and ROC Minister of Foreign Affairs George Yeh proposed the construction of a bigger Islamic-style mosque which was designed by the famous architect Yang Cho-cheng. Under the leader Bai Chongxi, director-general Shi Zizhou (時子周) and the board chairman Chang Zixuan (常子萱), the mosque was constructed by the Continental Engineering Corporation on a 2,747-square-metre (29,570 sq ft) site on Xinsheng South Street (新生南路), donated by the government. ROC Vice President Chen Cheng led the inauguration ceremony on 13 April 1960.

The construction cost was covered by the CMA with funding of NT$150,000 from the Shah of Iran and King of Jordan, NT$100,000 loaned by the Kuomintang government and a loan from the Bank of Taiwan. The congregation had repaid half of the bank loan by that time when the ROC government decided to exempt them from having to repay the remaining.

The mosque has strong ties to Saudi Arabia which continues to provide financial support to the mosque. Visiting Saudi Imams come to preach at the mosque during Ramadan. In 1971 the mosque was visited by King Faisal. The mosque has been visited by other heads of states, such as Jordian King Hussein, the Malaysian Prime Minister Tunku Abdul Rahman, and many other prominent Muslim leaders.

In 1999, the mosque faced a risk of demolition to due a land dispute with a cement company. It was reported that the cement company declared ownership of land where the mosque is located. They attempted to dismantle the mosque in order to reclaim the land. However, concerned legislators of the area and the Taipei City Government under Mayor Ma Ying-jeou, turned the mosque into a historic building on 29 June 1999 in order to preserve diverse cultural development. The mosque board still had to solve the land dispute.

Speaking at the mosque in December 2001 during Eid al-Fitr, Mayor Ma thanked the Indonesian workers for their contribution to Taiwan and gave them a festive greeting. The mayor was spotted wearing a Jinnah cap while greeting the workers and spoke some Bahasa Indonesia. He cited that 20,000 of the 36,000 foreign workers in Taipei were Indonesians, who had contributed much to the construction and household assistance of Taipei City. He also said that if all of those workers took the same day off, one-quarter of the city would be paralyzed.

On 25 December 2015, vice presidential candidate Wang Ju-hsuan visited the mosque as part of her election campaign. In 2018, the mosque was renovated at an estimated cost of NT$31 million, in which NT$15.2 million of it will be borne by the Department of Cultural Affairs of Taipei City Government. The renovation is divided into two phases and it was expected to be completed by May 2023. On 29 September 2020, Chunghwa Post released stamps featuring Taipei Grand Mosque and Taichung Mosque with denomination of NT$15 and NT$28 respectively.

== Architecture ==
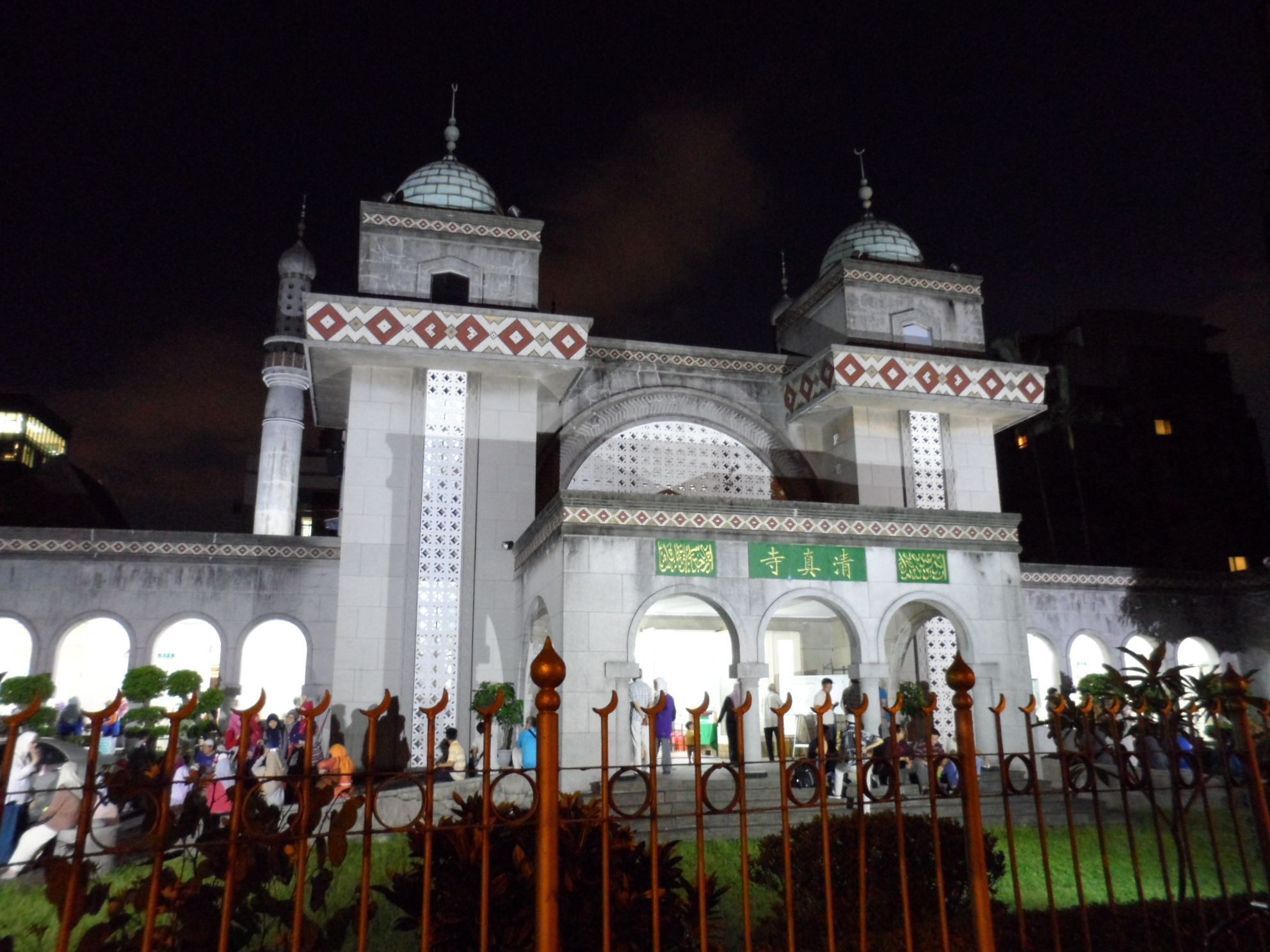
The mosque at night, in 2013

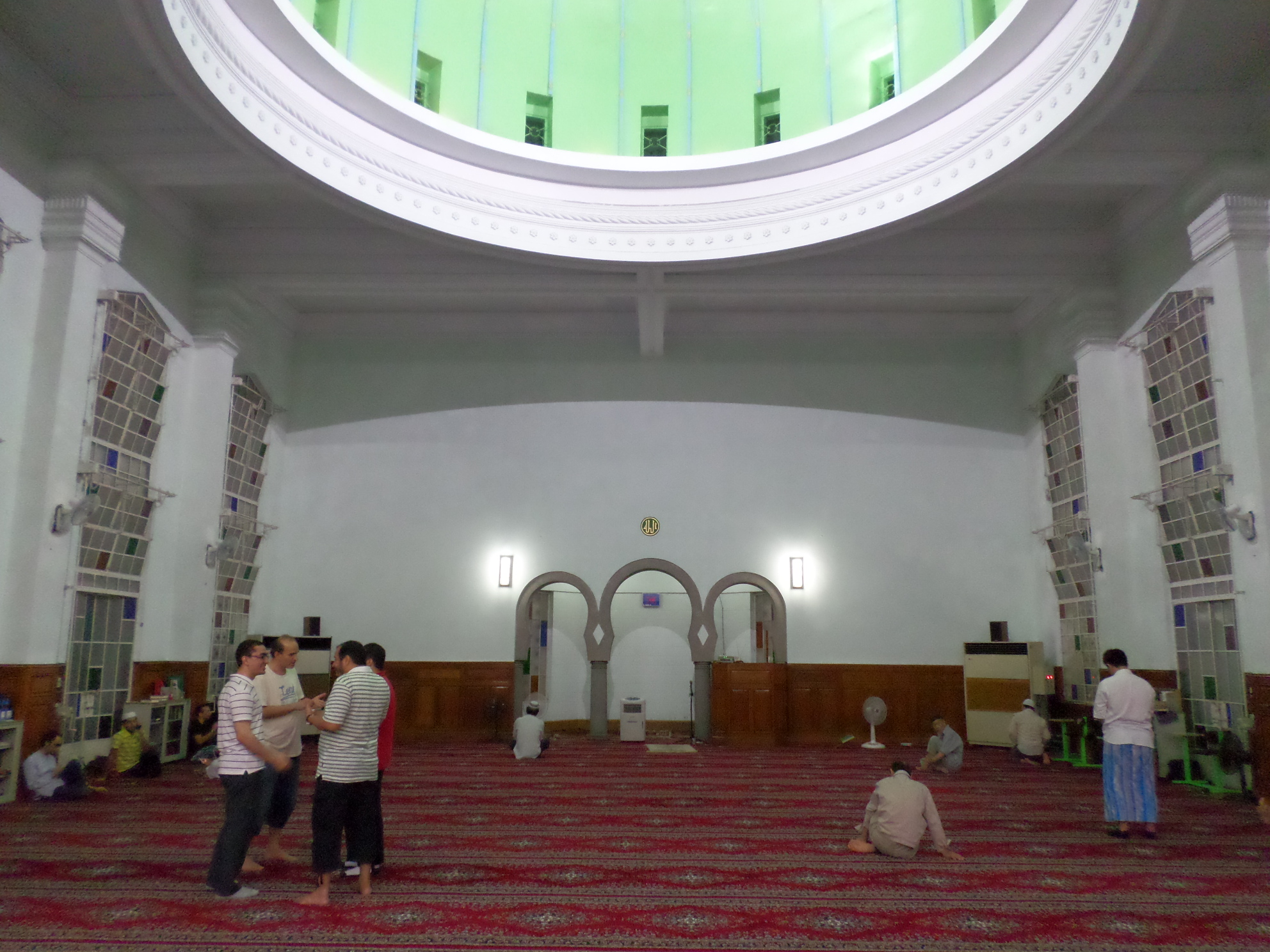
The prayer hall, in 2012

The Taipei Grand Mosque was built in the Islamic architectural style. It was designed by architect Yang Cho-cheng, the same architect that designed the Taipei Grand Hotel, Chiang Kai-shek Memorial Hall, National Theater and Concert Hall and many other landmark buildings in Taiwan.

The mosque has an enormous greenish-bronze domed roof that is 15 metres (49 ft) high, has a diameter of 15 metres (49 ft), is supported entirely without beams, and is wrapped in brass. Oxidation has turned the dome from spangle to verdigris over time. The dome has two Neo-Byzantine style onion-shaped-spires. Crescent decorations sit at the tip of the spires and at the iron railings.

The mosque also has two 20-metre-tall (66 ft) minarets, located at both ends of the building. The minarets are grey in color with a red-colored neck and an onion-shaped spire on top. The design uses a blend of Taiwanese and Central Asian materials.

It is the largest mosque in Taiwan with a total area of 2,747 square metres (29,570 sq ft) and an expansive prayer hall that is both 15 metres (49 ft) wide and long. The hall was built according to Islamic traditions and there is Islamic geometric art on the windowpanes. It can accommodate up to 1,000 worshippers and is adorned with handmade Persian rugs and chandeliers, presented by kings of countries friendly to the ROC. Initially, the prayer hall was located on the ground floor of the mosque. Due to the increasing number of Muslims attending prayers, a second floor was added above the main prayer hall floor to accommodate the female worshipers.

Surrounding the main prayer hall are colonnades completed in a mix of Neoclassical and Neo-Byzantine style. The mosque corridors are filled with corbel arches that extend to both ends. The width and height of the column of the arches is harmoniously proportional. The square pegs of the arches are smoothed with round edges. Outer walls of the mosque are made of brick and cut stone, decorated with mosaic tiles. Other facilities include a reception hall, prayer hall, side arcades, administrative offices, library, reposing room and ablution rooms. There are two Arabian date palm trees located at the mosque front yard garden.

== Activities ==
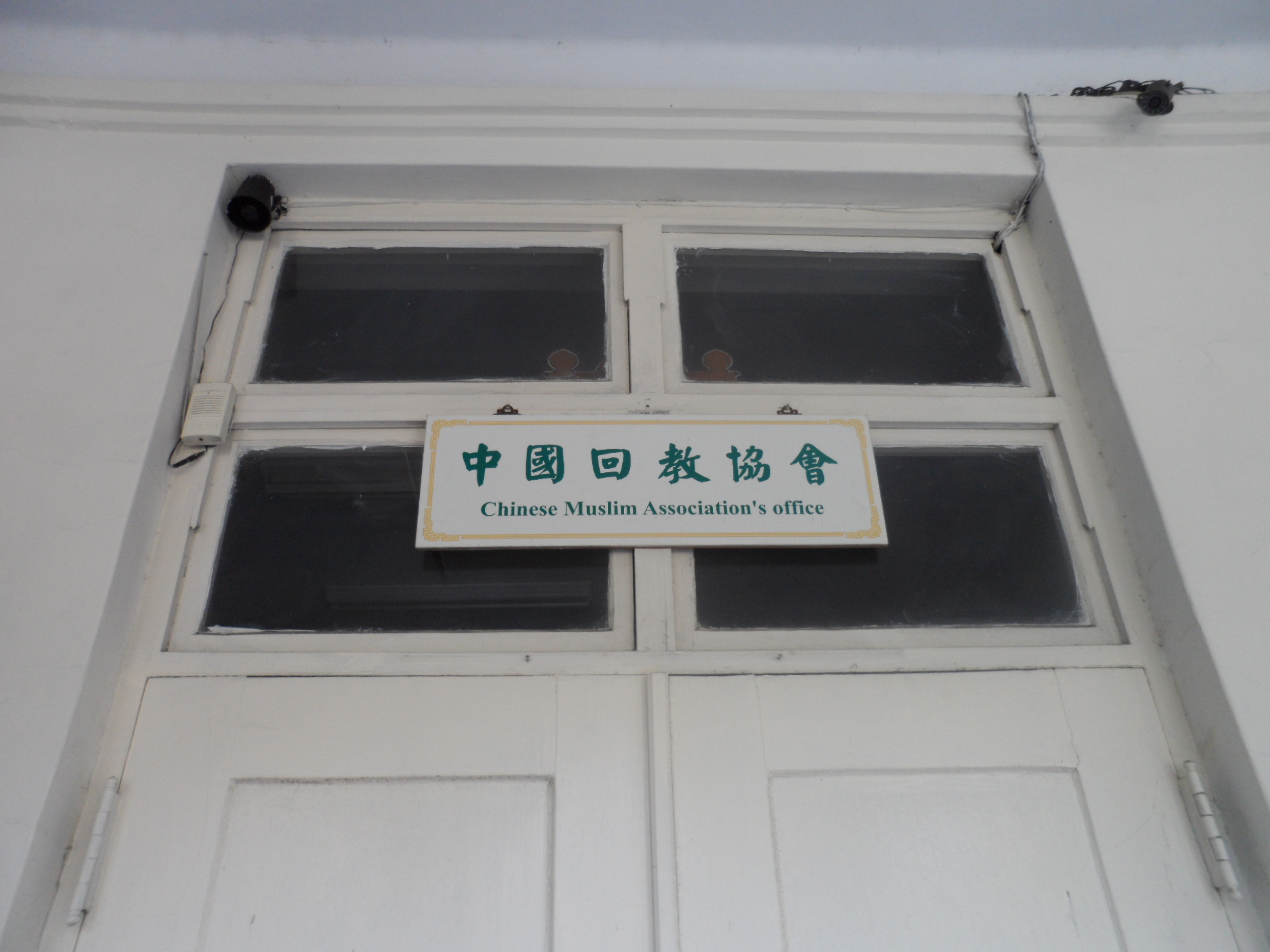
Office of the Chinese Muslim Association in the mosque

The mosque is a place for Muslims to perform their five daily prayers, including the Friday prayer, Eid prayers, Tarawih prayers in the evening during Ramadan, and funeral prayers.

The mosque houses the headquarters of the Chinese Muslim Association, the largest Islamic organization in Taiwan. The mosque also houses the Chinese Islamic Cultural and Educational Foundation.

The mosque has its own board of directors who are responsible for the affairs of the mosque; and it has its own active volunteer organization called the Islamic Volunteer Corp., created in 1995. This organization organizes volunteers to perform Islamic services. Currently the organization has more than 70 volunteers who have helped the mosque to perform Islamic services.

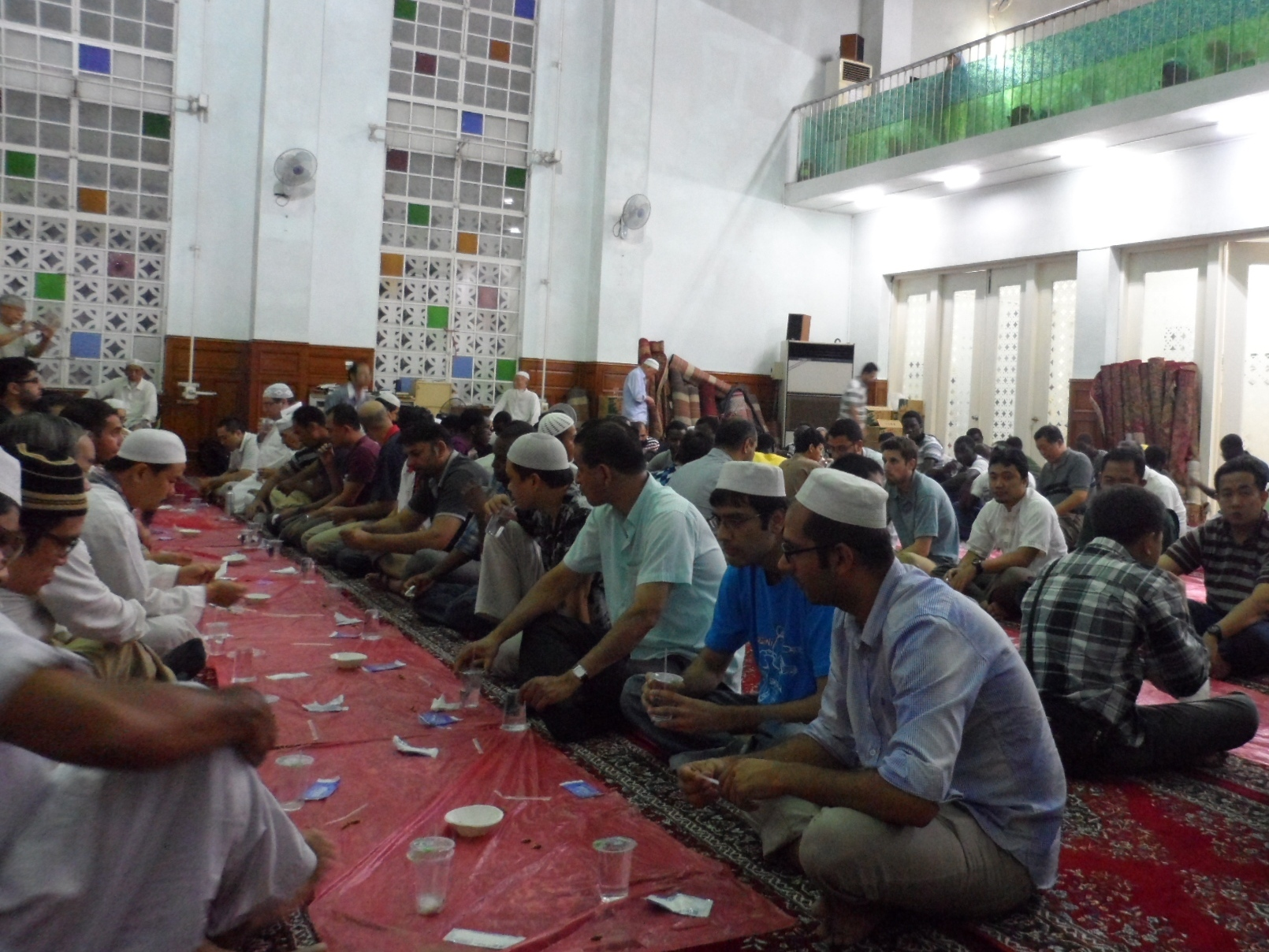
Breaking of the fast at the mosque during Ramadan

The mosque receives private donations to run most of its activities and cover daily operating costs, and sometimes seek subsidies from local government agencies. Organizations such as the Muslim World League and World Assembly of Muslim Youth have assisted at various times.

Due to the absence of any formal Islamic education institution in Taiwan, the mosque holds some Islamic courses, such as Arabic language, Quran and Hadith teaching and Sharia. Many course are held during weekends. During Ramadan, local and foreign Muslims hold their fast break at the mosque. Simple food such as dates and mineral water are generally served from donations collected during Ramadan to break their fast, followed by a full dinner served by the mosque committees and volunteers.

In April 2001, during the mosque's 41st anniversary, the mosque opened its door to the public for exhibitions. The Vice-Imam of the mosque, Ishag Ma (馬孝棋), said that the event is a cultural celebration and an invitation to Taiwanese who no longer practice their Muslim faith, including those who live in Lukang Township in Changhua County.

The mosque hosts visits by students of other faiths to learn about Islam. The mosque also holds inter-religious workshops and debates between Islam and Confucianism, Catholicism, and Buddhism to promote mutual understanding with other religions.

After his death on 31 July 2017, the body of Liu Wen-hsiung, a People First Party Muslim legislator, was sent to Taipei Grand Mosque where a funeral prayer was performed, followed by his burial.

== Transportation ==
The mosque is accessible within walking distance south of Daan Park Station of Taipei Metro.

== See also ==
- Islam in Taiwan
- List of mosques in Taiwan
