= Taiwan Halal Integrity Development Association =

Religious organization based in Zhongzheng, Taipei, Taiwan

- 台灣清真產業品質保證推廣協會
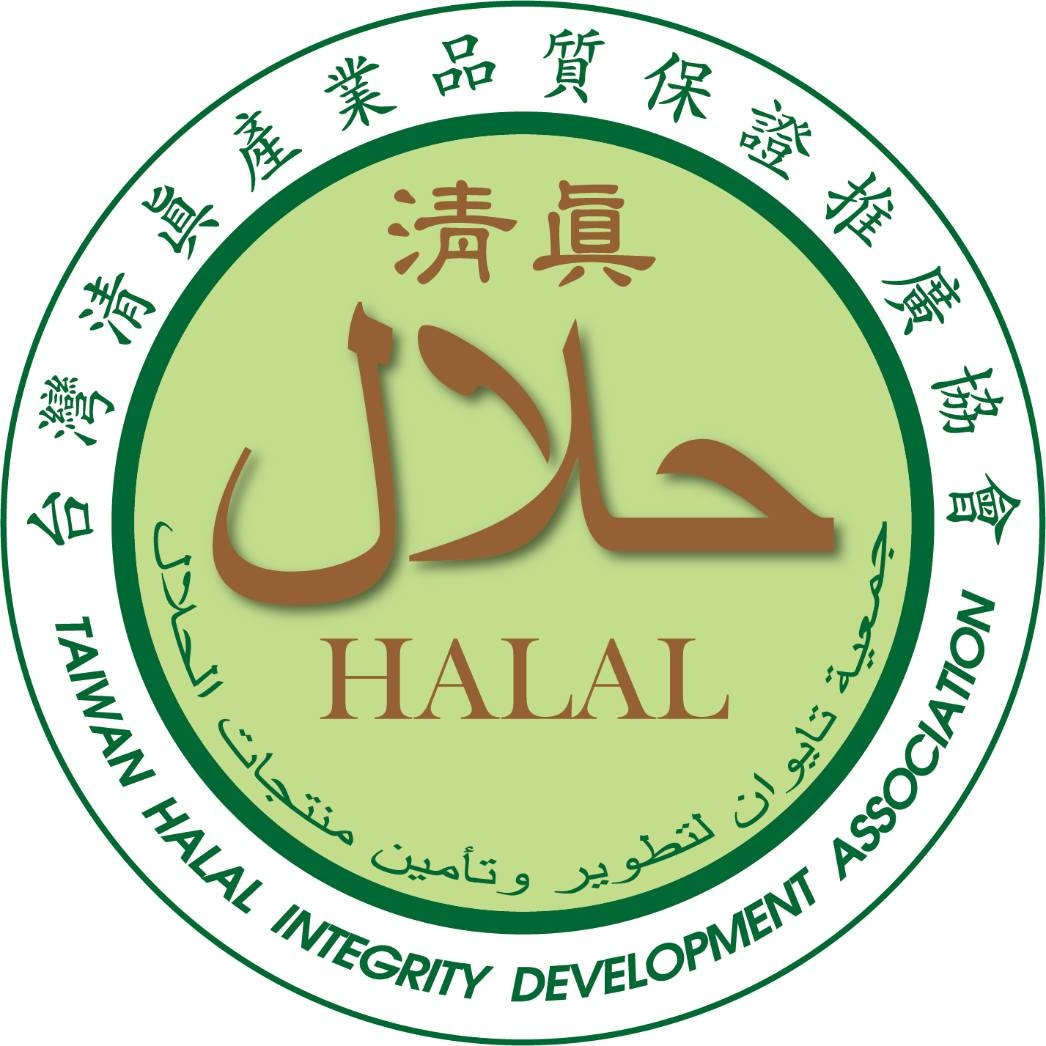

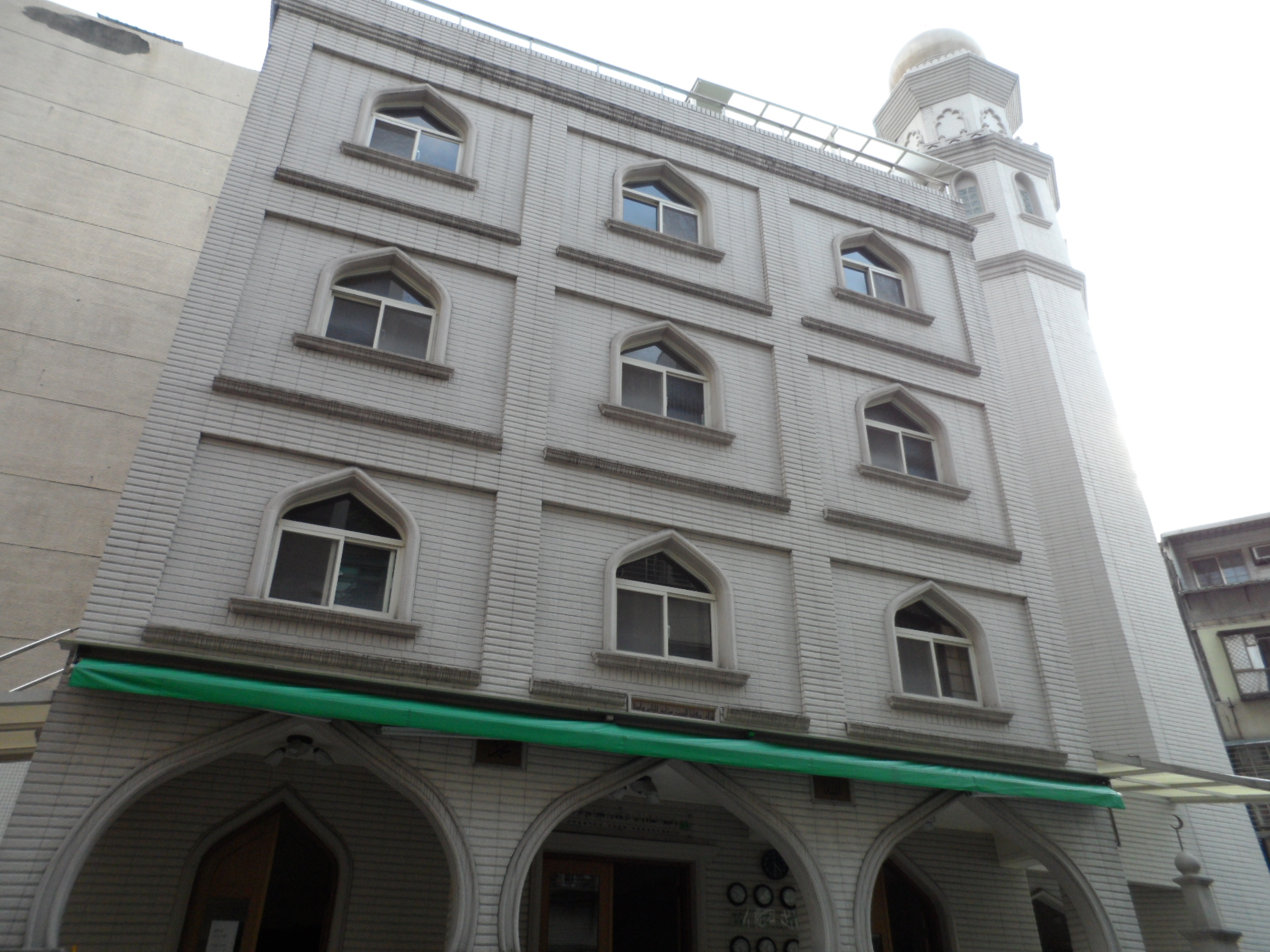
- Abbreviation: THIDA
- Formation: 7 May 2011
- Headquarters: Level 3, Taipei Cultural Mosque
- Location: No. 3, Lane 25, Sec. 1, Xing Hai Road, Zhongzheng, Taipei, Taiwan
- Key people: Isa Chao (vice secretary-general)
- Website: Official website (in Chinese)

The Taiwan Halal Integrity Development Association (THIDA; traditional Chinese: 台灣清真產業品質保證推廣協會; simplified Chinese: 台湾清真产业品质保证推广协会; pinyin: Táiwān Qīngzhēn Chǎnyè Pǐnzhí Bǎozhèng Tuīguǎng Xiéhuì) is a certification body that produces Halal certificates in the Republic of China. The association is based in the Taipei Cultural Mosque in Taipei.

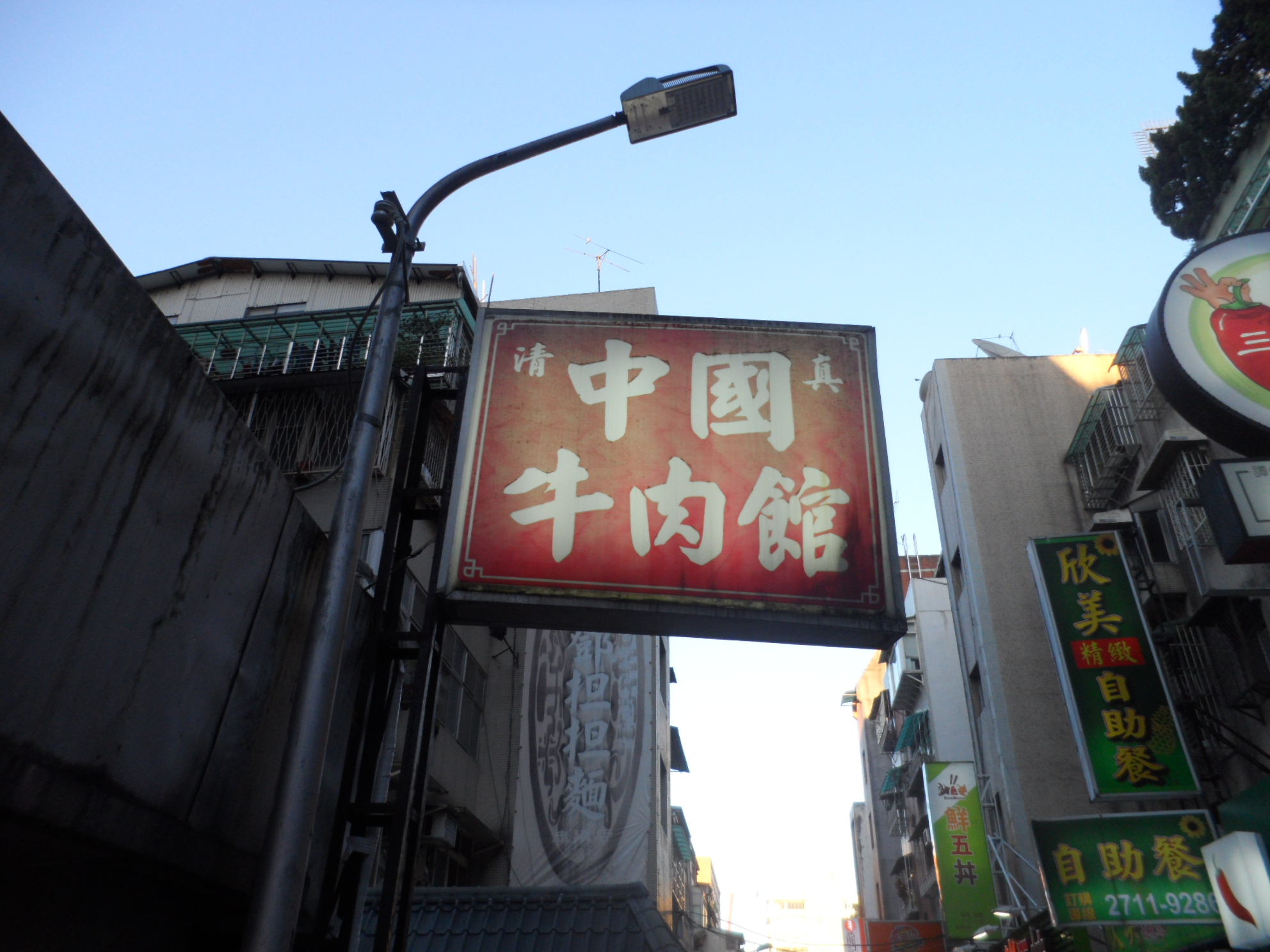
A Chinese halal restaurant in Da'an, Taipei.

== History ==
THIDA was inaugurated on 7 May 2011 in Taipei. The opening ceremony was attended by association managers, economic representatives, business people and around 300 Taiwan Halal Good Association companies and their relevant factions in Taiwan. It is also the member of World Halal Food Council.

== Objectives ==
The objectives of this association is:

- Ensure the Halal-ness to all Muslim consumers anywhere in the world
- Protect the Halal integrity of local certification bodies from mistakes or mishandling by a few black sheep
- Avoid consequences from such mistakes that may affect interests of other law-abiding companies
- Allow sharing of the limited resources of each individual mosque in both the shariah and technical fields

== Organization charts ==
- General Assembly
- Board of Directors and Supervisors
- President
- Secretaries
  - Halal Industry Promotion
    - Trade Show
    - Business Integration
    - International Relations
  - Halal Certification
    - Evaluation and Examination
    - Audit and Supervision
    - Education and Training
  - Administration
    - Legal Affairs
    - Finance
    - Documents
  - Consultation
    - Collaboration
    - Industry Advisory

== See also ==
- Islamic dietary laws
- Islam in Taiwan
- Taiwan Halal Center
