= List of mosques in Taiwan =

This is a list of mosques in Taiwan. As of February 2025, there were eleven mosques in Taiwan.

Map of Taiwan: Mosque

== List of mosques ==
The Taipei Grand Mosque is the largest and oldest mosque in Taiwan.

Name	Chinese	Taiwanese	Hakka	Image	Location	Year (CE)	Notes
Taipei Grand Mosque	台北清真寺	Tâi-pak Chheng-chin-sī	Thòi-pet Chhîn-chṳ̂n-sṳ		Da'an, Taipei	1947 (original); 1960 (current)	
Kaohsiung Mosque	高雄清真寺	Ko-hiông Chheng-chin-sī	Kô-hiùng Chhîn-chṳ̂n-sṳ		Lingya, Kaohsiung	1949 (original); 1951 (second); 1992 (current)	
Taipei Cultural Mosque	台北文化清真寺	Tâi-pak Bûn-hoà Chheng-chin-sī	Thòi-pet Vùn-fa Chhîn-chṳ̂n-sṳ		Zhongzheng, Taipei	1950 (original); 1982 (current)	
Taichung Mosque	台中清真寺	Tâi-tiong Chheng-chin-sī	Thòi-chûng Chhîn-chṳ̂n-sṳ		Nantun, Taichung	1951 (original); 1990 (current)	
Longgang Mosque	龍岡清真寺	Liông-kong Chheng-chin-sī	Liùng-kông Chhîn-chṳ̂n-sṳ		Zhongli, Taoyuan	1967 (original); 1989 (current)	
Tainan Mosque	台南清真寺	Tâi-lâm Chheng-chin-sī	Thòi-nàm Chhîn-chṳ̂n-sṳ		East District, Tainan	1996	
At-Taqwa Mosque	大園清真寺	Toā-Hng Chheng-chin-sī	Thai-yèn Chhîn-chṳ̂n-sṳ		Dayuan, Taoyuan	2013	
Baitul Muslimin Mosque	巴特爾穆斯林清真寺				Su'ao, Yilan	2014 (original); 2019 (current)	
An-Nur Tongkang Mosque	東港清真寺	Tang-káng Chheng-chin-sī	Tûng-kóng Chhîn-chṳ̂n-sṳ		Donggang, Pingtung	2018	
Hualien Al-Falah Mosque	花蓮清真寺				Hualien City, Hualien County	2018	
Tainan Mosque	台南市阿薩拉姆清真寺				Tainan City		

== See also ==
- Islam in Taiwan
- Lists of mosques
