= An-Nur (disambiguation) =

An-Nur (Arabic: النور, "the light", alternately Al-Noor, Al-Nur, An-Noor) may refer to:

== In Literature ==
=== Qur'an verses ===
- An-Nur, the 24th chapter of the Qur'an
  - Ayat an-Nur, the 35th line of the surah An-Nur

== Places ==
=== Mosques ===
- An-Nur Kota Raya Mosque in Johor, Malaysia
- An-Nur Tongkang Mosque in Donggang, Taiwan
- An-Nur Mosque in Dili, East Timor
- An-Nur Great Mosque in Pekanbaru, Indonesia
- An-Nur Jamek Mosque in Labuan, Malaysia
- Masjid An-Nur Islamic Center in Sacramento, California
- Masjid-an-Noor in Newfoundland, Canada
- An-Noor Mosque in Guam, U.S. territories
- Al-Nour Mosque in Cairo, Egypt
- Al Noor Mosque in Sharjah, United Arab Emirates
- Al Noor Mosque in Christchurch, New Zealand
- Al-Noor Mosque in Santo Domingo, Dominican Republic

=== Schools ===
- Al Noor Academy in Mansfield, Massachusetts
- Al-Noor School in Brooklyn, New York
- Al Noor International School in Sitra, Bahrain

=== Hospitals ===
- Al Noor Hospitals, a hospital management company in Abu Dhabi, United Arab Emirates

== Other ==
=== All other ===
- Al Noor FC, a football club in Qatif, Saudi Arabia
- Al Noor Kassum, a Tanzanian politician
- Al-Nour Party, an Egyptian political entity
