= Al Noor Mosque =

Al-Noor Mosque (Arabic: مسجد النور, romanized: Masjid An-Nūr) may refer to:

== Algeria ==
- Mosquée El-Nour (Algiers)

== Dominican Republic ==
- Al-Noor Mosque (Santo Domingo), Santo Domingo

== East Timor ==
- An-Nur Mosque (Dili), Dili

== Egypt ==
- Al-Nour Mosque (Cairo), Cairo

== Germany ==
- Noor Mosque, Frankfurt

== Ghana ==
- Masjid Al-Noor (Tamale), Wayamba

== India ==
- Noor Mosque, Qadian

== Indonesia ==
- Masjid An-Nur Batu Merah, Ambon, Maluku
- An-Nur Great Mosque Pekanbaru, Pekanbaru, Riau

== Iraq ==
- Al Noor Mosque (Mosul)

== Japan ==
- Annur Mosque (Japan), Niigata, Niigata Prefecture

== Malaysia ==
- An-Nur Jamek Mosque, Labuan
- An-Nur Kota Raya Mosque, Johor Bahru, Johor

== Maldives ==
- Al Noor Mosque (Male)

== Morocco ==
- Al-Nour Mosque (Morocco), in Azrou

== New Zealand ==
- Al Noor Mosque, Christchurch

== United Arab Emirates ==
- Al Noor Mosque (Sharjah)

== United States ==
- Al Noor Mosque (City Heights)
- Nur Mosque, in the St. Louis Islamic Center, St. Louis, Missouri
- An-Noor Mosque (Guam)

== United Kingdom ==
- Noor Mosque, Crawley

== Yemen ==
- Al Noor Mosque (Lahj), Lahj
- Al Noor Mosque (Yafa), Yafa
