= Annur (disambiguation) =

Annur is a town panchayat and taluk headquarters of Annur Taluk of Coimbatore district.

Annur may also refer to:

- Annur Sree Mahavishnu Temple
- Annur Block
- Annur taluk
- Annur mosque (disambiguation)
