= Pasur =

Pasur may refer to:

- Pasur (card game), a card game
- Pasur, Erode, a town in India
- Pasur, Coimbatore, a town in India

See also:

- Pasrur, a city in Pakistan
