= Indonesians in Taiwan =

Indonesians in Taiwan Orang Indonesia di Republik Tiongkok 在臺印度尼西亞人
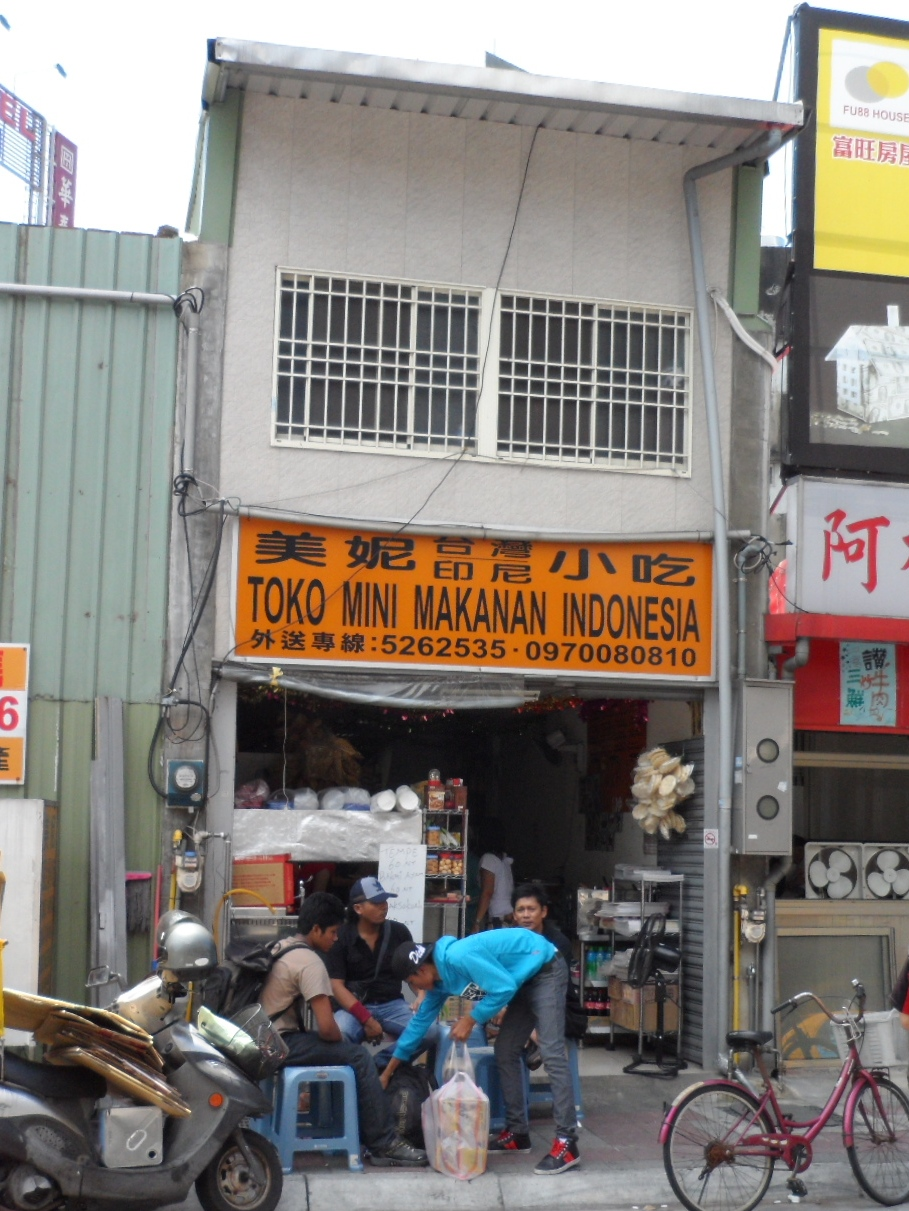
- Indonesian food shop in Hsinchu City

Total population
- 319,788 with Indonesian nationality (September 2025)

Regions with significant populations
- Taipei, Kaohsiung, Taoyuan

Languages
- Indonesian, Javanese, Sundanese, English language, Hakka Chinese, Mandarin Chinese or Hokkien Chinese

Religion
- Majority Sunni Islam minorities of Hinduism · Buddhism · Christianity

Related ethnic groups
- Various ethnic groups in Indonesia

Indonesians in Taiwan form one of the island's larger communities of foreign residents. There are 144,651 people who have nationality of the Republic of Indonesia reside in Taiwan as of December 2010. This includes 19,554 males and 125,097 females, with 136,679 people serving as foreign laborers.

26,980 Indonesians (many of them with Chinese ancestry, such as Hakka people) had immigrated to Taiwan through international marriage, mostly female, and some had naturalized into Taiwan citizenship.

In Taiwan, employers can be fined if they force Muslim workers to come into contact with pork, something forbidden by the Muslim religion that most Indonesians profess. In Chiayi City, a couple was fined for the offence, in addition to other offences such as an imposing a long workday, and threats of deportation.

In 2013, an Indonesian worker, who married to a local Taiwanese man, built a mosque called the At-Taqwa Mosque in Dayuan Township, Taoyuan County (now Dayuan District, Taoyuan City) to support the growing number of Muslims, especially from the Indonesian workers community. Two other similar mosques, one in Donggang Township, Pingtung County called An-Nur Tongkang Mosque and another in Hualien City, Hualien County called Hualien Al-Falah Mosque were built by the local Indonesian communities in 2018.

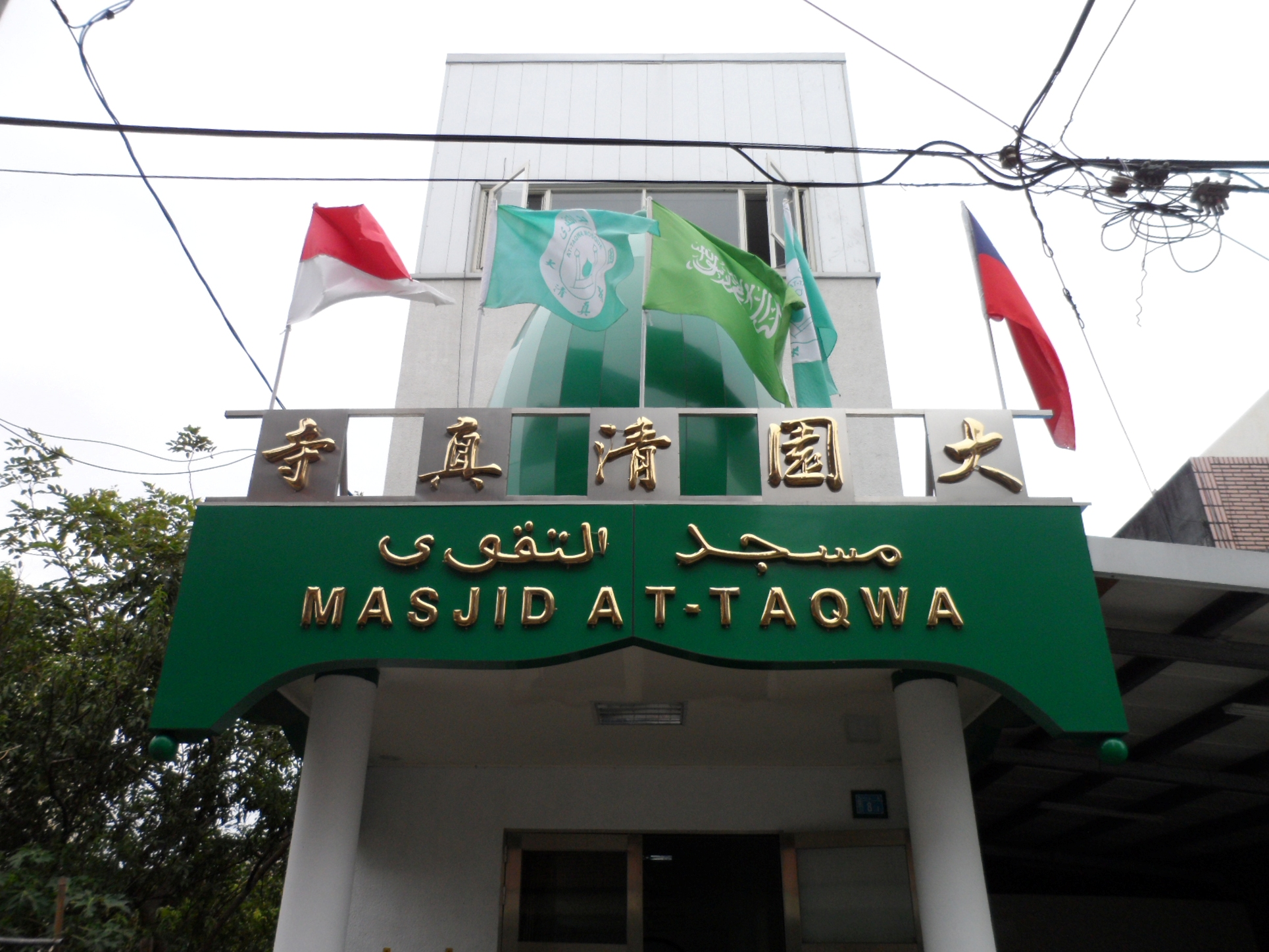
At-Taqwa Mosque in Dayuan District, Taoyuan City.

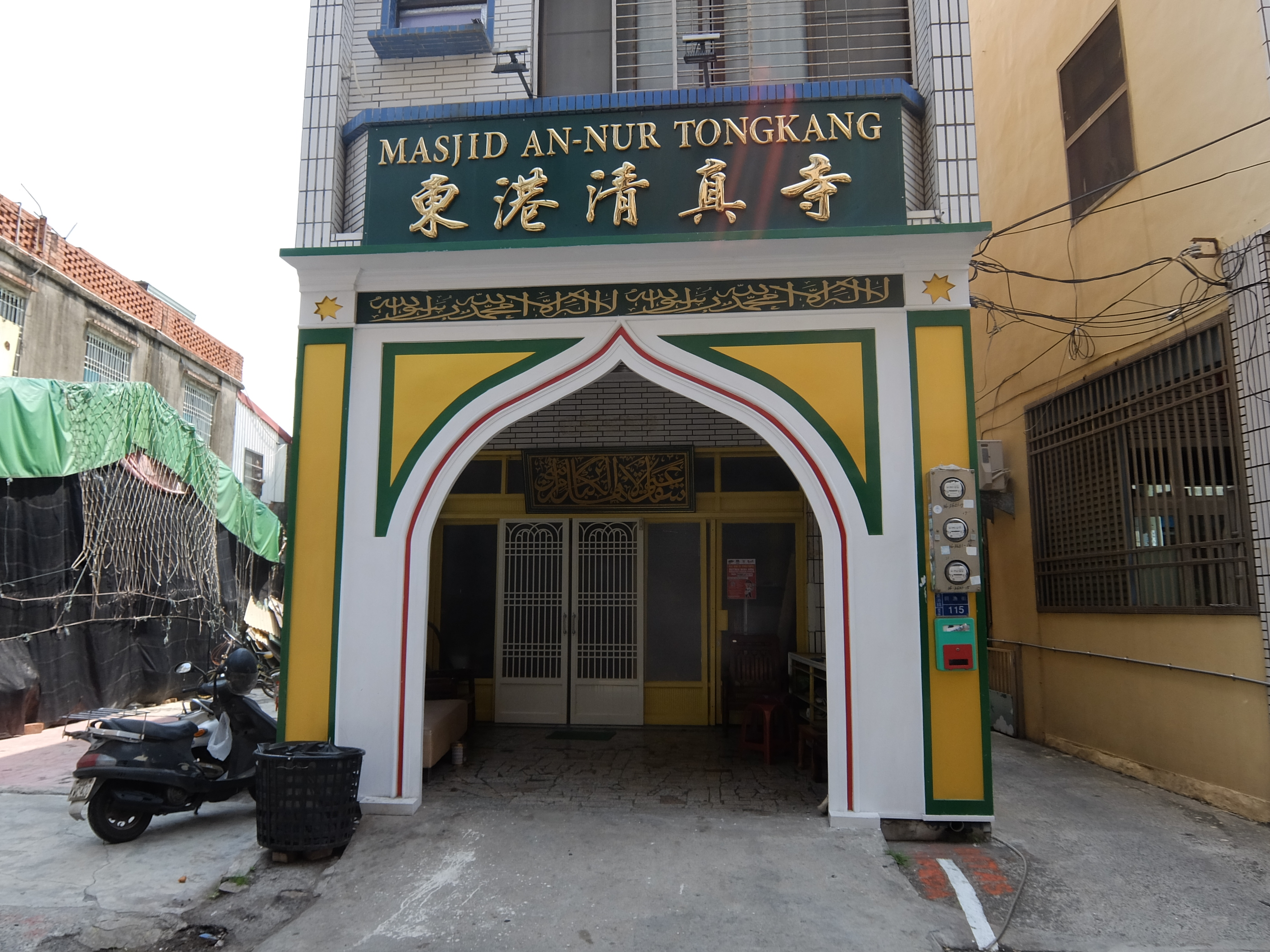
An-Nur Tongkang Mosque in Donggang Township, Pingtung County.

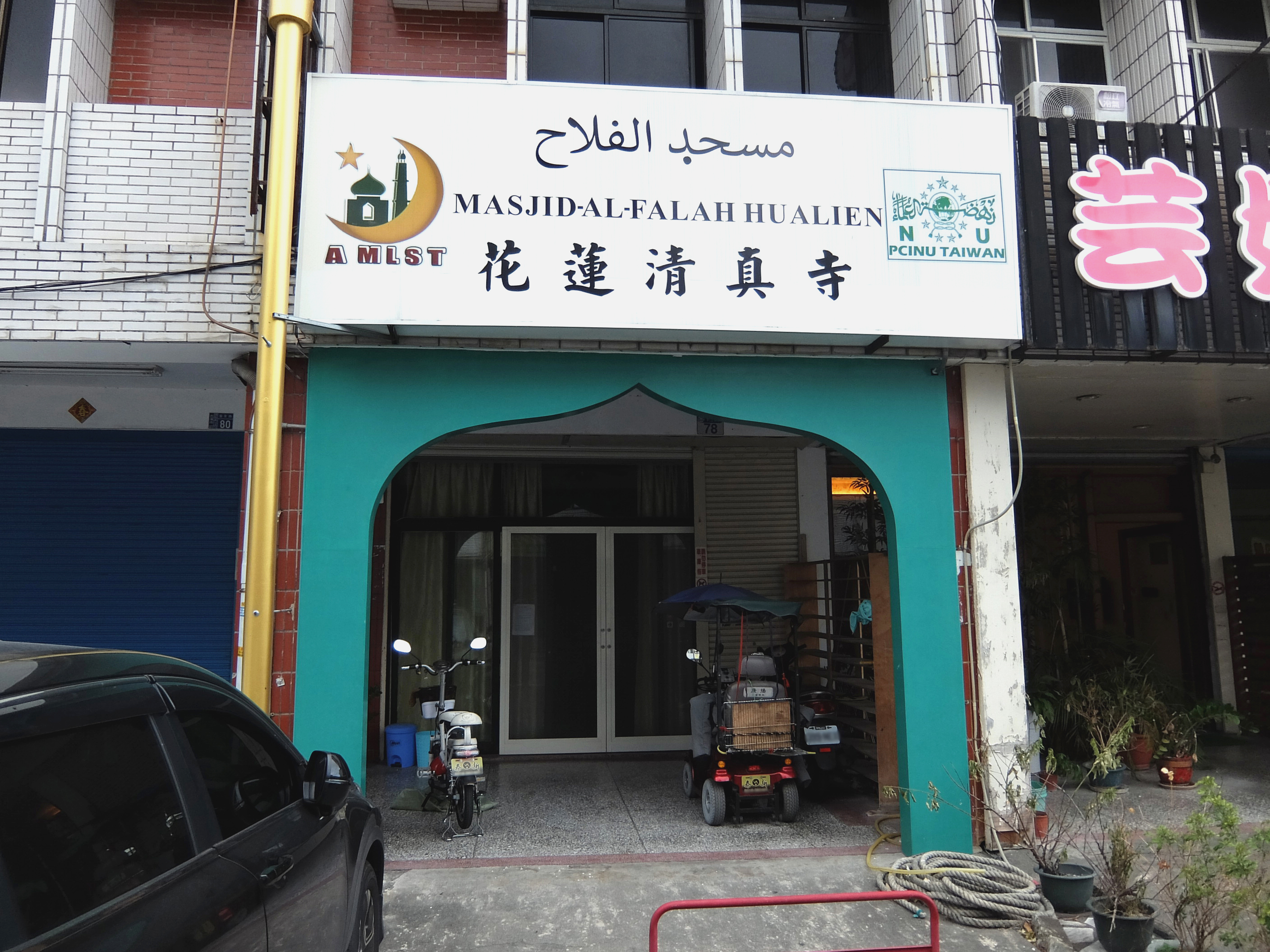
Hualien Al-Falah Mosque in Hualien City, Hualien County.

Indonesians with Christian backgrounds also established several communities and churches in Taiwan. Katolik Indonesia di Taiwan (Indonesian Catholics in Taiwan) or KITA was established on 12 April 1997 as a community for Indonesian Catholics in Taiwan to share and grow their Catholic faith together. Meanwhile, churches such as Indonesian Ministry Bread of Life Church (IMBLOC) and Indonesian Reformed Evangelical Church, through the establishment of GRII Taipei in 1997, exist to serve Indonesians with Protestant background in Taiwan.

== See also ==
- Overseas Indonesian
- Indonesia–Taiwan relations
