= Annur Block =

Annur block is a revenue block of Coimbatore district of the Indian state of Tamil Nadu. This revenue block consist of 21 panchayat villages.

== List of Panchayat Villages ==
They are,

SI.No	Panchayat Village
1	A.Mettupalayam
2	A.Sengappalli
3	Allapalayam
4	Ambothi
5	Kanjapalli
6	Kanvakkarai
7	Karegoundenplm
8	Kariampalayam
9	Kattampatti
10	Kunnathur
11	Kuppanur
12	Kuppepalayam
13	M.G.C.Palayam
14	Naranapuram
15	Odderpalayam
16	Pachapalayam
17	Pasur
18	Pilliappampalayam
19	Pogalur
20	Vadakkalur
21	Vadavalli
