= Islam in Guam =

Islam in Guam (Arabic:إسلام في غوام) is a minority religion in Guam, constituting less than 1% of the island’s population. The majority of Muslims in Guam are immigrants from various Islamic countries, while a small number are local residents who are U.S. citizens.

== History ==
Islam was introduced to Guam between the early 20th century and the beginning of the 21st century by immigrants from Egypt, Sudan, Morocco, Pakistan, India, Bangladesh, Eritrea, Afghanistan, Malaysia, Indonesia, and the United States. The spread of Islam on the island was further supported by the Muslim Association of Guam.

== Islamic organisation ==
To cater to the growing Muslim community in Guam, the Muslim Association of Guam was established in 1990. The association is actively involved in propagating Islam and organising key Islamic celebrations such as Ramadan and Eid al-Adha. It also serves as a platform to provide accurate information about Islam to the broader public and aims to foster mutual understanding among Guam’s diverse religious communities.

== Present day ==
The practice of Islam in Guam remains limited. According (2011) to the Pew Research Center, Muslims currently make up less than 1% of the national population.

Currently, there is only one mosque on the island, An-Nur Mosque, which is located in Mangilao village.

== Mosque ==
By the late 20th century, the Muslim population in Guam had grown to around 100 individuals, accounting for approximately 0.1% of the island’s total population. Recognising the need for a mosque, the Muslim Association of Guam initiated the construction of An-Nur Mosque in 1997. Due to budgetary constraints, the mosque was built as a simple structure over three years and was officially inaugurated in 2000 in the village of Mangilao, alongside the Muslim Association’s centre.

The first imam of the mosque was Farouq Abawi, a professor at the University of Guam. The current imam is Muhammad Asmuni (Muni) Abdullah, who is an architect. The mosque holds five daily prayers, Friday congregational prayers, and sermons in English, while Qur’anic recitations are done in Arabic. The mosque also offers evening classes for children on Fridays and family gatherings on Sundays.
