= At-Taqwa Mosque, Taiwan =

Mosque in Dayuan, Taoyuan City, Taiwan

At-Taqwa Mosque
- 大園清真寺
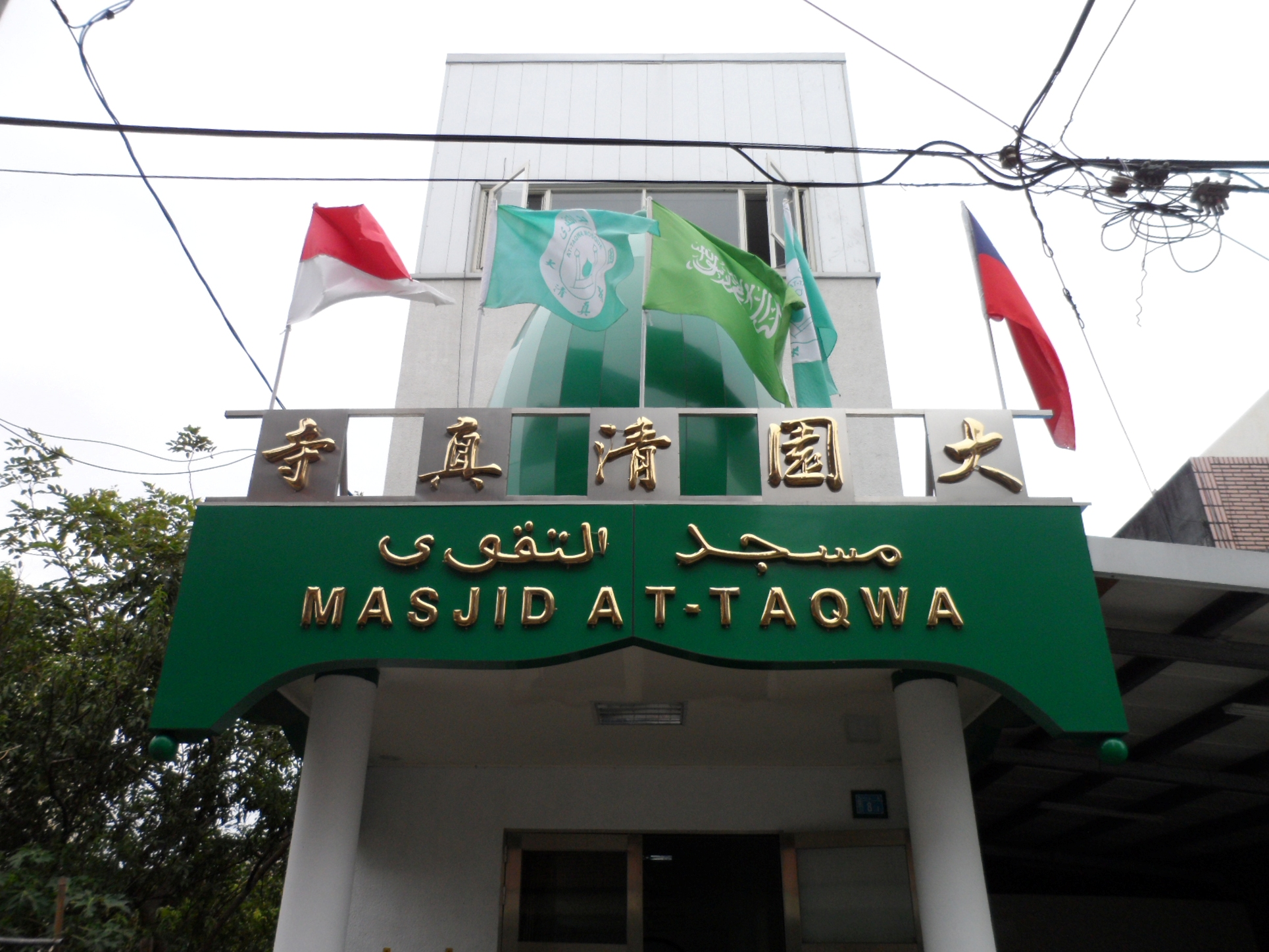

- Location of the mosque in Taiwan

Religion
- Affiliation: Sunni Islam
- Ecclesiastical or organizational status: Mosque
- Status: Active

Location
- Location: No. 8-2, Zi Li 1st Road, Dayuan, Taoyuan City
- Country: Taiwan
- Interactive map of At-Taqwa Mosque
- Coordinates: 25°04′02″N 121°10′49″E

Architecture
- Type: Mosque
- Completed: 2013
- Construction cost: NT$6,990,000

Specifications
- Length: 26 m (85 ft)
- Width: 5 m (16 ft)
- Interior area: 130 m^{2} (1,400 sq ft)
- Dome: 1

Chinese name
- Traditional Chinese: 大園清真寺
- Simplified Chinese: 大园清真寺
Transcriptions
Standard Mandarin
- Hanyu Pinyin: Dàyuán Qīngzhēnsì

Indonesian name
- Indonesian: Masjid At-Taqwa

The At-Taqwa Mosque (traditional Chinese: 大園清真寺; simplified Chinese: 大园清真寺; pinyin: Dàyuán Qīngzhēnsì; Indonesian: Masjid At-Taqwa) is a mosque in the Dayuan District of Taoyuan City, Taiwan.

== History ==
The mosque development was started by an Indonesian-Taiwanese couple who own an Indonesian shop around the area where most of the Indonesian workers work at the factories or in households. They purchased empty land beside their shop to build a mosque. With the help of funding and lending from various organizations, the mosque was constructed a year later and was officially opened on 9 June 2013. On 24 April 2016, the Taiwan Muslim Association (Chinese: 台湾輔導穆斯林協會; pinyin: Táiwān Fǔdǎo Mùsīlín Xiéhuì), abbreviated as TMA, was established and headquartered at the mosque.

== Architecture ==
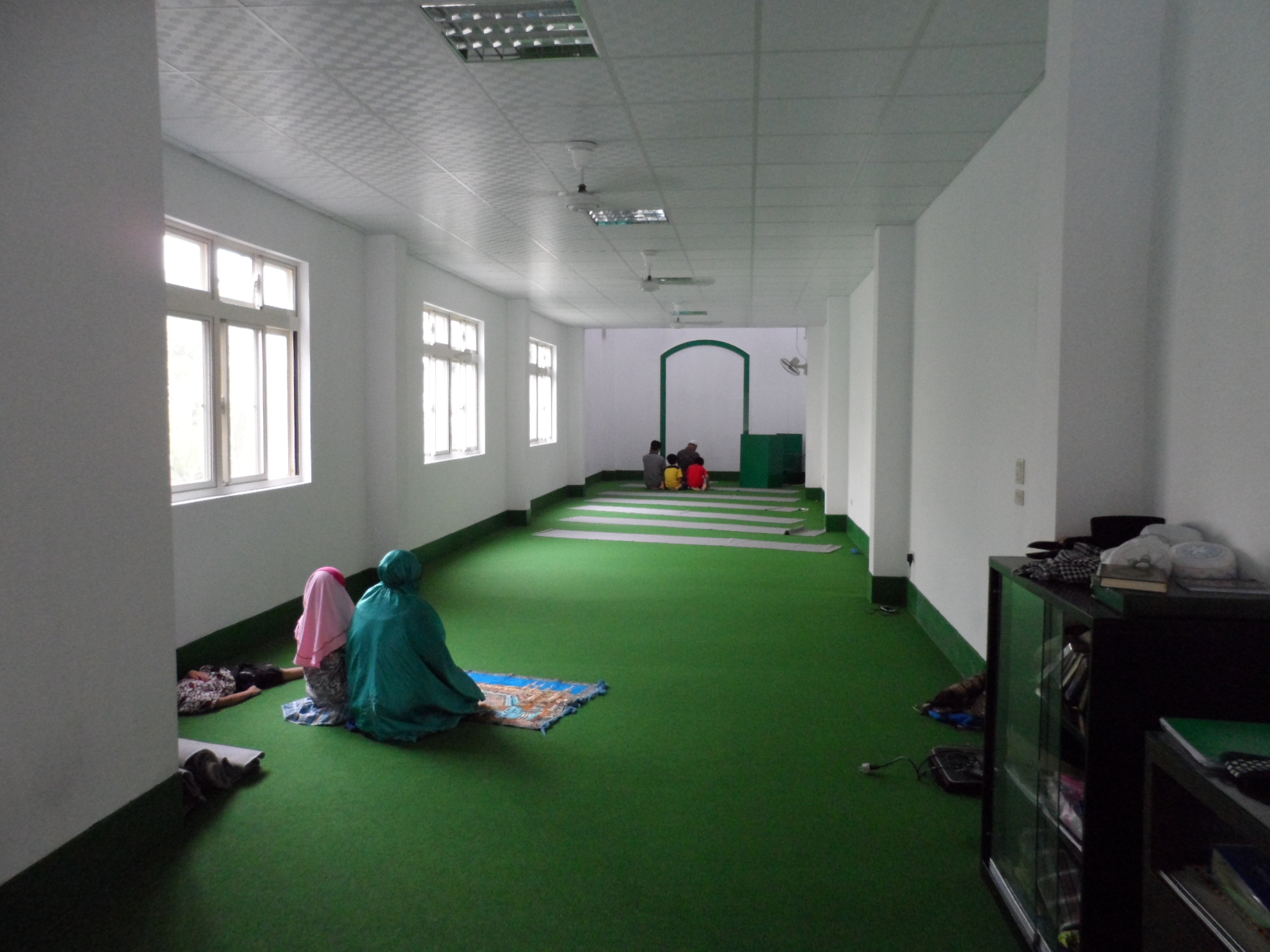
The mosque prayer hall

The 130-square-metre (1,400 sq ft) mosque is 26 metres (85 ft) long and 5 metres (16 ft) wide. The building consists of three storeys, in which the first storey is dedicated for the male prayer hall, the second storey is for the female prayer hall and guest room, and the third floor is for classes and dormitories.

== Activities ==
Beside hosting the normal five compulsory daily prayers, the mosque also regularly holds classes, such as Mandarin language. The mosque hosted the branch office of the Zakat foundation Dompet Peduli Ummat Daarut Tauhiid (DPU DT) in early 2017. It is also the headquarters of the Taiwan Muslim Association.

== Transportation ==
At-Taqwa Mosque is accessible northwest of Dayuan Station of the Taoyuan Metro.

== See also ==
- Islam in Taiwan
- List of mosques in Taiwan
- Indonesians in Taiwan
