= Hualien Al-Falah Mosque =

Mosque in Hualien City, Hualien County, Taiwan

- 花蓮清真寺
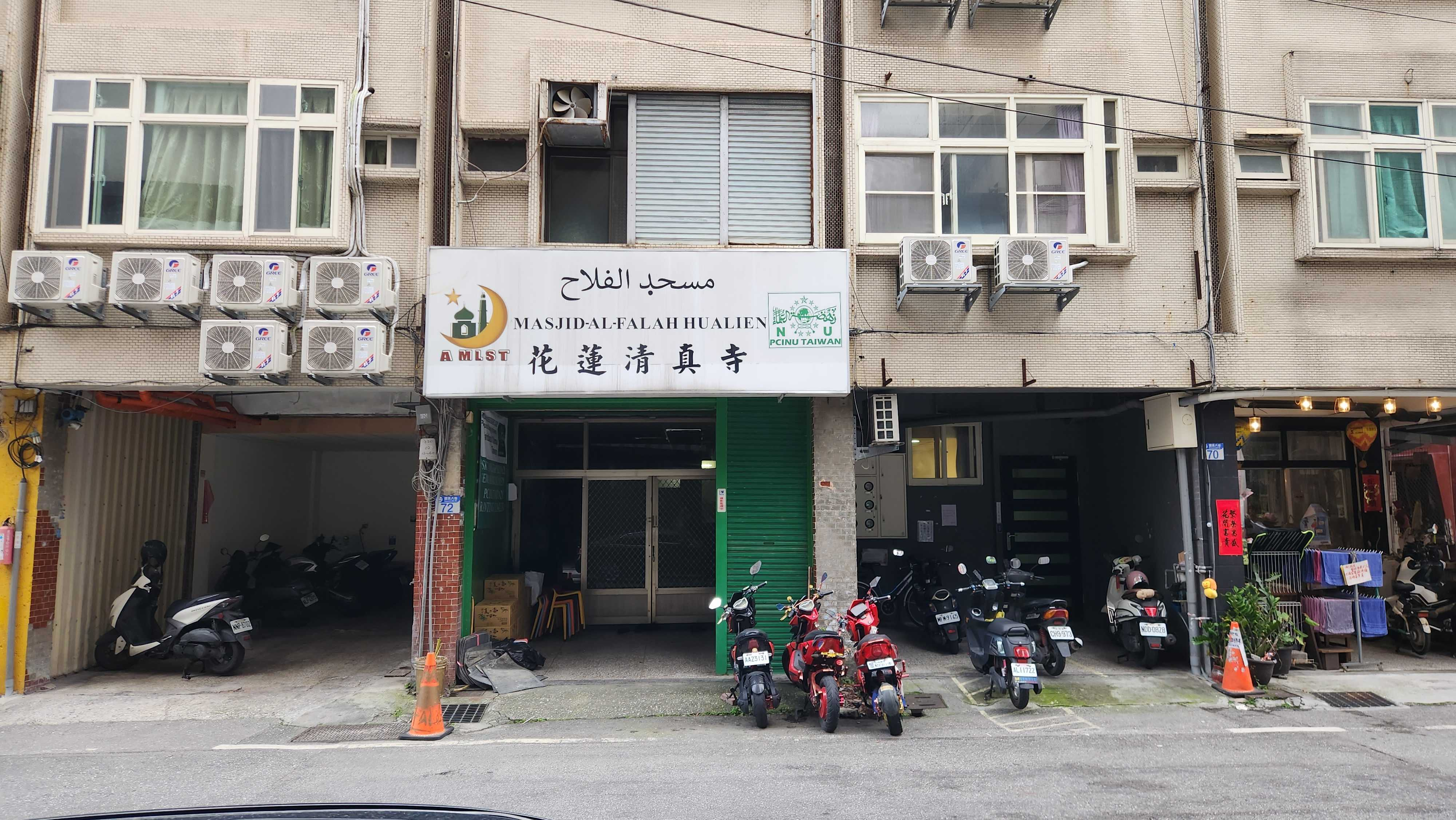
- The mosque in 2025, at its current location

- Location of the mosque in Hualien County

Religion
- Affiliation: Sunni Islam
- Ecclesiastical or organizational status: Mosque
- Status: Active

Location
- Location: 72 Guomin 8th Street, Hualien City, Hualien County
- Country: Taiwan
- Interactive map of Hualien Al-Falah Mosque
- Coordinates: 23°59′36″N 121°36′22″E

Architecture
- Type: Mosque
- Completed: 2018 (former location); c. 2020s (current location)

Chinese name
- Traditional Chinese: 花蓮清真寺
- Simplified Chinese: 花莲清真寺
Transcriptions
Standard Mandarin
- Hanyu Pinyin: Huālián Qīngzhēnsì

The Hualien Al-Falah Mosque (traditional Chinese: 花蓮清真寺; simplified Chinese: 花莲清真寺; pinyin: Huālián Qīngzhēnsì) is a mosque in Hualien City, in the Hualien County of Taiwan.

== History ==
The mosque was inaugurated by former Indonesian Minister of Law and Human Rights Mahfud MD on 18 March 2018. On 10 November 2019, an information and complaint service counter for Indonesian migrant workers in Taiwan was established at the meeting room of the mosque building.

== Activities ==
The mosque is the venue for Quran recitation activities by Majelis Taklim Nurul Iman Hualien. The mosque is also the center for information and complaint center for the migrant workers from Indonesia.

== Transportation ==
The mosque is within walking distance northwest of Hualien Station of Taiwan Railway.

== Gallery ==
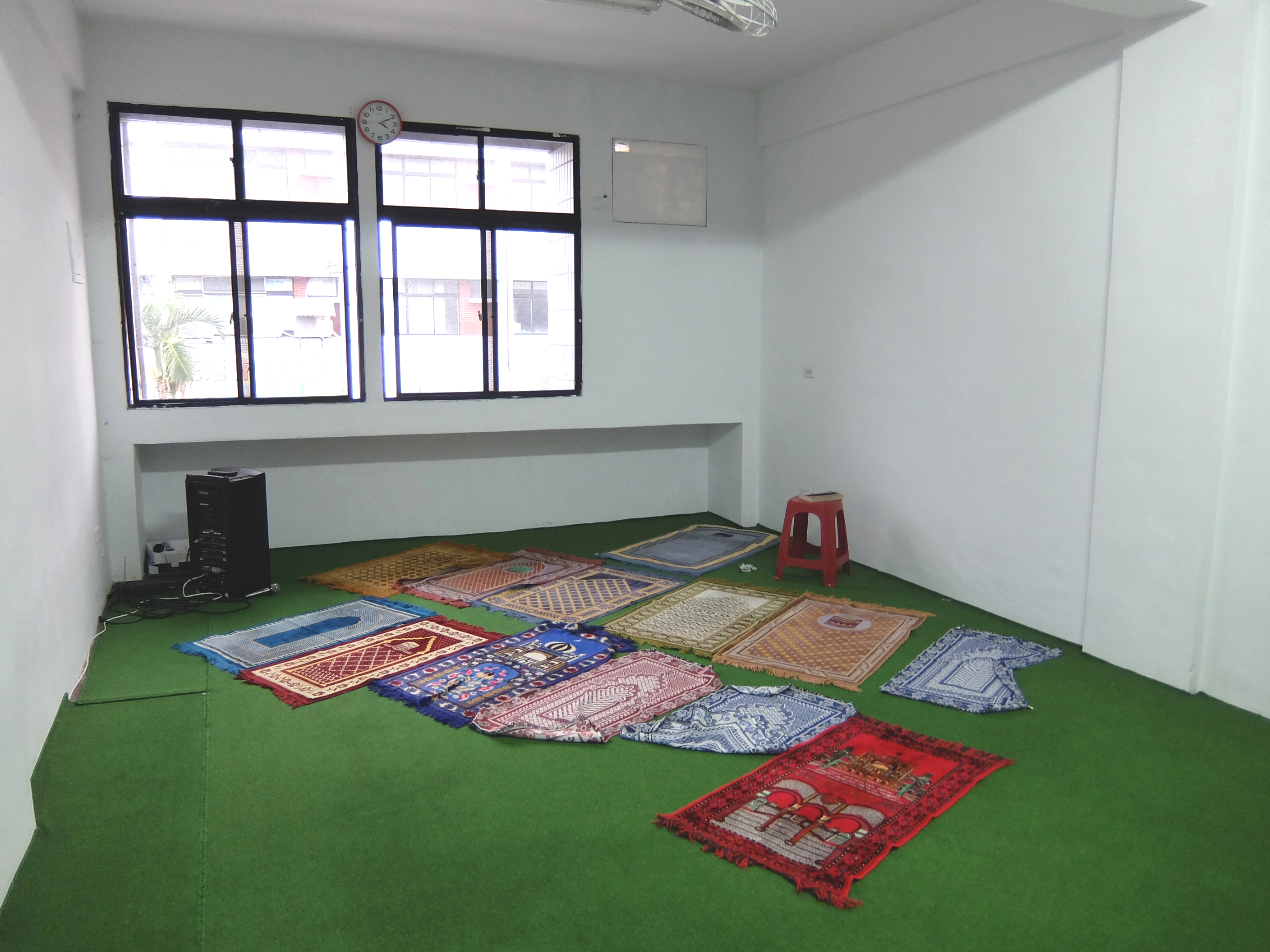
The mosque prayer hall

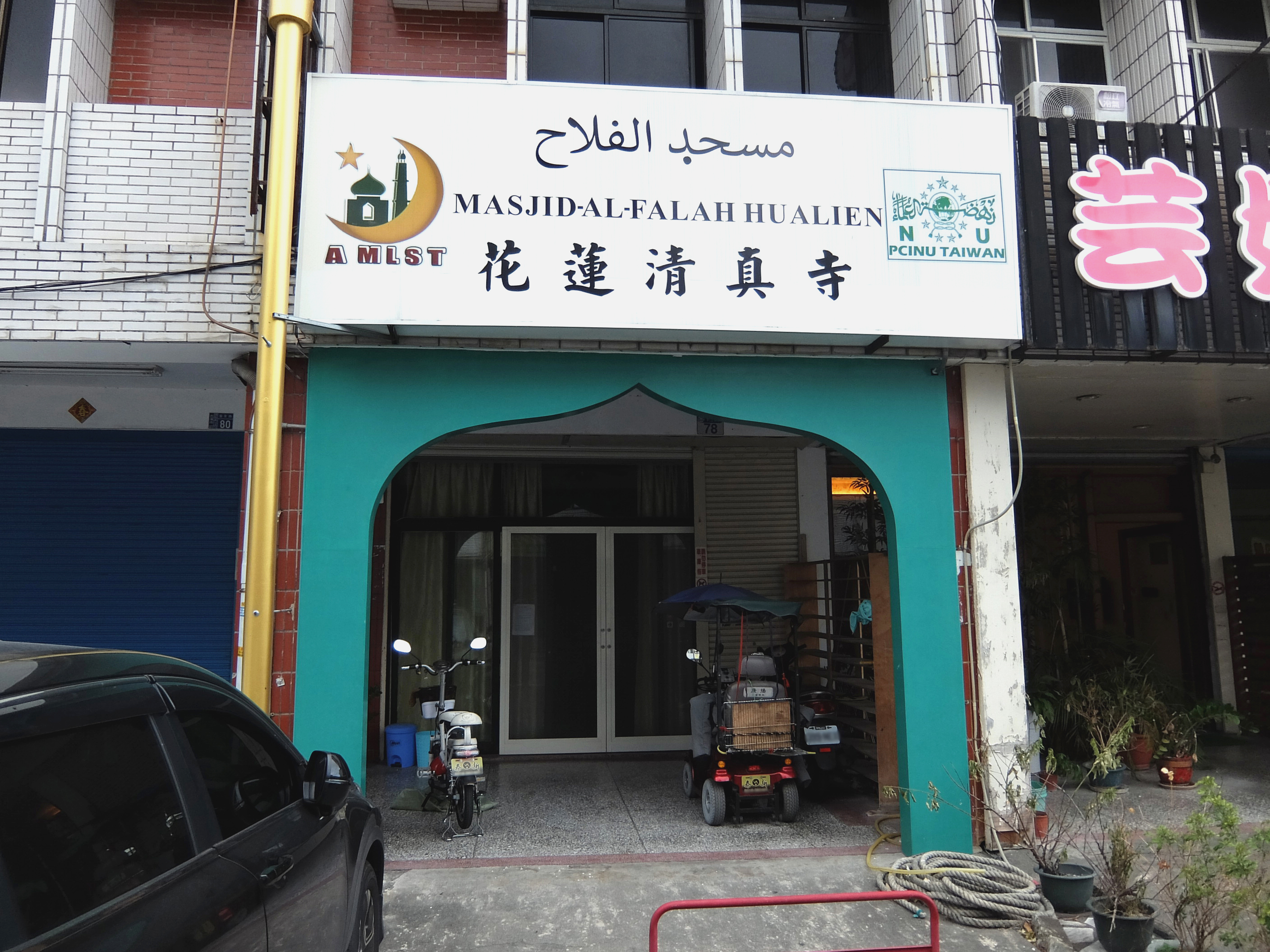
The mosque in 2019 at its former location

== See also ==
- Islam in Taiwan
- List of mosques in Taiwan
