= An-Nur Tongkang Mosque =

Mosque in Donggang, Pingtung County, Taiwan

- 東港清真寺
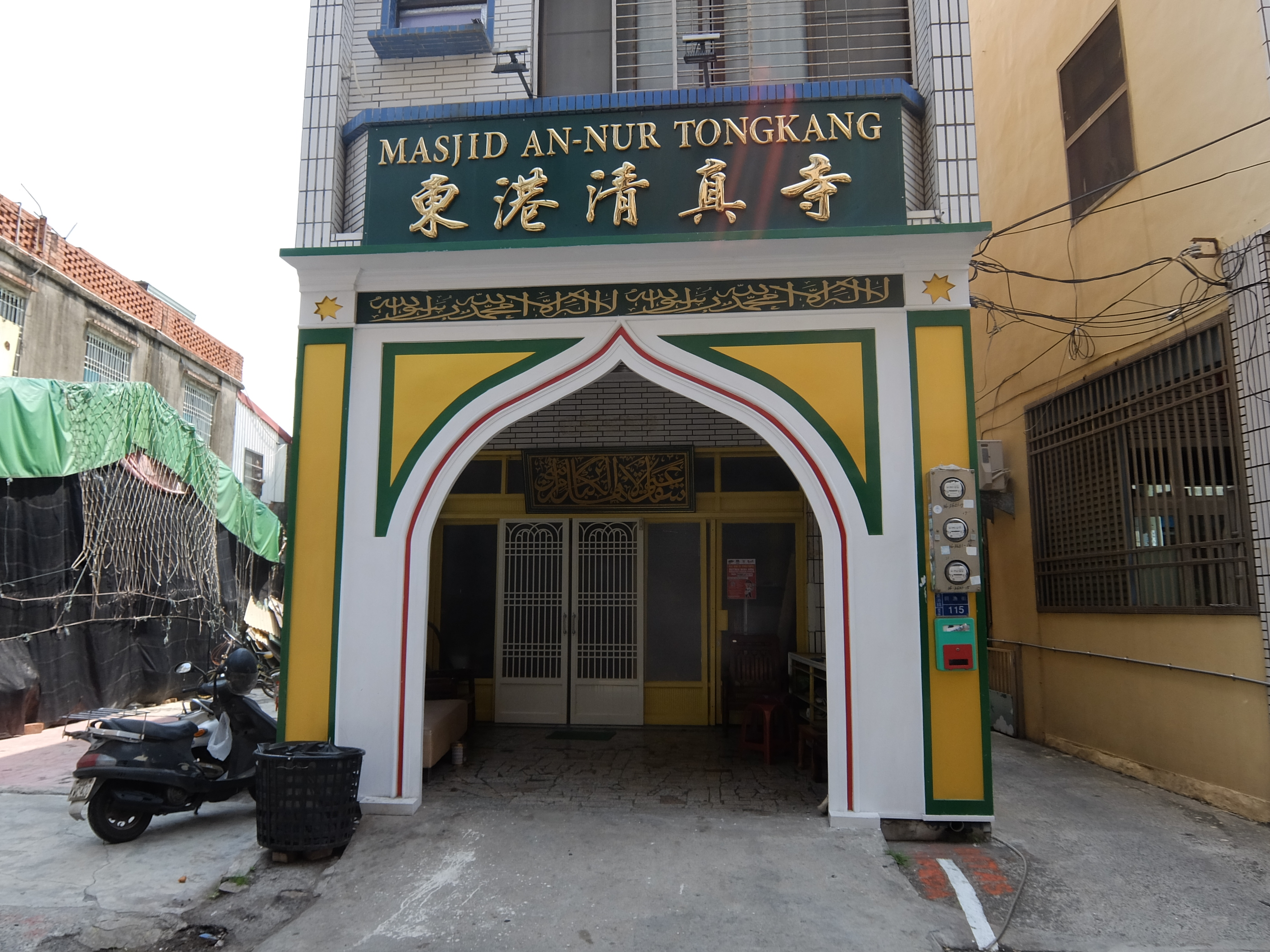

- Location of the mosque in Pingtung County

Religion
- Affiliation: Sunni Islam

Location
- Location: 115 Xingyu Street, Donggang, Pingtung County
- Country: Taiwan
- Interactive map of An-Nur Tongkang Mosque
- Coordinates: 22°27′41″N 120°26′48″E

Architecture
- Type: Mosque
- Founder: Muksin
- Completed: 2017
- Construction cost: NT$6,400,000
- Capacity: 120 worshipers

Chinese name
- Traditional Chinese: 東港清真寺
- Simplified Chinese: 东港清真寺
Transcriptions
Standard Mandarin
- Hanyu Pinyin: Dōnggǎng Qīngzhēnsì

The An-Nur Tongkang Mosque (traditional Chinese: 東港清真寺; simplified Chinese: 东港清真寺; pinyin: Dōnggǎng Qīngzhēnsì) is a mosque in the Donggang Township of Pingtung County, Taiwan.

== History ==
The mosque started inside a rented house at 34-1 Fengyu Street (豐漁街) in Donggang Township, in which most of the worshipers were Indonesian fishermen from the area. After enough funds were collected over ten years, the community wanted to purchase the rented house and convert it into a mosque. The house owner was reluctant to sell, so the community looked for a different house. They finally found one nearby in Xingyu Street (興漁街), which is still located within the same township, and purchased it for an amount of NT$5.4 million. It was then renovated for a cost of NT$1 million and was eventually turned into a mosque with the addition of a wudu area and some air conditioning systems. The mosque was officially opened on 18 February 2018.

On 9 December 2018, Interior Minister Hsu Kuo-yung honored and paid tribute to the mosque founder in conjunction with the International Migrants Day for his fundraising efforts in establishing the mosque.

== Architecture ==
The mosque is located on the third floor of a three-story house building with capacity of 120 worshipers. The mosque is also equipped with a Quran reading area and a madrasa.

== See also ==
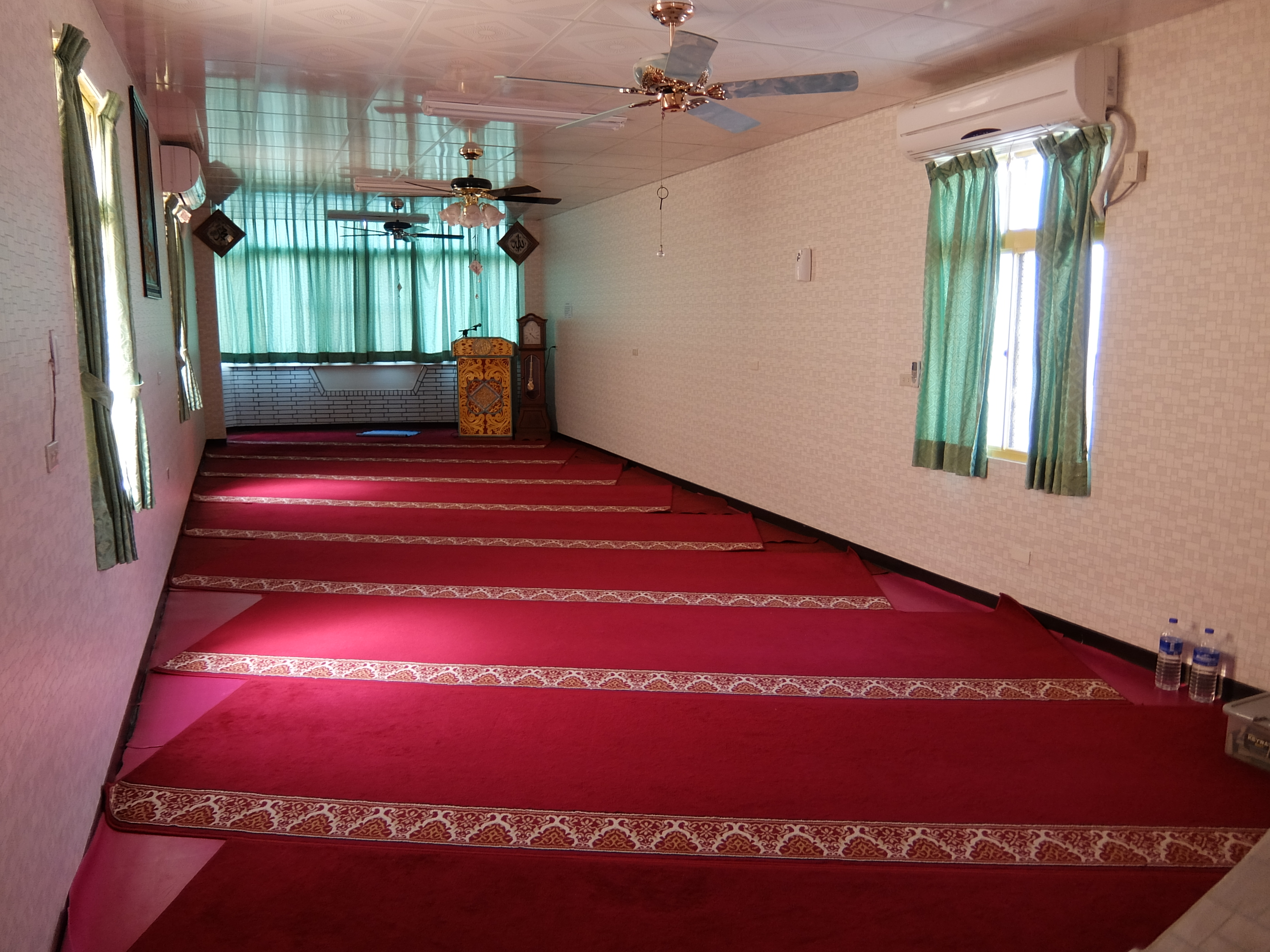
The mosque prayer hall

- Islam in Taiwan
- List of mosques in Taiwan
