= Wayamba, Ghana =

Community in Tolon District, Northern Region, Ghana

Coordinates: 9.523°N 1.110°W

Wayamba is a community in Tamale Metropolitan District in the Northern Region of Ghana. It is a less populated community with nucleated settlement. People in the community are predominantly farmers and the women are also known for shea butter production.

== See also ==
- Suburbs of Tamale (Ghana) metropolis
- Masjid Al-Noor (Tamale)
