= Al Noor Academy =

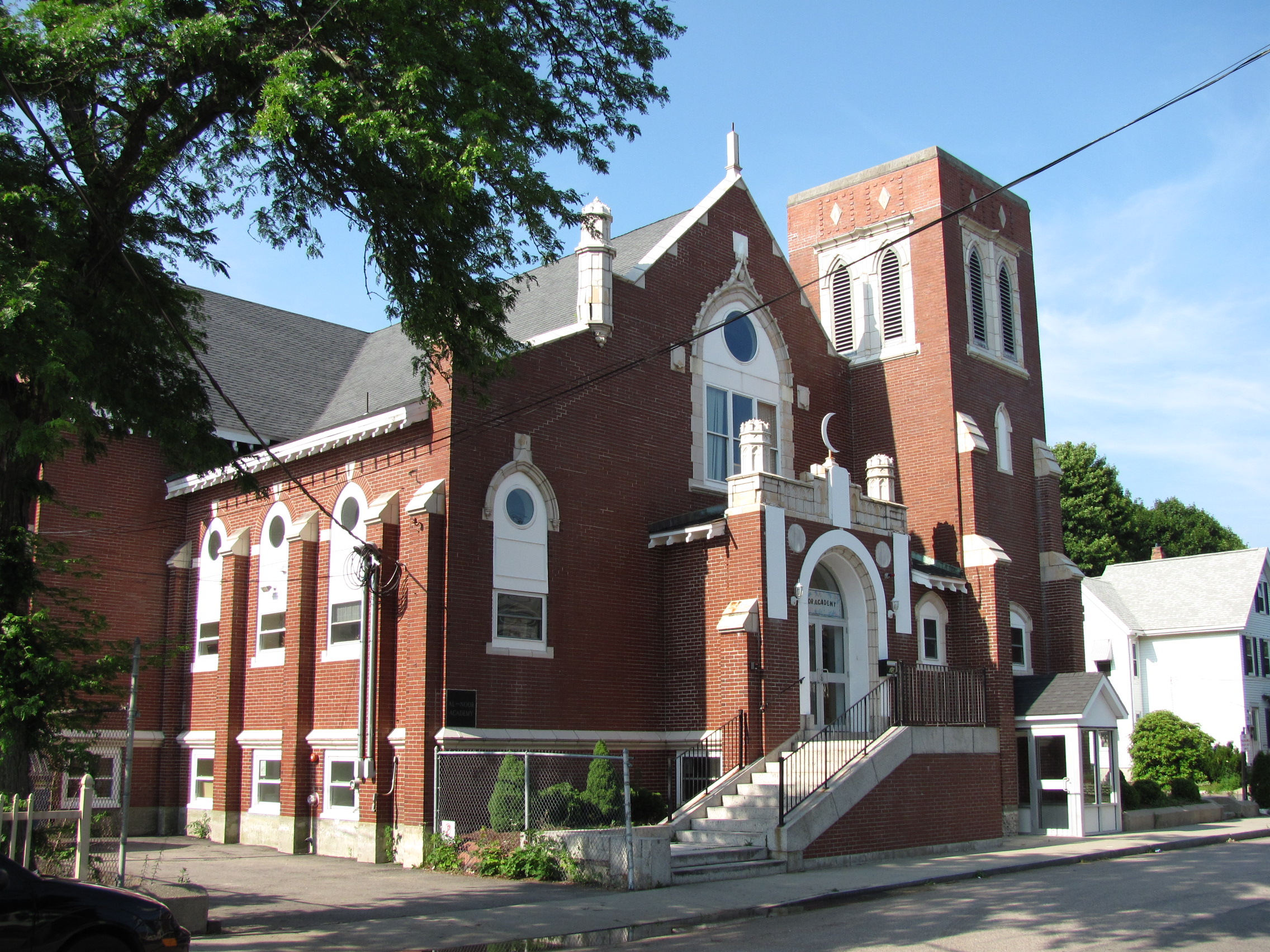
Al-Noor Academy in 2010

Al-Noor Academy (Arabic: أكاديمية النور, Academy of Light) is an Islamic middle and high school in Mansfield, Massachusetts. It is also associated with the Islamic Academy of New England - an elementary school in Sharon, Massachusetts.
