= Masjid Al-Noor (Tamale) =

Mosque in Tamale, Ghana

- Location within Ghana

Religion
- Affiliation: Islam
- Ecclesiastical or organisational status: Mosque
- Status: Active

Location
- Location: Sagnarigu Municipality, Northern Region
- Country: Ghana
- Interactive map of Masjid Al-Noor
- Coordinates: 9°24′12.3214″N 0°50′32.6976″W

Architecture
- Type: Mosque
- Founder: Mohammed Amin Adam
- Established: July 2026
- Capacity: 6,000

Website
- https://www.masjidalnoorghana.org/

The Al-Noor Mosque (Arabic: مسجد النور, Masjid al-Noor, also known as “The Light” mosque) is a mosque complex in Wayamba in the Sagnarigu Municipality of the Northern Region of Ghana. The mosque was commissioned by Mohammed Amin Adam.

== History ==
The mosque complex was built by Mohammed Amin Adam and inaugurated in July 2026 by Osman Nuhu Sharubutu and Mahamudu Bawumia.

The commissioning of the mosque was attended by notable personalities including Osman Nuhu Sharubutu, Mahamudu Bawumia, Alhassan Suhuyini, Ibrahim Ahmed Maqari, and Mohammed Bantima Samba (affectionately known as Chairman Samba) who is the Northern Regional Chairman of the New Patriotic Party.

== Facilities ==
The mosque complex has a 6,000 seater capacity complex which includes a school, library, dormitories, workers and guest residences, clinic with pharmacy and offices. It also has the Sheikh Adam Issah Centre for Islamic Research (SAICIR) and the Masjid Al-Noor Zakat Fund, Education and Scholarship Fund.

== Criticism ==
After the commissioning of the mosque complex, critics suggested funds used in establishing the mosque could be used in the establishment of factories to create jobs.

== See also ==
- Islam in Ghana
- List of mosques in Ghana
