= Al-Nour Mosque (Morocco) =

Mosque in Azrou, Morocco

Coordinates: 33.4365°N 5.2216°W

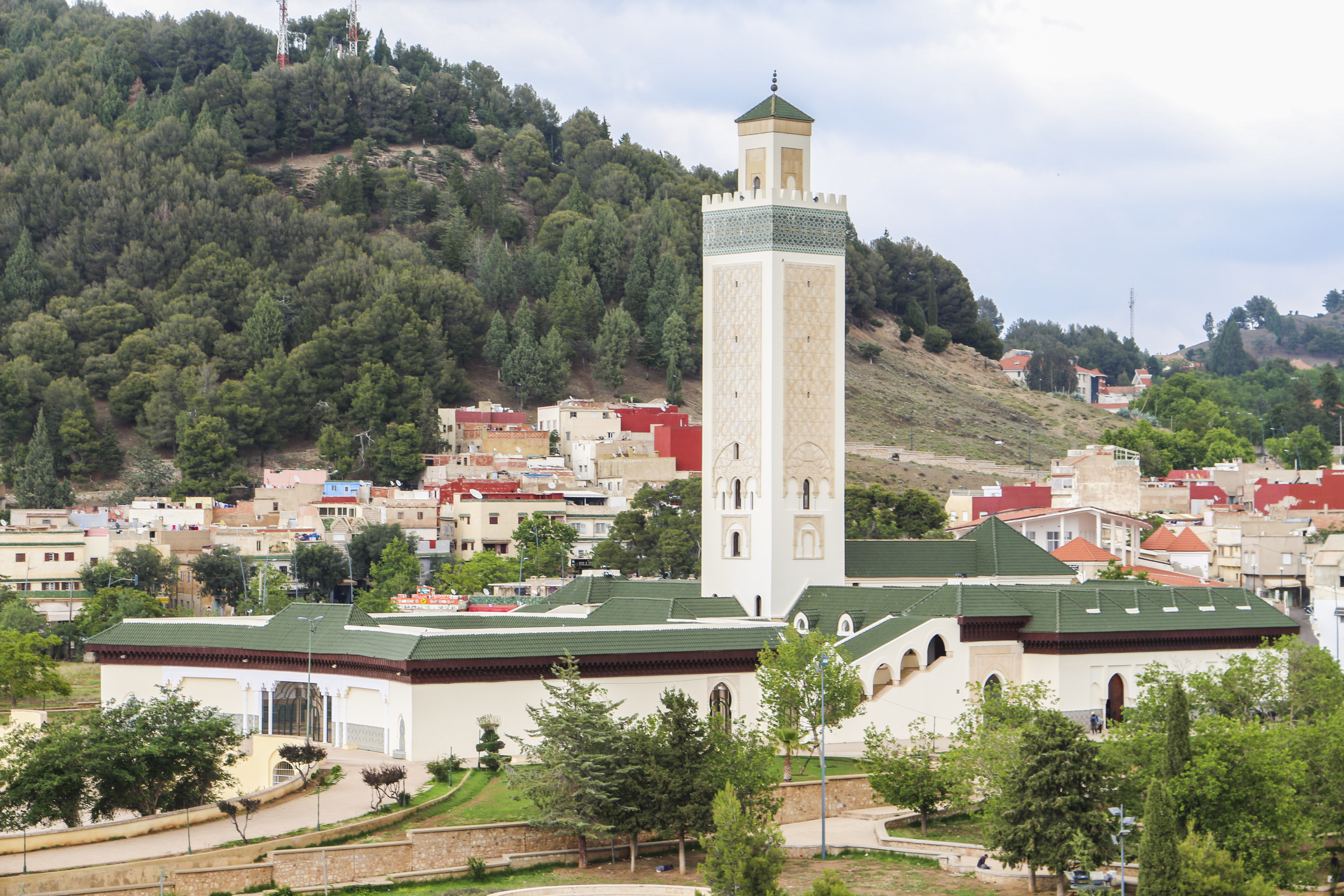

Location
- Interactive map of Al-Nour Mosque

Al-Nour Mosque (Arabic: مسجد النور) is a mosque located in the mountainous city of Azrou, in Ifrane Province, within the Fès-Meknès Region. It is the largest religious building in the Middle Atlas. The mosque was built by the late King Hassan II of Morocco in September 1987 and was inaugurated by King Mohammed VI of Morocco in 2000.

== Description ==
Al-Nour Mosque covers an area of 5,700 square meters and has a capacity of 5,000 worshippers. The mosque consists of two floors: the ground floor for men and the first floor for women. It also features a water fountain, an ablution area, and an additional open prayer space for overflow congregations. The construction budget for this mosque reached 1 billion dirhams, with an additional 15 million dirhams allocated for its furnishings.

== History ==
The construction of Al-Nour Mosque was initiated by King Hassan II in September 1987, but it faced significant delays. It was not inaugurated until December 2000 by King Mohammed VI, who later performed the Friday prayer there in September 2004.

== Photo Gallery ==
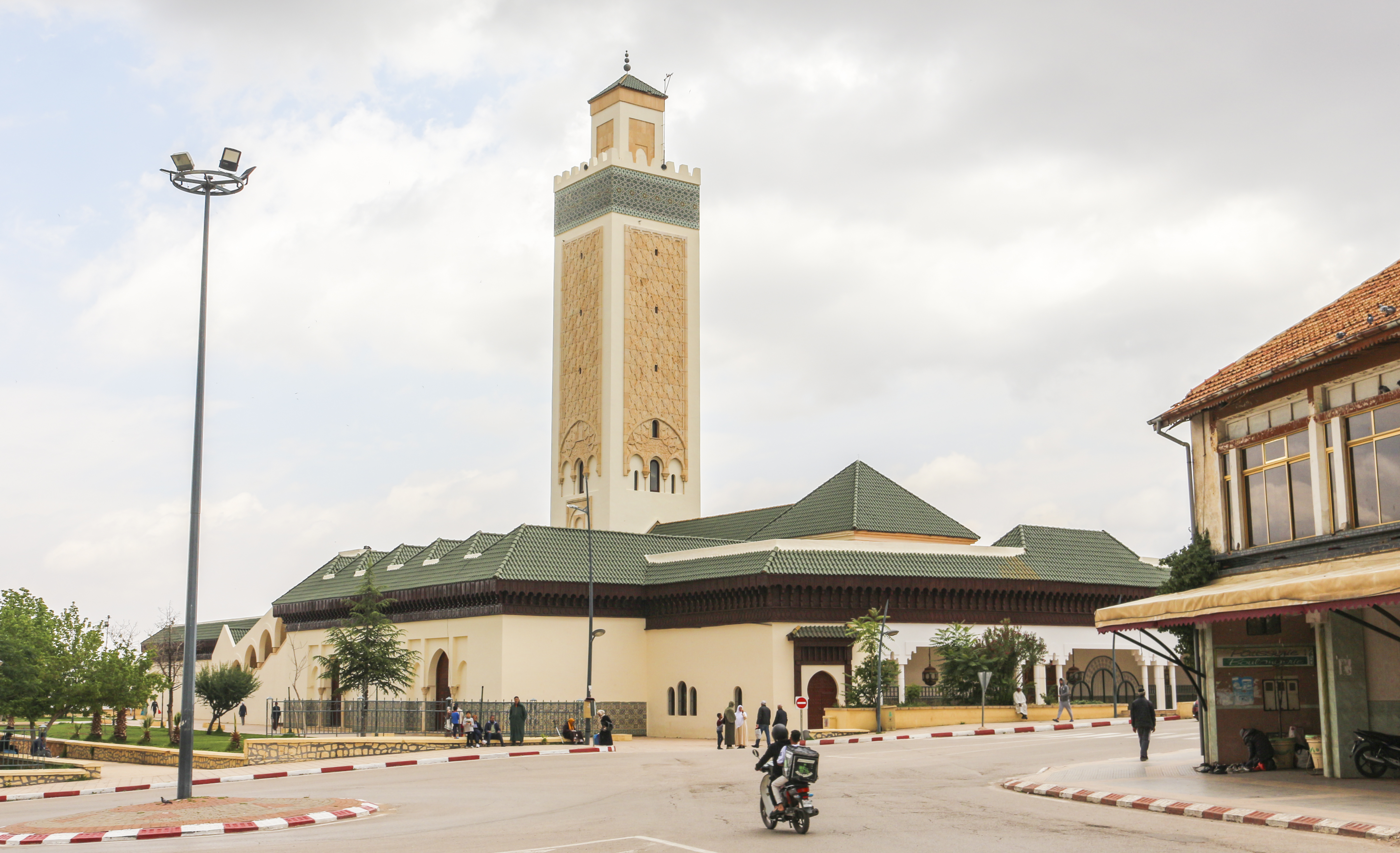

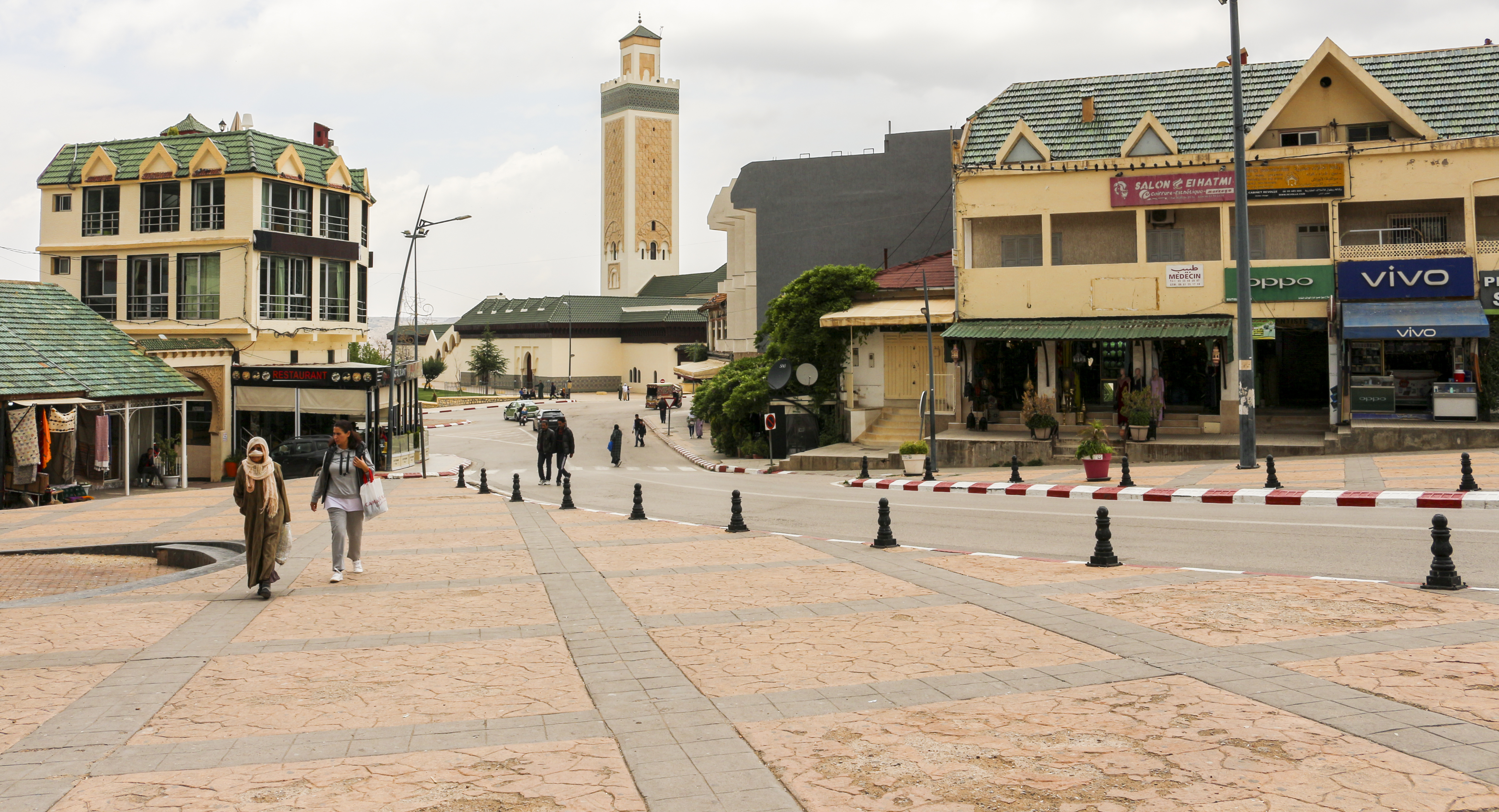

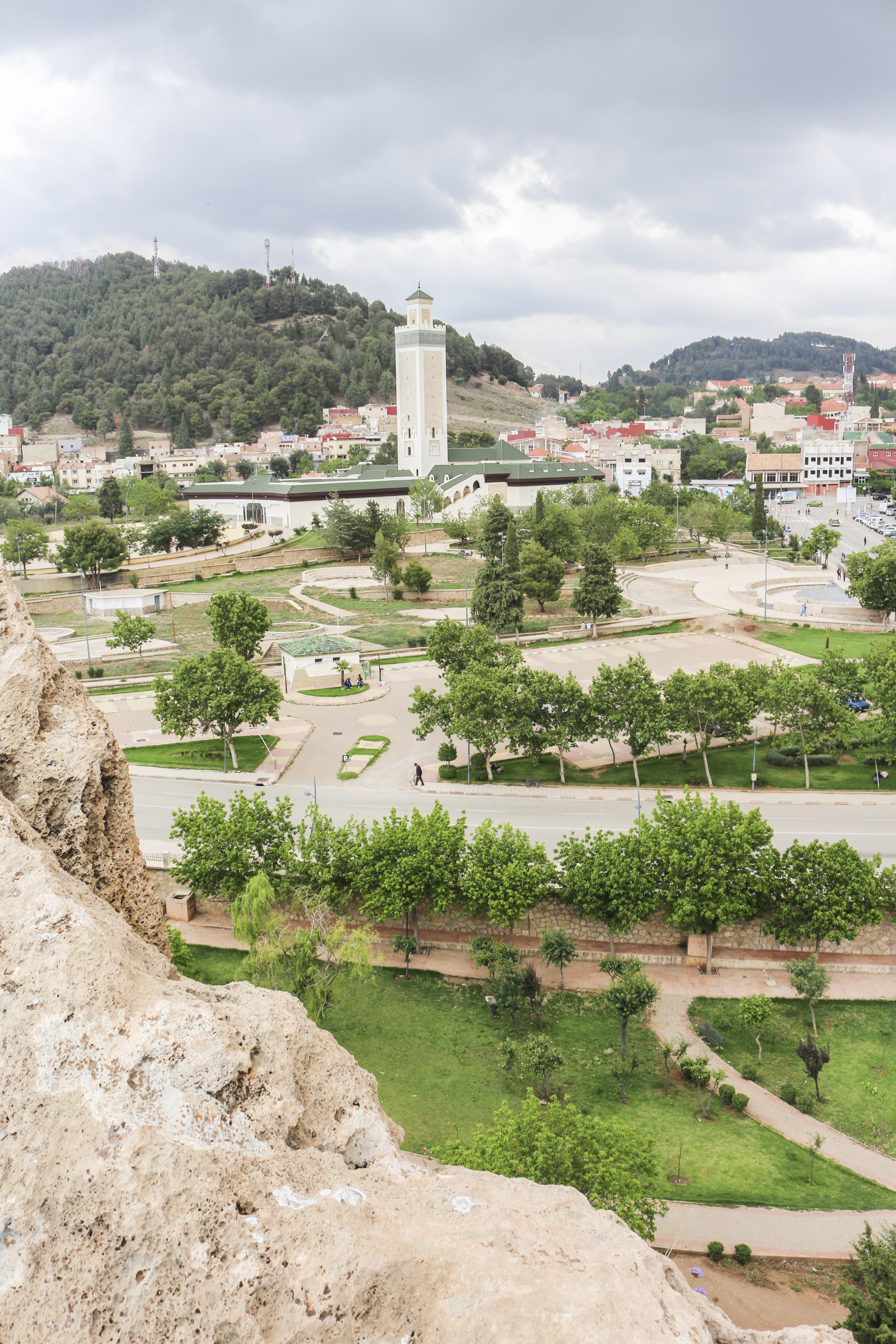

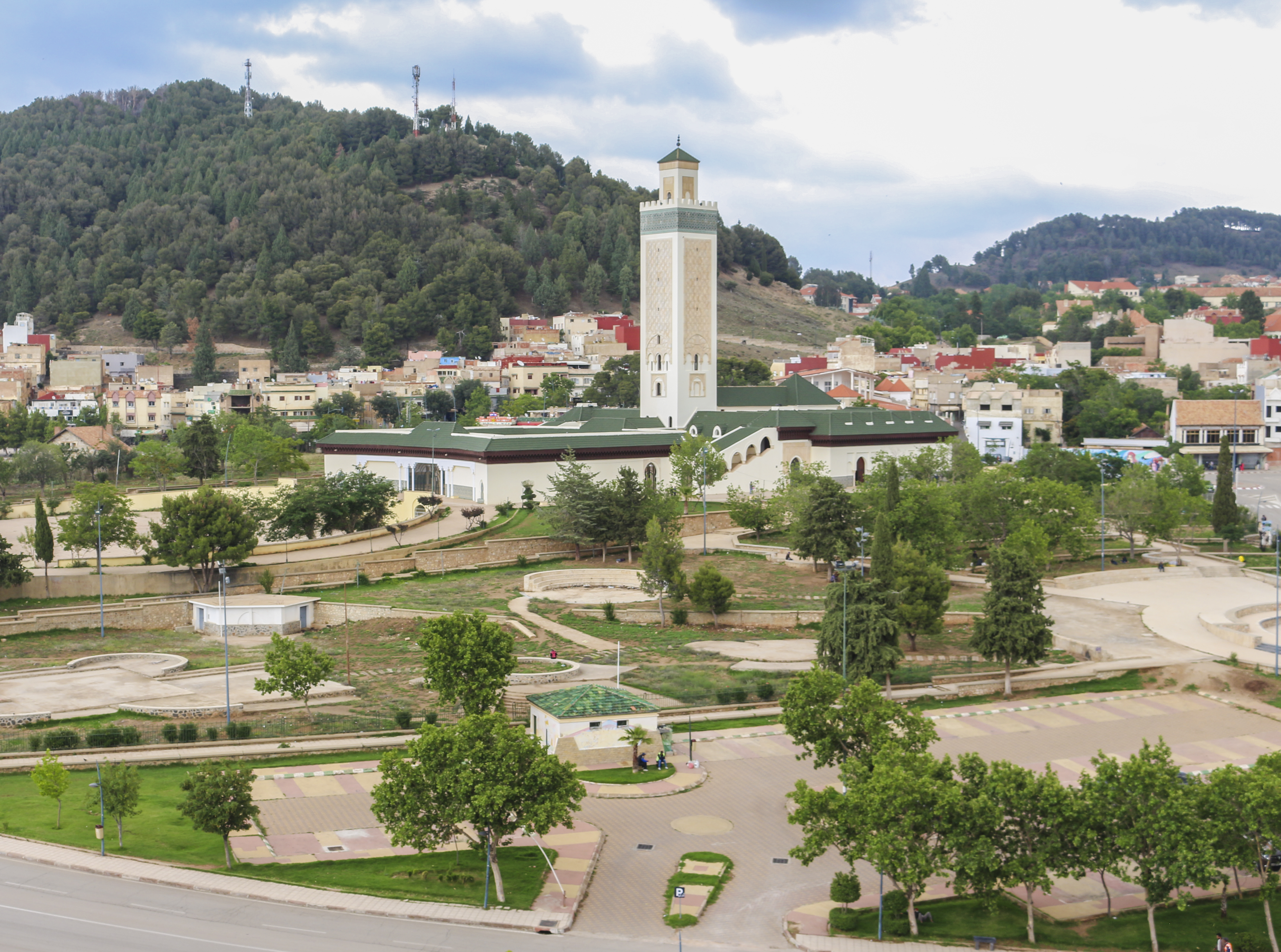

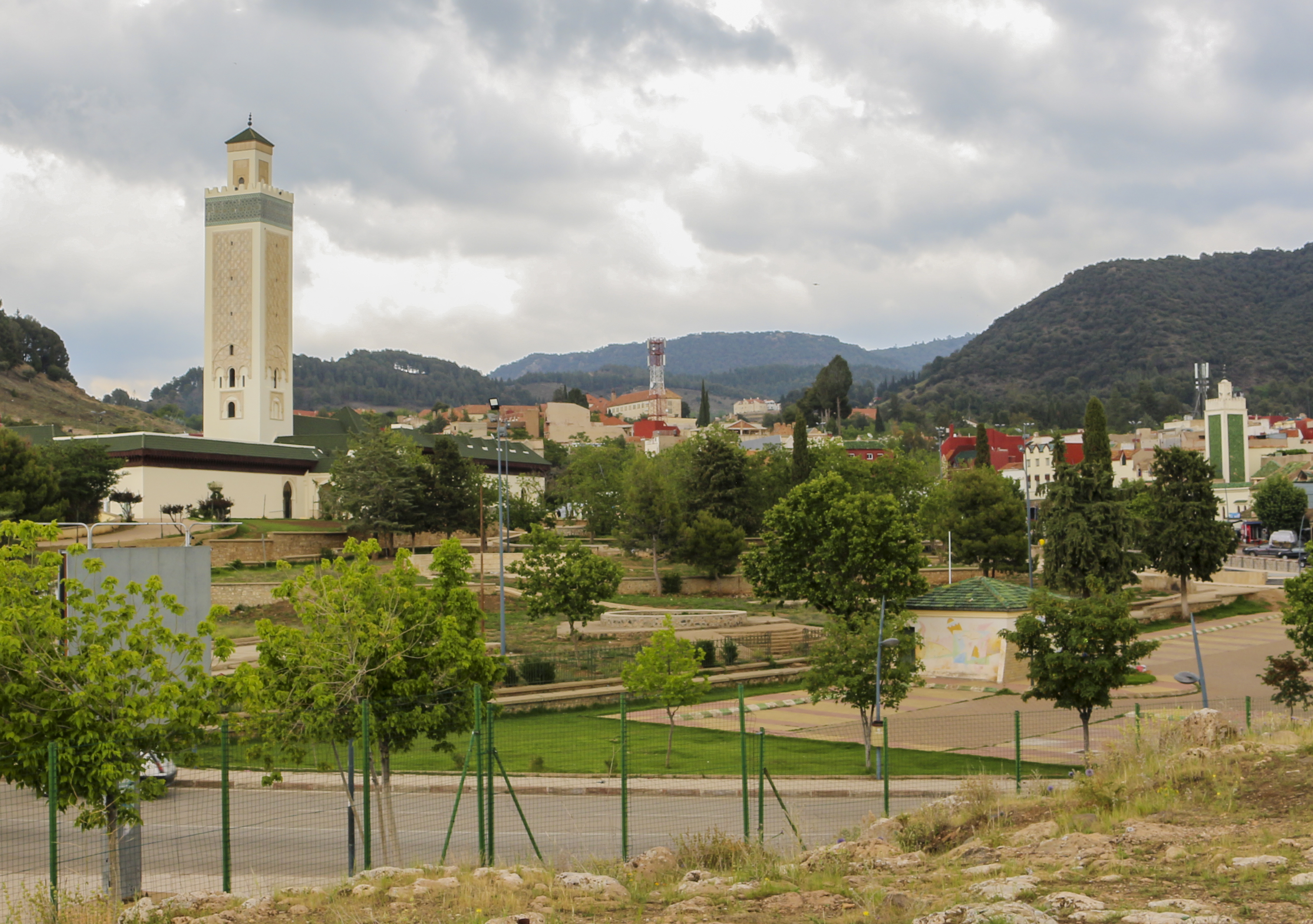

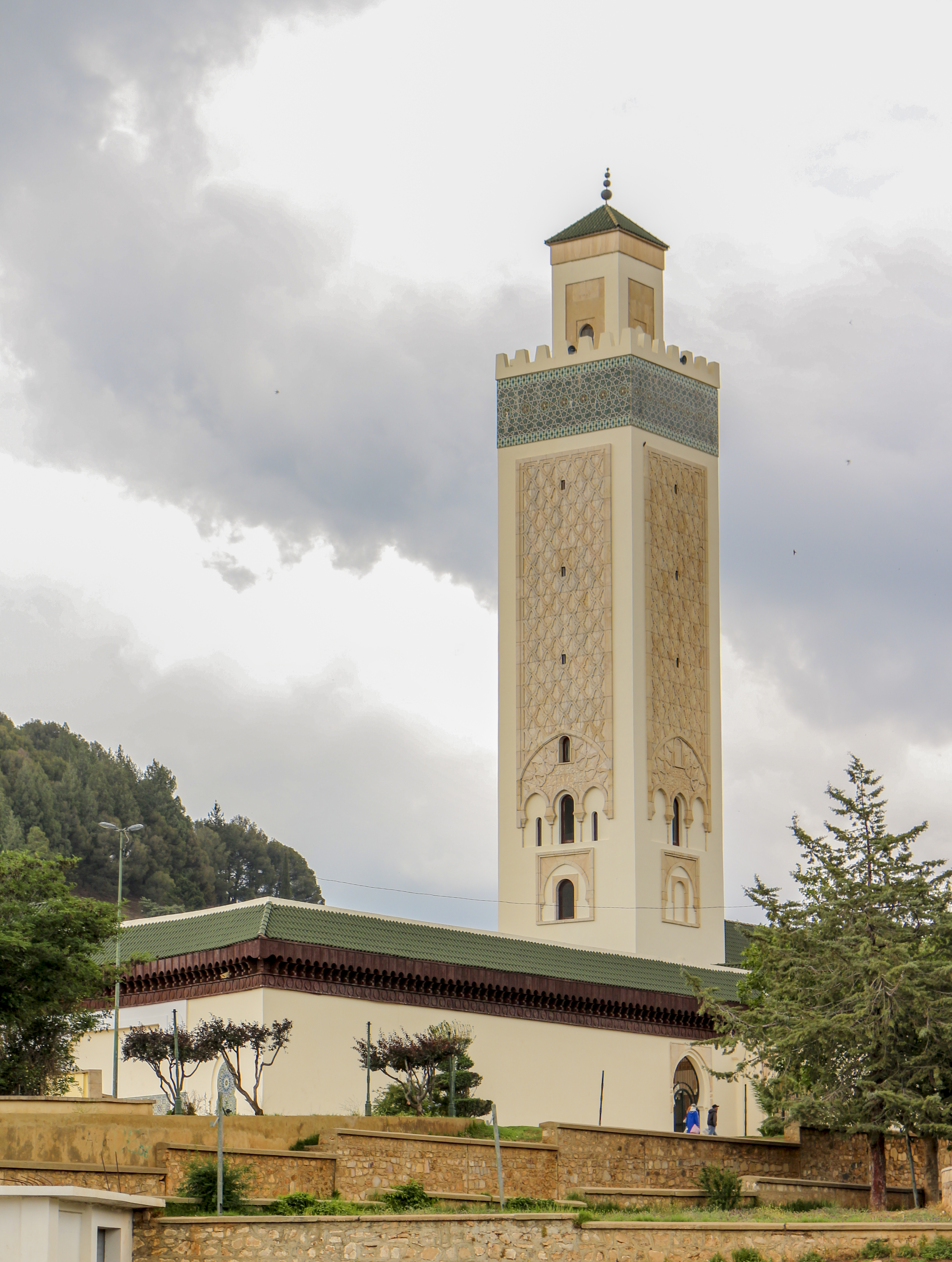
