= An-Nur Jamek Mosque, Labuan =

Mosque in Labuan, Malaysia

An-Nur Jamek Mosque
- Masjid Jamek An-Nur
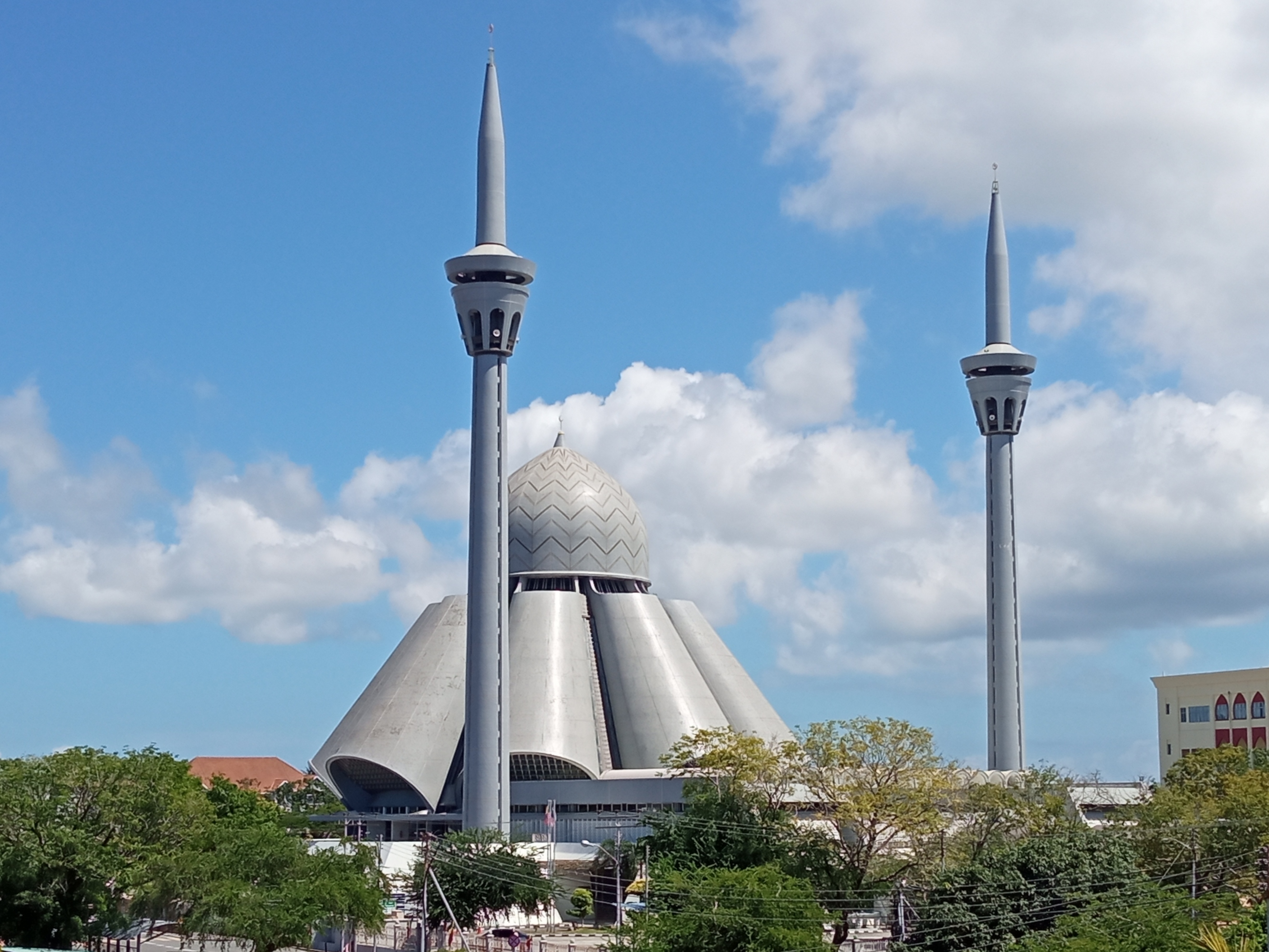

- Location within Malaysia

Religion
- Affiliation: Sunni Islam
- Ecclesiastical or organizational status: Mosque
- Status: Active

Location
- Location: Labuan
- Country: Malaysia
- Interactive map of An-Nur Jamek Mosque
- Coordinates: 5°17′00″N 115°14′51″E

Architecture
- Architects: Arkitek Jurubina Bertiga; Dato Baharuddin Abu Kassim
- Type: Mosque architecture
- Style: Brunei Malay; Ottoman
- Groundbreaking: 1982
- Completed: 1988

Specifications
- Dome: One
- Minaret: Two

The An-Nur Jamek Mosque, also known as the Masjid Jamek An-Nur, and sometimes called the Masjid Negeri Wilayah Persekutuan Labuan or State Federal Territory of Labuan Mosque, is a Sunni mosque, located in Labuan, Malaysia.

== History ==
Construction of the mosque was initially managed by the Sabah State Government through the Sabah Islamic Religious Council (MUIS). The mosque was built to replace the nearby old mosque. Construction commenced in 1982 and was completed in 1987. The mosque was opened on 1 February 1988 by the eighth Yang di-Pertuan Agong, Sultan Iskandar of Johor in conjunction with the 14th Federal Territory Day.

== Architecture ==
The architectural design was by Arkitek Jurubina Bertiga led by Dato Baharuddin Abu Kassim. The combination architecture are from Brunei Malay architectural elements mix with the Turkish architecture. As a result of these two influences has produced a new mosque with a unique and beautiful identity. The mosque is equipped with a dome and two tall minarets on both sides. The mosque is also equipped with a number of facilities and equipment for public use such as three lecture halls, the Darul Hikmah Library, administrative offices, and a breakout room for VIPs.

== See also ==
- Islam in Malaysia
- List of mosques in Malaysia
