= An-Noor Mosque (Guam) =

Mosque in Mangilao, Guam

- Arabic: مسجد النور
- Location of the mosque in Guam

Religion
- Affiliation: Sunni Islam
- Ecclesiastical or organizational status: Mosque
- Status: Active

Location
- Location: Mangilao, Guam
- Country: United States
- Interactive map of An-Noor Mosque
- Coordinates: 13°26′41.7″N 144°48′29.1″E

Architecture
- Type: Mosque architecture
- Established: 1990
- Completed: 2000
- Dome: One

The An-Noor Mosque (Arabic: مسجد النور), also known as Masjid An-Nur, is a Sunni Islam mosque in Mangilao, Guam, a territory of the United States.

== Overview ==
The Muslim Association of Guam was founded in 1990 and construction of the mosque started in 1997. It was then finished and opened in 2000 to become the only mosque in Guam.

External image
- https://dawa.center/islamic_centre/1737

The mosque regularly holds five daily prayers, Jumu'ah (also known as Jumu’aa), evening classes, and community gatherings.

== See also ==
- Islam in Guam
- List of mosques in the United States
