= An-Nur Kota Raya Mosque =

Mosque in Johor Bahru, Johor, Malaysia

An Nur Kotaraya Mosque
- Masjid An-Nur Kotaraya
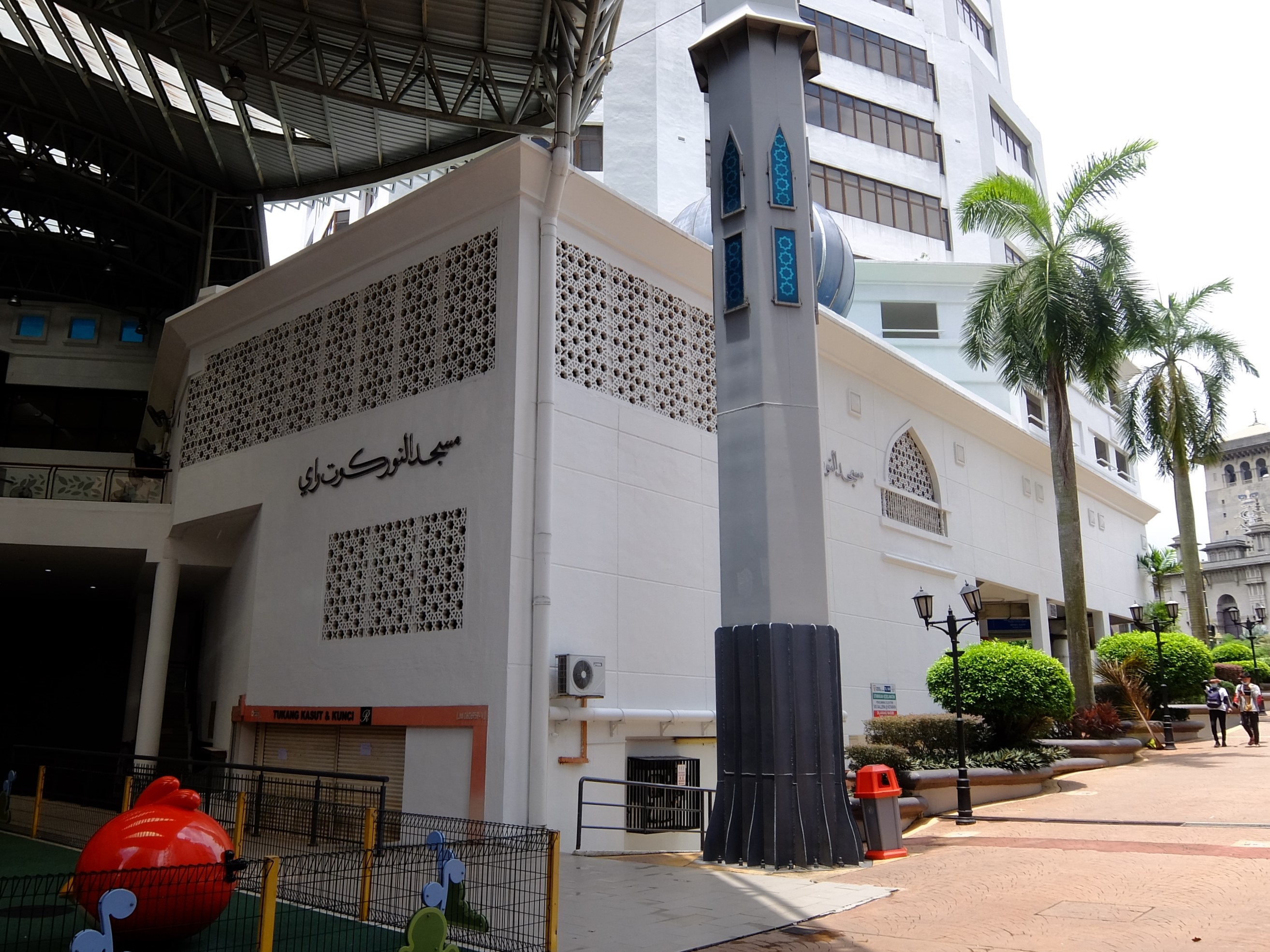

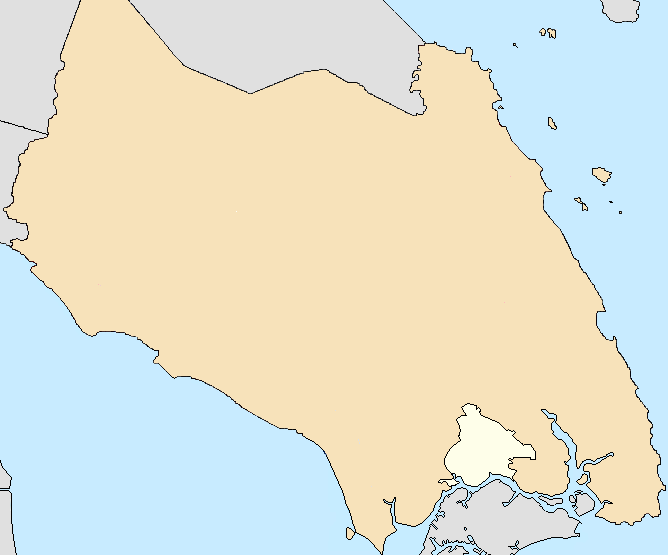
- Location within Johor Bahru

Religion
- Affiliation: Islam
- Branch/tradition: Sunni

Location
- Location: Johor Bahru, Johor, Malaysia
- Interactive map of An Nur Kotaraya Mosque
- Coordinates: 1°27′34″N 103°45′47″E

Architecture
- Type: mosque
- Minaret: 1

The An-Nur Kota Raya Mosque (Malay: Masjid An-Nur Kota Raya) is a mosque in Johor Bahru, Johor, Malaysia. It is located in the Galleria@Kotaraya Building, and is owned by Johor Corporation (J-Corp), the Johor state government's investment arm.

== See also ==
- Islam in Malaysia
