= Pasur, Coimbatore =

Pasur is a gram panchayat in the Coimbatore district of Tamil Nadu, India.

== History ==
The name Pasur literally means place of cows. It is also known as Kovil Nagaram, meaning temple town, because it has more than ten Hindu temples and also a mosque near by Allikulathottam.

Pasur has a history dated back to 14th century, when people settled in the area during the time of the Vijayanagara Empire.

The famous Koothu (story of prakalnath- Hindu god vishnu) is performed here during 18th centuries. Koothu (street dramas) by and by disappeared from village due to younger generation failed to continue the age old KOOTHU. Pasur is also famous for its vishnu Bajjans, every Saturday Bajjan's has been performed by famous singers of the village. Bajjans also slowly disappearing from village due to lack of interest among younger generation.

== Administration ==
There are six small villages in the Pasur panchayat:

- Pasur
- Kammala thotti palayam
- Kalakurichi
- Pudhu palayam
- Thokku palayam
- Ammachettipudur

== Facilities ==
Pasur has a government welfare middle school, Indian bank, post office, VAO office, Panchayat office, government funded society, shops, hotels and bakeries. It has connectivity to Coimbatore and Sathyamangalam, via National Highway 209, and Avinashi. The nearest town is Annur from where its easy to commute to places like Ooty (direct buses), Mettupalayam, Thiruppur and others. The nearest railway stations are at Coimbatore and Mettupalayam.

Nearby panchayaths are

- North East - Pongalore panchayat
- West - Annur, Mettupalayam
- South - Alla Palayam

Due to industrialization, Pasur developed rapidly during 2000 to 2010. The panchayat has four textile mills, an agriculture seed company and two engineering firms (automobile spares manufacturing companies in Kammala Thotti Palayam). There are also a few automobile companies, mainly LGB's (famous auto mobile company) subcontractors, are located in Kammala Thotti Palayam.

The people are mostly farmers and hand weavers but the younger generation are moving out to cities and abroad for jobs and higher studies..

== Festivals ==
Thai Pongal, chithirai kani - Tamil varuda pirappu, Ugadi and Amman kovil festival. Pongal has been celebrated grandly in Pasur, during pongal people from Pasur gather at Kuppayamman temple (200 years old small Amman temple) and do kummi kind of dance with singing song.
