= 1909 in architecture =

The year 1909 in architecture involved some significant events.

== Buildings and structures ==
=== Buildings ===
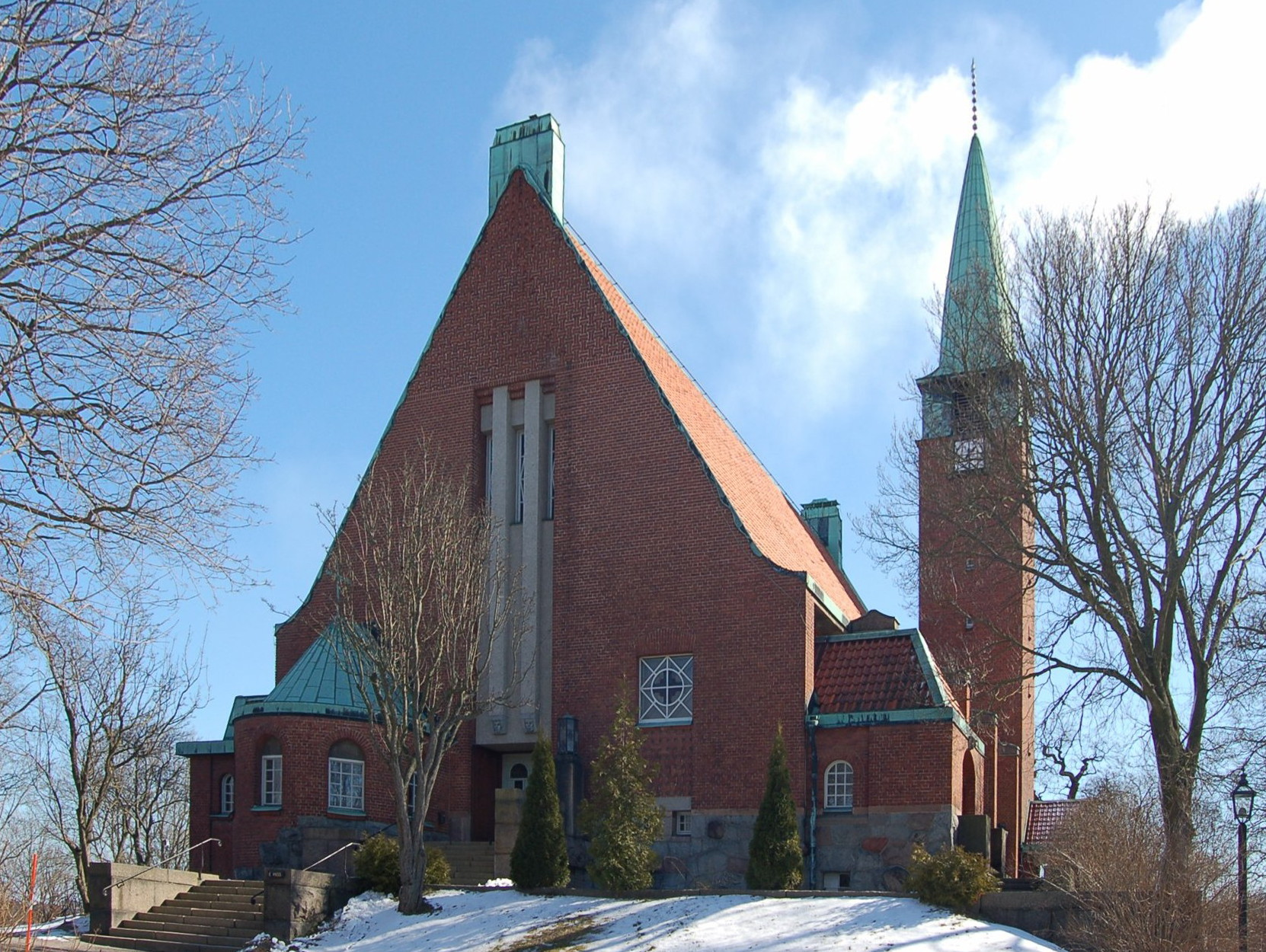
Hjorthagen Church in Stockholm, Sweden

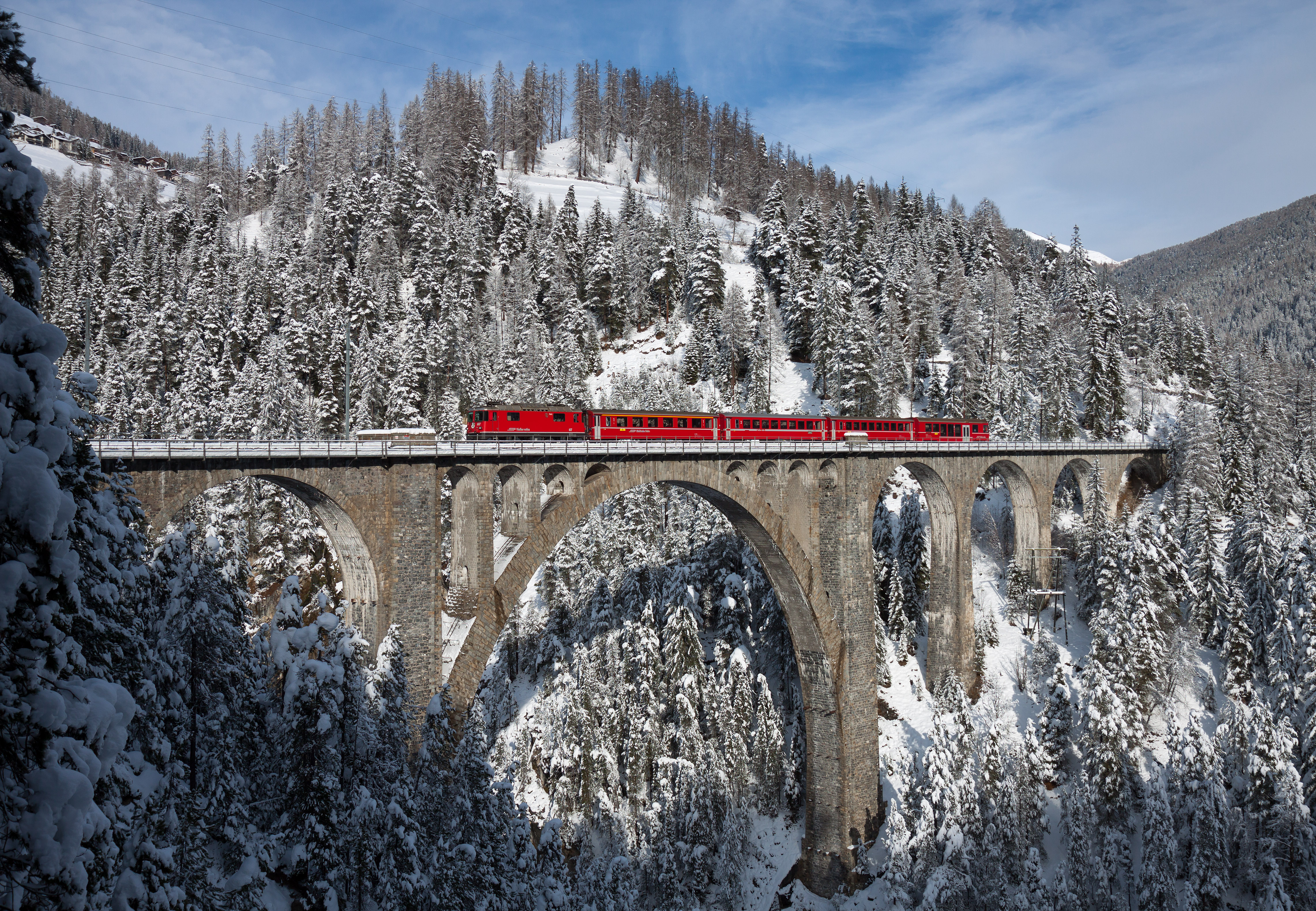
Wiesen Viaduct on the Rhaetian Railway in Switzerland

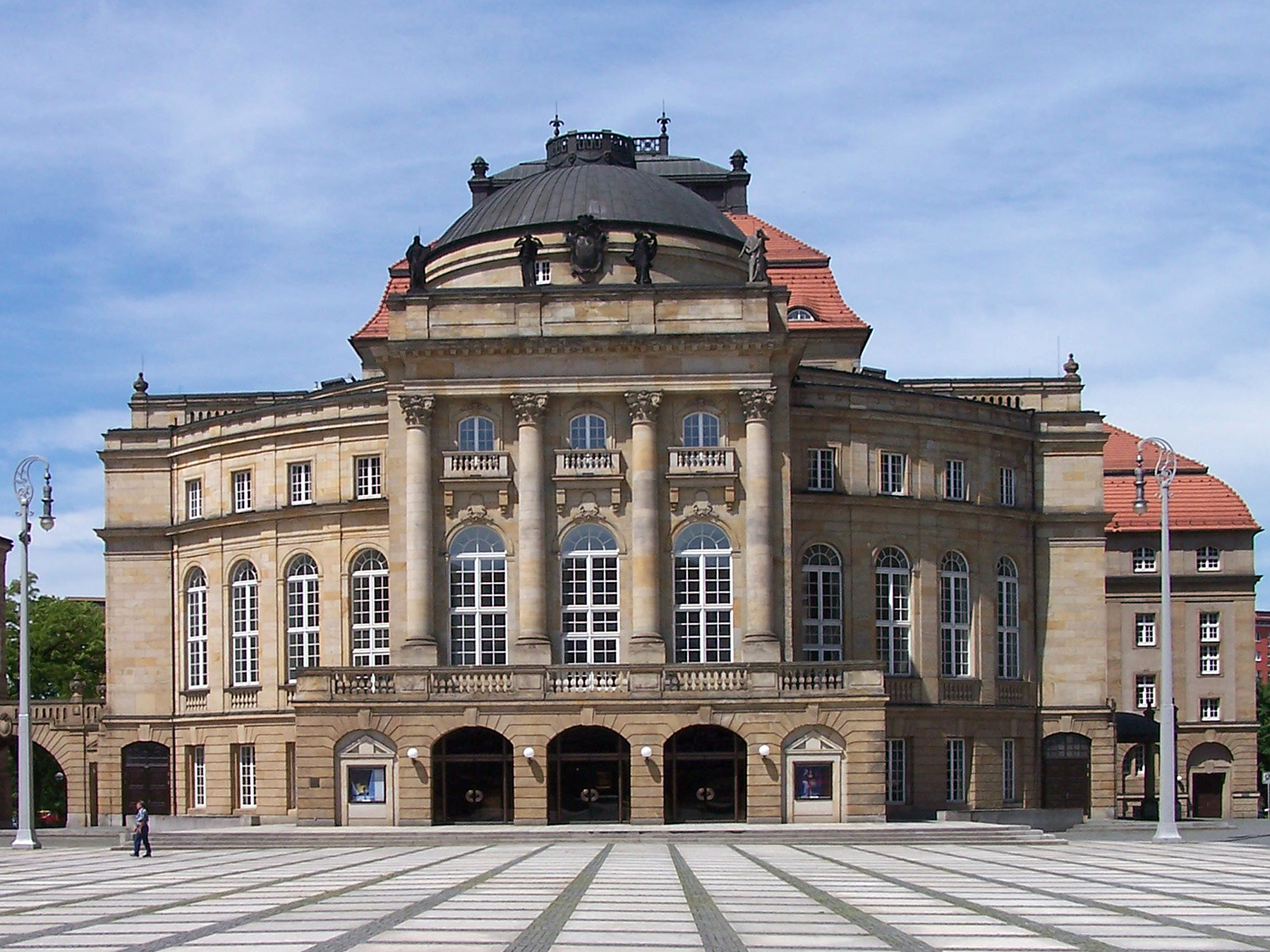
The Opernhaus Chemnitz in Germany

- February 28 – The Praetorian Building in Dallas, Texas, USA, opens to visitors.
- March 15 – Selfridges, Oxford Street, London department store, designed by American architect Daniel Burnham, opens.
- March 25 – Hjorthagen Church in Stockholm, Sweden, opens.
- March 30 – Queensboro Bridge in New York City, designed by Gustav Lindenthal in collaboration with Leffert L. Buck and Henry Hornbostel, opens.
- April 25 – A bomb blast damages St. Louis Cathedral (New Orleans).
- May 1 – Opening of the International Exhibition of the East of France, held in Nancy until October 31. Many architects of the École de Nancy, including Lucien Weissenburger, Émile André, Émile Toussaint, Louis Marchal, Paul Charbonnier, Eugène Vallin, and others design the pavilions for the exhibition.
- May 2 – St. Joseph, Wedding, Berlin, designed by Friar Wilhelm Rincklake, revised by Wilhelm Frydag, consecrated.
- July 1 – Wiesen Viaduct on the Rhaetian Railway in Switzerland, designed by Henning Friedrich, opens.
- July 14 – Teatro Municipal (Rio de Janeiro) opens.
- October 10 – Fades viaduct in France opens.
- October – United States Post Office, Courthouse, and Custom House (Spokane, Washington), designed under the supervision of James Knox Taylor, opens.
- November 8 – Boston Opera House in the United States opens.
- November 25 – Bucharest Russian Church sanctified.
- Catholic Cathedral of the Madeleine in Salt Lake City, Utah, designed by Carl M. Neuhausen and Bernard O. Mecklenburg, completed.
- Basílica del Voto Nacional in Quito, Ecuador, designed by Emilio Tarlier, completed.
- Holy Myrrhbearers Cathedral in Baku, Azerbaijan, built.
- St. Nicholas Roman Catholic Church in Kyiv, completed by Władysław Horodecki to a design of Stanisław Wołowski, consecrated.
- Saint-Édouard Church in Montreal, Quebec, designed by Joseph-Ovide Turgeon, completed.
- Novi Sad Synagogue in Serbia, designed by Baumhorn Lipót, completed.
- Façade of San Silvestro, Venice, designed by Giuseppe Sicher, completed.
- Grand Post Office in Istanbul, Turkey, designed by Vedat Tek, completed.
- United States Post Offices in New York State at Corning, Ithaca and Little Falls, designed under the supervision of James Knox Taylor, completed.
- Opernhaus Chemnitz in Germany, designed by Richard Möbius, completed.
- Higgins Building in Los Angeles completed.
- Corinthian Hall (Robert A. Long House) in Kansas City, Missouri, designed by Henry Hoit of Hoit, Price and Barnes, completed.
- Construction work begins on the Robie House, designed by Frank Lloyd Wright, in Hyde Park, Chicago.
- Construction work begins on Rodmarton Manor, designed by Ernest Barnsley, in Gloucestershire, England.

== Awards ==
- AIA Gold Medal – Charles Follen McKim.
- RIBA Royal Gold Medal – Arthur John Evans.
- Grand Prix de Rome, architecture: Maurice Boutterin.

== Births ==
- March 16 – Ernesto Nathan Rogers, Italian architect, writer and educator (died 1969)
- April 25 – William Pereira, American architect (died 1985)
- May 9 – Gordon Bunshaft, American architect (died 1990)
- October 25 – Moshe Mayer, Romanian Jewish architect (died 1993)
- Genia Averbuch, Russian Jewish architect (died 1977)

== Deaths ==
- September 14 – Charles Follen McKim, American Beaux-Arts architect (born 1847)
- September 18 – Auguste Choisy, French architectural historian (born 1841)
- November 9 – Thomas Worthington, English architect associated with public buildings in Manchester (born 1826)
- November 24 – James Ebenezer Saunders, English architecture (born 1829/30)
