= 1993 in architecture =

The year 1993 in architecture involved some significant architectural events and new buildings.

== Events ==
- August 18 – The 14th century Kapellbrücke covered wooden truss bridge in Lucerne (Switzerland) is largely destroyed by fire; rebuilding begins almost immediately.
- Philip Dowson becomes President of the Royal Academy.
- Architekturzentrum Wien founded in Austria.
- van Heyningen and Haward Architects practice formed in London.

== Buildings and structures ==
=== Buildings opened ===
- February 23 – Guildford Spectrum, UK
- September 4 – Immaculate Conception Cathedral, Managua, Nicaragua, designed by Ricardo Legorreta
- Het Nieuwe Instituut, Rotterdam, designed by Jo Coenen

=== Buildings completed ===
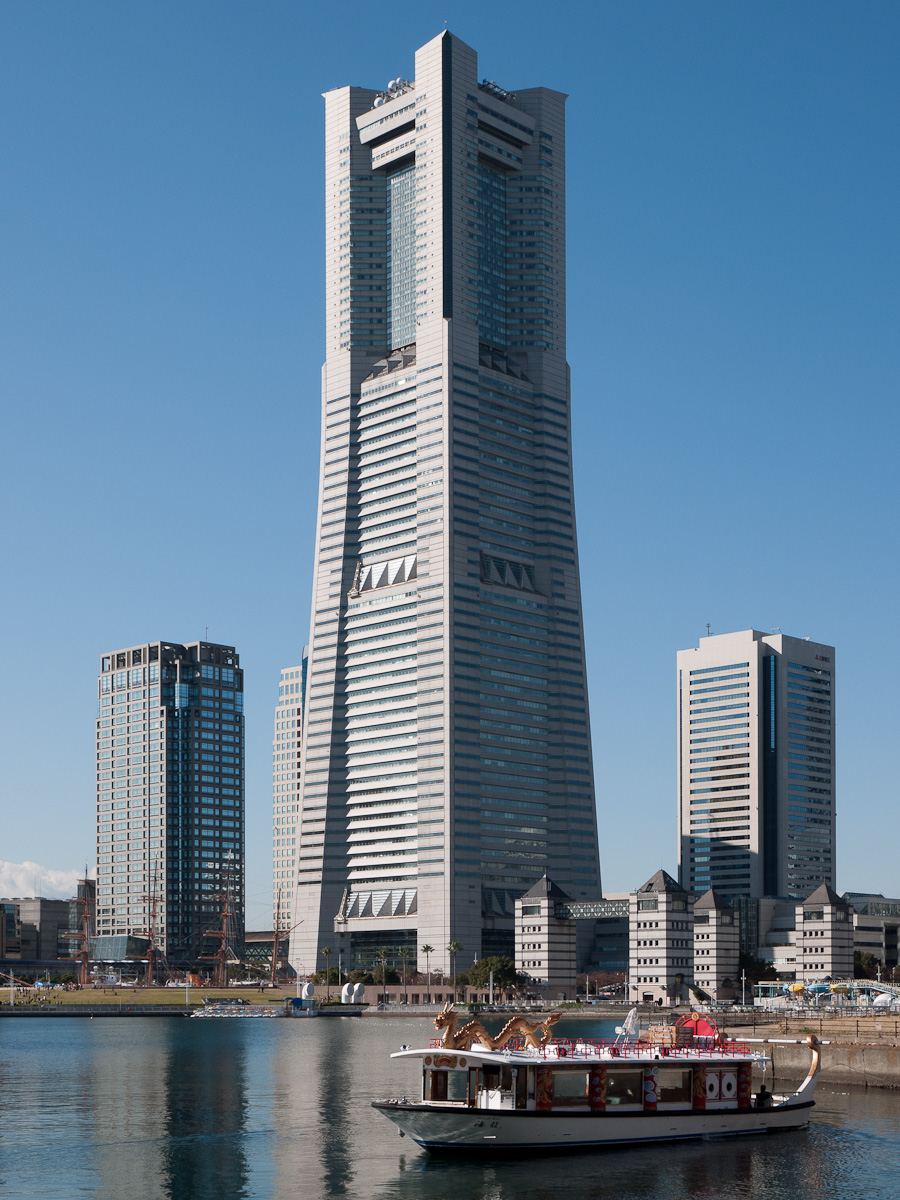
Yokohama Landmark Tower

- The Landmark Tower in Yokohama, Japan.
- Hassan II Mosque, Casablanca, Morocco, designed by Michel Pinseau and built by Bouygues.
- Hämeenkylä Church, Vantaa, Finland, designed by Jokela & Kareoja.
- Inner shrine, Ise, Mie, Mie Prefecture, Japan.
- Sanctuary of Divine Mercy (Sanktuarium Miłosierdzia Bożego), Kalisz, Poland (designed 1958; building commenced 1977).
- Museum of Byzantine Culture, Thessaloniki, Greece.
- The Umeda Sky Building in Osaka City, Japan.
- Governor Phillip Tower, Sydney, Australia, by architects Denton Corker Marshall.
- Cave of Niaux visitor entrance in Ariège (department), France, designed by Massimiliano Fuksas.

=== Construction began ===
- The Zeitpyramide (time pyramid) in Wemding, Germany. Scheduled to be completed in the year 3183.

== Awards ==
- AIA Gold Medal – Thomas Jefferson (posthumous).
- Architecture Firm Award – Cambridge Seven Associates, Inc.
- Grand Prix de l'urbanisme – Bernard Huet.
- Grand prix national de l'architecture – Dominique Perrault.
- Praemium Imperiale Architecture Laureate – Kenzo Tange.
- Pritzker Prize – Fumihiko Maki.
- RAIA Gold Medal – Ken Woolley.
- RIBA Royal Gold Medal – Giancarlo de Carlo.
- Twenty-five Year Award – Deere & Company Administrative Center.
- UIA Gold Medal – Fumihiko Maki.

== Deaths ==
- March 27 – Paul László, Hungarian American architect (born 1900)
- June 27 – Paul Thiry, American architect (born 1904)
- July 13 – Alan McCullough, American modernist architect (born c.1909)
- August 16 – Alison Smithson, English architect (born 1928)
- August 19 – Norman Jaffe, American residential architect (born 1932)
- September 23 – Moshe Mayer, Romanian Israeli architect (born 1909)
- October 24 – Arthur T. Brown, American architect (born 1900)
- December 16 – Charles Moore, American architect (born 1925)
