= Village Ivoire =

Ivory Coast hospitality and entertainment district

- Interactive map of the Village Ivoire area

General information
- Location: Boulevard Hassan II, Cocody, 8th arrondissement, Abidjan, Côte d'Ivoire
- Coordinates: 5.3271°N 4.0048°W

Village Ivoire is a hospitality and entertainment district located on the banks of the Ébrié Lagoon, in the Cocody commune of Abidjan, Côte d'Ivoire. Its original building and centerpiece is Hôtel Ivoire, a luxury hotel. A prestige project for the young independent nation of Côte d'Ivoire, the district earned international notice for its lavish amenities, among them a now-closed artificial ice rink which was considered the first of its kind in the West African region. Shortly after its completion, a New York Times article called the Ivoire "sui generis, perhaps Africa's most dazzling hotel".

== Hôtel Ivoire ==
=== History ===
During a 1960 visit to eastern neighbor Liberia, Félix Houphouët-Boigny, president of Côte d'Ivoire and mayor of Abidjan, was impressed with his accommodations at Monrovia's Ducor Palace Hotel. He hired Israeli Moshe Mayer, the developer of that establishment, to create a new one that would upstage it, and compete with the world's best. Like the Ducor, the Ivoire was part of the Inter-Continental chain, then a subsidiary of Pan American Airways.
The project's first phase saw the opening of the main building in 1963. A tower was built next to it in 1969, and a third batch of rooms was added to the main building in 1972, the final extension to the hotel itself.

The Ivoire lost some of its luster as the country's economy slumped and political unrest intensified during the 1990s, leading to Inter-Continental's withdrawal in 2002. At the height of the First Ivorian Civil War in 2004, it was the scene of a clash between supporters of Ivorian president Laurent Gbagbo and French soldiers of the UNOCI (see 2004 French–Ivorian clashes), which resulted in the killing of two demonstrators by French forces. These events established the hotel as a symbol of the Gbagbo regime. He later celebrated his nomination for the 2010 presidential election, as well as the creation of his new party, at Village Ivoire's Congress Center, not far from the location of the standoff. Gbagbo set up his personal surveillance unit —a detachment of the Israeli secret services— inside the hotel, and gave his militia, the Young Patriots, free access to the complex, which eventually led to degradations and an almost complete loss of patronage.

Société des palaces de Cocody (SDPC), the hotel's public ownership company, assumed direct control of it between 2002 and 2009, when management was transferred to Ivorian-Lebanese developer Pierre Fakhoury for an extensive rebuild aimed at restoring its standing and attracting a new operator. For his work on the Ivoire and other Ivorian public buildings, Fakhoury received rights to a share of the country's oil reserves at much lower than market value, an unusual business agreement that attracted scrutiny from the IMF. In 2012, an agreement was signed with French multinational Accor to manage the hotel as part of its premium Sofitel brand. Most refurbishments were completed by 2015.

=== In popular culture ===
Despite their checkered history, Hôtel Ivoire and Village Ivoire have remained an emblem of the country's most prosperous era, and a sought-after destination for the Ivorian population. While only an affluent minority can afford a stay, it is frequent for newlyweds and visitors from the provinces to come to the village and get photographed in the hotel's gardens.

The Ivoire has hosted such international personalities as Michael Jackson, Stevie Wonder, Kofi Annan, Nelson Mandela, King Juan Carlos I, Jacques Chirac, Rihanna and Ronaldinho.

Hôtel Ivoire was the central location of the inaugural Rallye Côte d'Ivoire in 1969, hosting the pre-race draw, finish line and closing banquet. It remained one of the event's key locations in subsequent years.

=== Amenities ===
Sofitel Abidjan – Hôtel Ivoire
- Interactive map of the Sofitel Abidjan – Hôtel Ivoire area
- Former names: Hôtel Ivoire Inter-Continental; Hôtel Ivoire

General information
- Type: Hotel
- Inaugurated: 7 September 1963 (original building); 15 May 2015 (completed renovation)
- Renovated: 2009–15
- Owner: Société des palaces de Cocody
- Landlord: Accor

Height
- Height: 100 metres (330 ft)

Technical details
- Floor count: 17 (original building); 24 (tower)

Design and construction
- Architects: Heinz Fenchel; Thomas Leitersdorf; William Pereira
- Developer: Moshe Mayer (original); Pierre Fakhoury (renovation)
- Awards: Relais de Champagne (1968)

Website
- Official website

==== Rooms ====
At its inception, the main building had 220 rooms. The tower's opening added a further 242 rooms. 1972's third extension brought the hotel to a peak of 750 rooms. The refurbished version that opened in 2015, after a large scale interior remodelling, has 423 rooms.

==== Restaurants ====
The hotel proper —not counting the casino— has four restaurants. The best known is Le Toit d'Abidjan (English: 'The Top of Abidjan'), billed as "Abidjan's highest restaurant", which sits on the twenty-third floor of the hotel's tower.

==== Cinema ====
Cinema Ivoire was a film theater located inside the hotel's main building. Abandoned during the mid-2000s, it reopened in 2015 in a 407-seat configuration, as part of new local chain Majestic One. The renovated version is the first 3D projection theater in Côte d'Ivoire.

==== Shopping gallery ====
In addition to the trade center located east of the hotel, the main building has an eleven store shopping arcade.

Casino Barrière – Éléphant d’or
- Interactive map of Casino Barrière – Éléphant d’or
- Location: Cocody, Abidjan, Côte d'Ivoire
- Opened: September 1970 (inauguration ceremony)
- Theme: West African
- Notable restaurants: L'Éléphant d’or
- Owner: Société des palaces de Cocody
- Operating license holder: Groupe Lucien Barrière
- Previous names: L'Éléphant d’or
- Renovated in: 2017
- Website: Official website

== Other village facilities ==
=== Lagoon pool ===
A 7,000 square metres (75,000 sq ft) lagoon-style swimming pool that could once be navigated with motorized bumper boats.

=== Casino ===
L'Éléphant d’or (English: 'The Golden Elephant') casino was established by a December 1969 law. The same law attempted to prevent gambling-related risks by restricting access to gaming tables to foreign citizens (Ivorians could still play lower stake games like jackpot machines). Nonetheless, the casino was the village's last remaining moneymaker after the Civil War, only closing in 2008. It reopened in May 2017, now managed by Groupe Lucien Barrière. Barrière and the SPDC lobbied for the 1969 access restrictions to be repelled, which was granted in 2021. The building, shaped like a group of traditional African huts, also houses an eponymous restaurant.

=== Convention Center ===
Palais des congrès
- Interactive map of Palais des congrès
- Former names: Palais des congrès Houphoüet-Boigny
- Owner: Société des palaces de Cocody

Construction
- Renovated: 2009–10
- Architect: Moshe Mayer

The Palais des Congrès Houphoüet-Boigny was added to the complex in 1973, and offered room for 1200 to 2100 guests depending on the configuration. An extensive renovation was completed in 2010, with seating improvements resulting in a reduced capacity of 1650.

=== Ivoire Trade Center ===
The latest addition to the complex, the building is split between of 13,000 m^{2} of corporate offices and 4,000 m^{2} of retail space at the bottom floor, mostly consisting of middle market shops. Envisioned to be completed as early as 2001, the project stalled before the terrain was sold for completion to Pierre Fakhoury in 2018. The SPDC attempted to block the sale, which it considered premature based on interest expressed by other investors, but was overruled by the Ivorian government, with whom Fakhoury has a long-standing relationship. Inaugurated in late 2021.

=== Central Tennis Club ===
Originally a three-court facility, it has grown to eleven courts. It is slated to undergo a partial transformation to clay, which will make it the first international facility to receive the "Roland Garros" label, an infrastructure standard introduced by organizers of the French Tennis Open.

=== Port Ivoire ===
A private pier and helipad.

== Former facilities ==
=== Nightclub ===
During the village's heyday, a nightclub called Zippo was located on the premises.

=== Bowling center ===
Opened in 1968 at a cost of more than $1 million, this additional building featured a gaming space with pool tables and a ten-lane Brunswick bowling alley, and a wellness space featuring a sauna and a gymnasium. The bowling installation was not retained as part of Village Ivoire's renovation.

=== Ice rink ===
An ice rink opened in 1970, but fell into disrepair during the economic recession of the 1990s and was left off the village's renovation efforts. The building still stands, but is only used as a banquet hall.
