= Orthlieb Pool =

Former swimming pool in Casablanca, Morocco

- Interactive map of Orthlieb Pool
- Coordinates: 33.6085°N 7.6327°W
- Dimensions: Length: 480 m (1,574 ft); Width: 75 m (246 ft)

Construction
- Opened: 1934
- Demolished: 1986
- Architect: Maurice L'Herbier

The Orthlieb Pool, also called the Centre Balnéaire Georges Orthlieb or Casablanca municipal swimming pool (Arabic: مسبح الدار البيضاء البلدي), was a seawater swimming pool built in the rocks along the road from Ain Diab to Casablanca in Morocco. At 480 m (1,574 ft) long and 75 m (246 ft) wide, it was once considered the largest swimming pool in the world.

The swimming pool and bathing center took three years to build, and the facility was inaugurated on July 14, 1934. It was designed by the architect Maurice L'Herbier and named for Georges Orthlieb, a municipal leader in Casablanca. Following the independence of Morocco, the pool fell into disrepair. In 1986, the site was destroyed to make way for construction of the Hassan II Mosque.

== See also ==
- List of largest swimming pools
