= Hassan II Mosque =

Mosque in Casablanca, Morocco

- A view of the mosque from the adjacent promenade

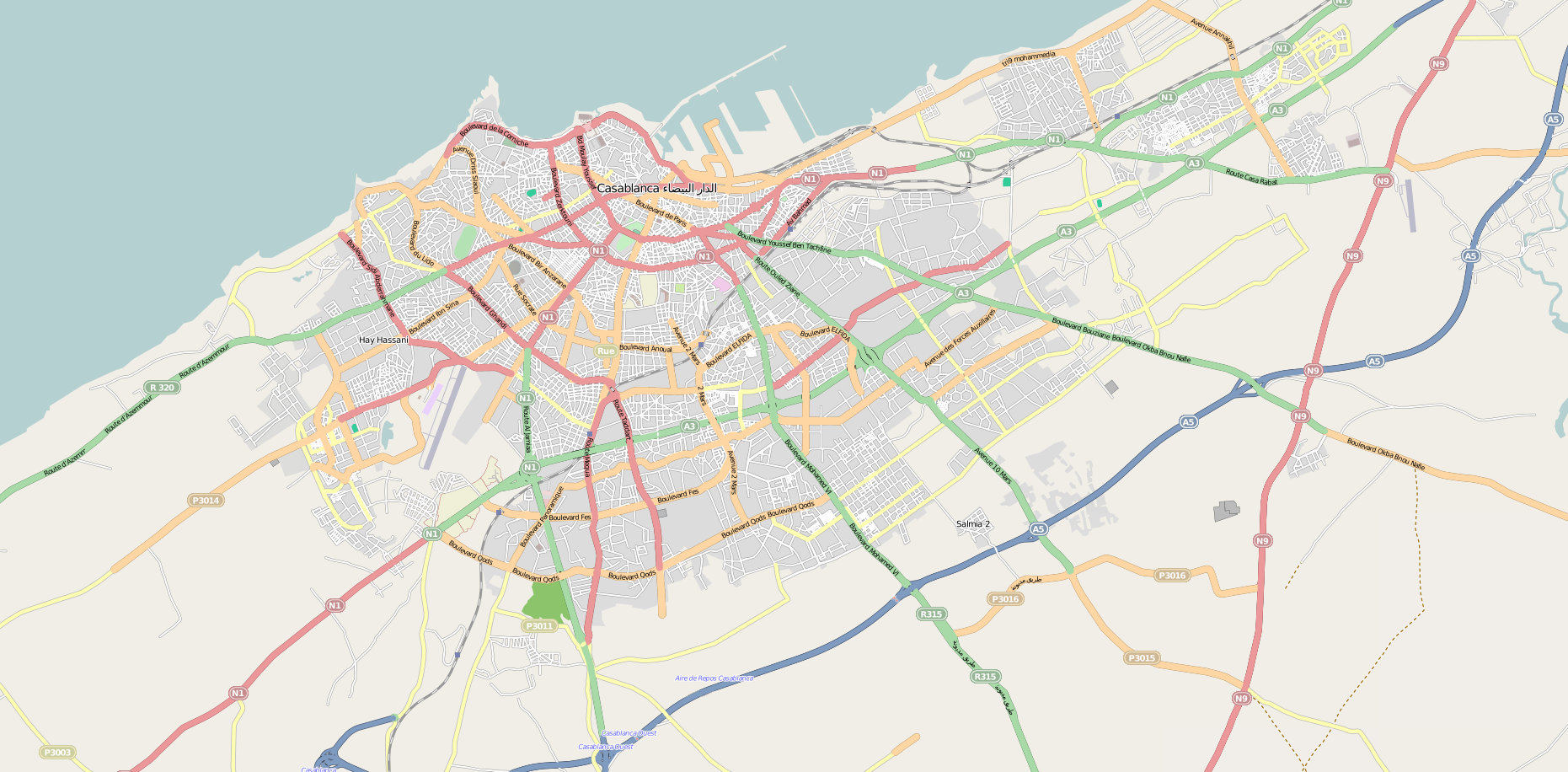
- Location within Casablanca

Religion
- Affiliation: Islam
- Region: Greater Casablanca
- Ecclesiastical or organisational status: In use
- Leadership: King Hassan II
- Year consecrated: 1993
- Status: Active

Location
- Location: Morocco
- Municipality: Casablanca
- Coordinates: 33.6085°N 7.6327°W

Architecture
- Architect: Michel Pinseau
- Type: Mosque
- Style: Moroccan, Andalusian, Moorish
- General contractor: Bouygues
- Groundbreaking: 12 July 1986
- Completed: 30 August 1993
- Construction cost: $400–$700 million

Specifications
- Capacity: 105,000 (25,000 indoors, additional 80,000 on Mosque's grounds)
- Dome: One
- Minaret: One
- Minaret height: 210 metres (690 ft)
- Materials: Cedar from Middle Atlas; Marble from Agadir; Granite from Tafraoute

The Hassan II Mosque (Arabic: مسجد الحسن الثاني) is a mosque in Casablanca, Morocco. It is the second largest mosque in Africa and one of the largest mosques in the world. Its minaret is the world's second tallest minaret at 210 metres (689 ft). Completed in 1993, it was designed by Michel Pinseau under the guidance of King Hassan II and built by Moroccan artisans from all over the kingdom. The minaret is 60 stories high, topped by a laser, the light from which is directed towards Mecca. The mosque stands on a promontory looking out to the Atlantic Ocean; worshippers can pray over the sea but there is no glass floor looking into the sea. The walls are made of handcrafted marble, and the roof is retractable. A maximum of 105,000 worshippers can gather together for prayer: 25,000 inside the mosque hall and another 80,000 on the mosque's outside ground.

The official website of the Hassan II Mosque Foundation states that: "3,300 Moroccan craftsmen of national and international renown contributed to this precious jewel. 854 qualified maâlems out of 1,530 in the field of carpentry, 80 qualified maâlems out of a total of 1,600 assigned to plasterwork, and 100 qualified maâlems out of 170 specializing in zellige."

== Geography ==
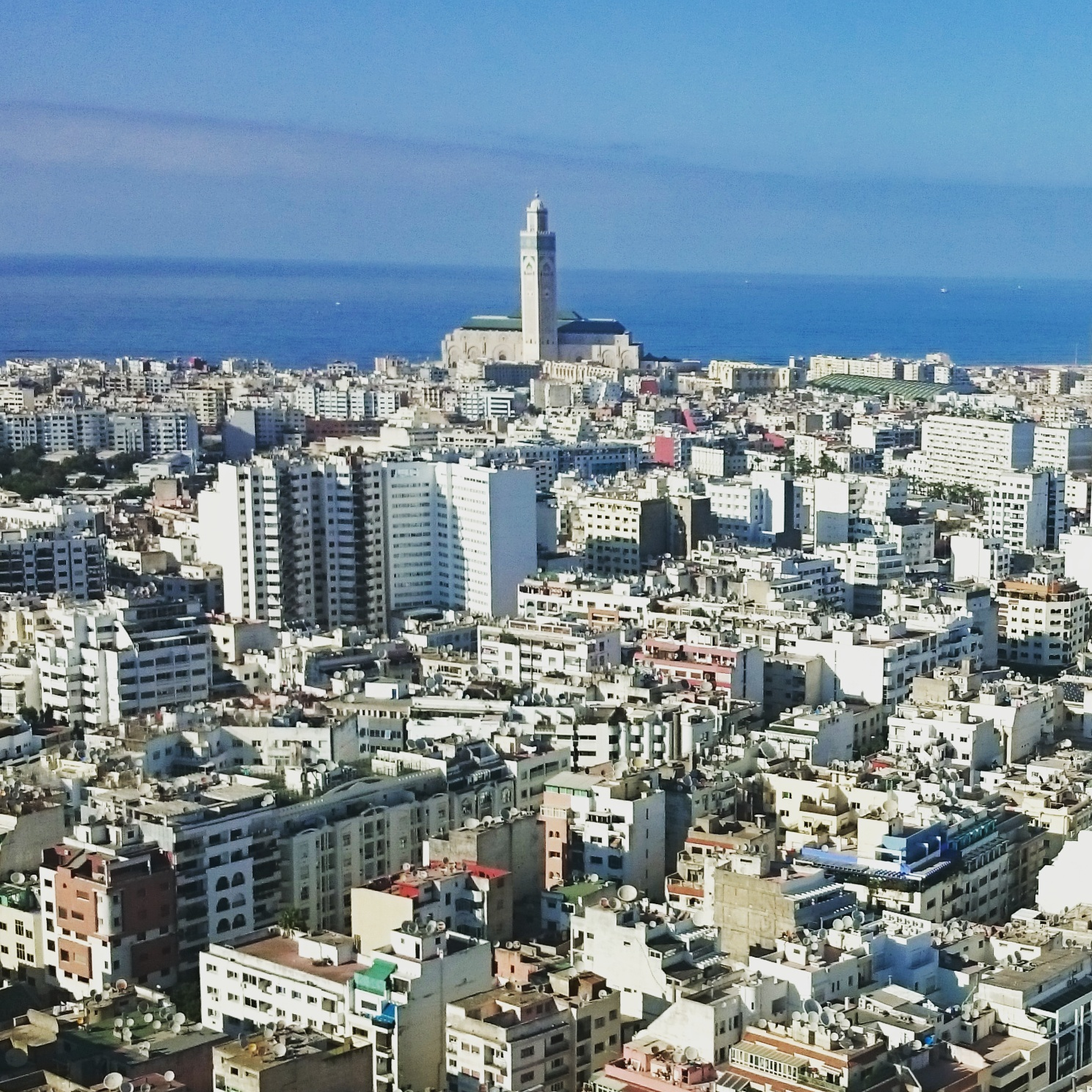
View of the mosque from the south, overlooking central Casablanca

The mosque is located at Bd. Sidi Mohammed Ben Abdallah in Casablanca. The 9 hectares (22 acres) complex nestles between the harbor and the El Hank Lighthouse.

From the nearest train station at Casa-Port, it is about a 20-minute walk to the mosque. The ten-lane boulevard with shopping avenues is at the southern facade of the mosque and extends to the gates of the Palace Oued el Makhazine in the middle of the city. The basilical plan of the mosque justifies this layout of the boulevard.

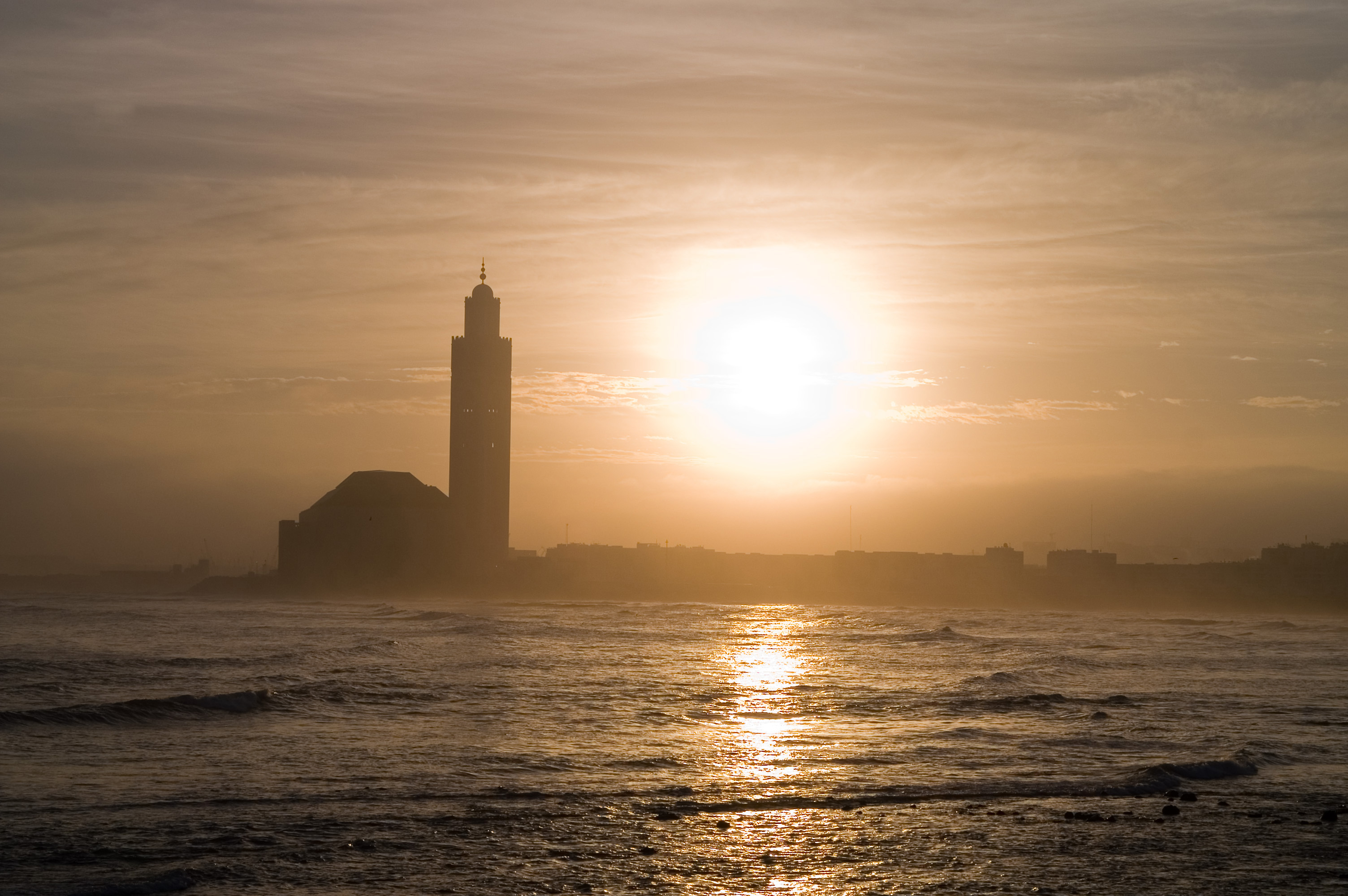
View from a beach to the west, at sunrise

The mosque rises above the Atlantic Ocean. The building is built partially on land and partially over the ocean. This siting was accomplished by creating a platform linking a natural rock outcrop reclaimed from the sea, where the Orthlieb Pool had previously been located. Two large breakwaters were also built to protect the mosque from the erosive action of ocean waves, which can reach heights of up to 10 metres (33 ft). A temporary pier 800 metres (2,600 ft) in length had to be erected to protect the foundations of the pillars from the sea during the construction period. Its environmental advantage is that it is free of noise and pollution and receives a fresh breeze from the sea.

Apart from the mosque, other structures in the area are a madrasa (Islamic school), hammams (bathhouses), a museum on Moroccan history, conference halls, and a very large library said to be the "most comprehensive in the Islamic world." The 41 fountains in the courtyard are all well decorated. The garden around the mosque is well-tended and is a popular location for family picnics. The traditionally designed madrasa occupies an area of 4,840 square metres (52,100 ft^{2}) including the basement. Two stories in height, it is constructed in a semi-circular shape, with an abutting qibla wall and the mihrab section.

== History ==
The historical context of the mosque began with the death of King Mohammed V in 1961. King Hassan II had requested for the best of the country's artisans to come forward and submit plans for a mausoleum to honour the departed king; it should "reflect the fervor and veneration with which this illustrious man was regarded." However, the Mausoleum of Mohammed V was eventually sited in Rabat rather than Casablanca.

In 1980, during his birthday celebrations, Hassan II made his ambitions clear for creating a landmark monument in Casablanca:

I wish Casablanca to be endowed with a large, fine building of which it can be proud until the end of time ... I want to build this mosque on the water, because God's throne is on the water. Therefore, the faithful who go there to pray, to praise the creator on firm soil, can contemplate God's sky and ocean.

The building was commissioned by King Hassan II to be the most ambitious structure ever built in Morocco. It was designed by the French architect Michel Pinseau, who had lived in Morocco, and was constructed by the civil engineering group Bouygues.

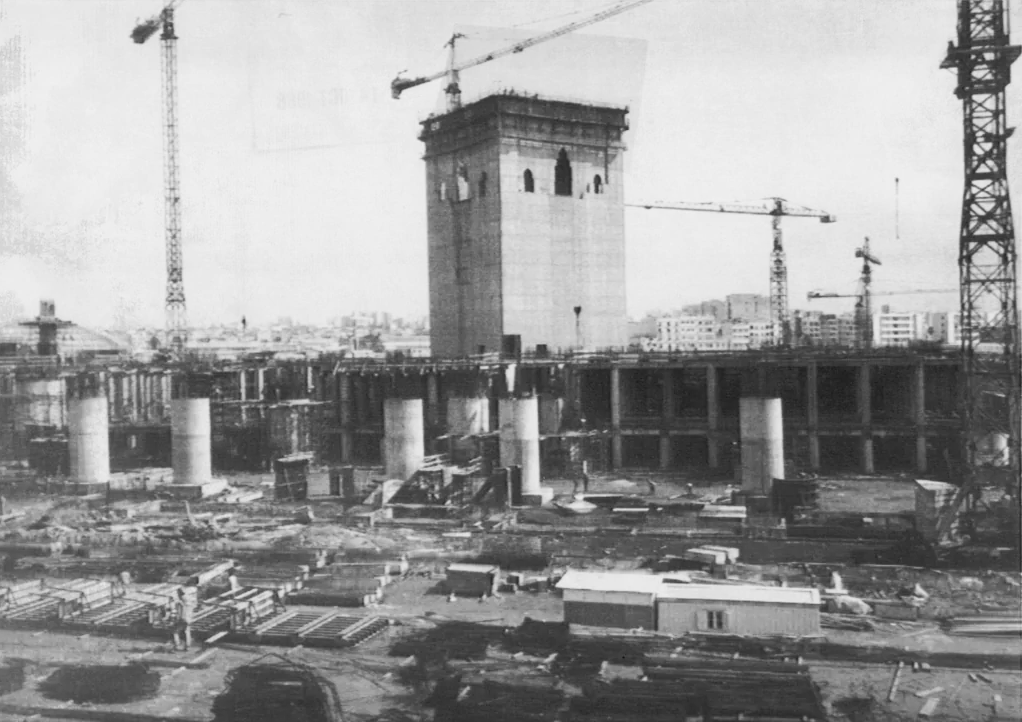
Construction in 1988

Work commenced on July 12, 1986, and was conducted over a seven-year period. Construction was scheduled to be completed in 1989, ready for Hassan II's 60th birthday. During the most intense period of construction, 1400 men worked during the day and another 1100 during the night. 10,000 artists and craftsmen participated in building and beautifying the mosque. However, the building was not completed on schedule, which delayed the inauguration. The formal inauguration was subsequently chosen to be the 11th Rabi' al-Awwal of the year 1414 of the Hijra, corresponding to 30 August 1993, which also marked the eve of the anniversary of Prophet Muhammad's birth. It was dedicated to the Sovereign of Morocco.

=== Financing ===
Construction costs, estimated to be about 585 million euros, were an issue of debate in Morocco, a lower-middle-income country. While Hassan wished to build a mosque which would be second in size only to the mosque at Mecca, the government lacked funds for such a grand project. Much of the financing was by public subscription. Twelve million people donated to the cause, with a receipt and certificate given to every donor. The smallest contribution was 5 DH. In addition to public donations and those from business establishments as well as other countries, Western countries provided construction loans, which Morocco repaid.

== Architecture and fittings ==
In the words of the authors of the book Morocco Country Study Guide, the Hassan II Mosque "undeniably marks the continuity of a modernized ancestral art and bears the sign of innovations that are due not only to technical reasons but also to a fertile exploration of new aesthetic possibilities."

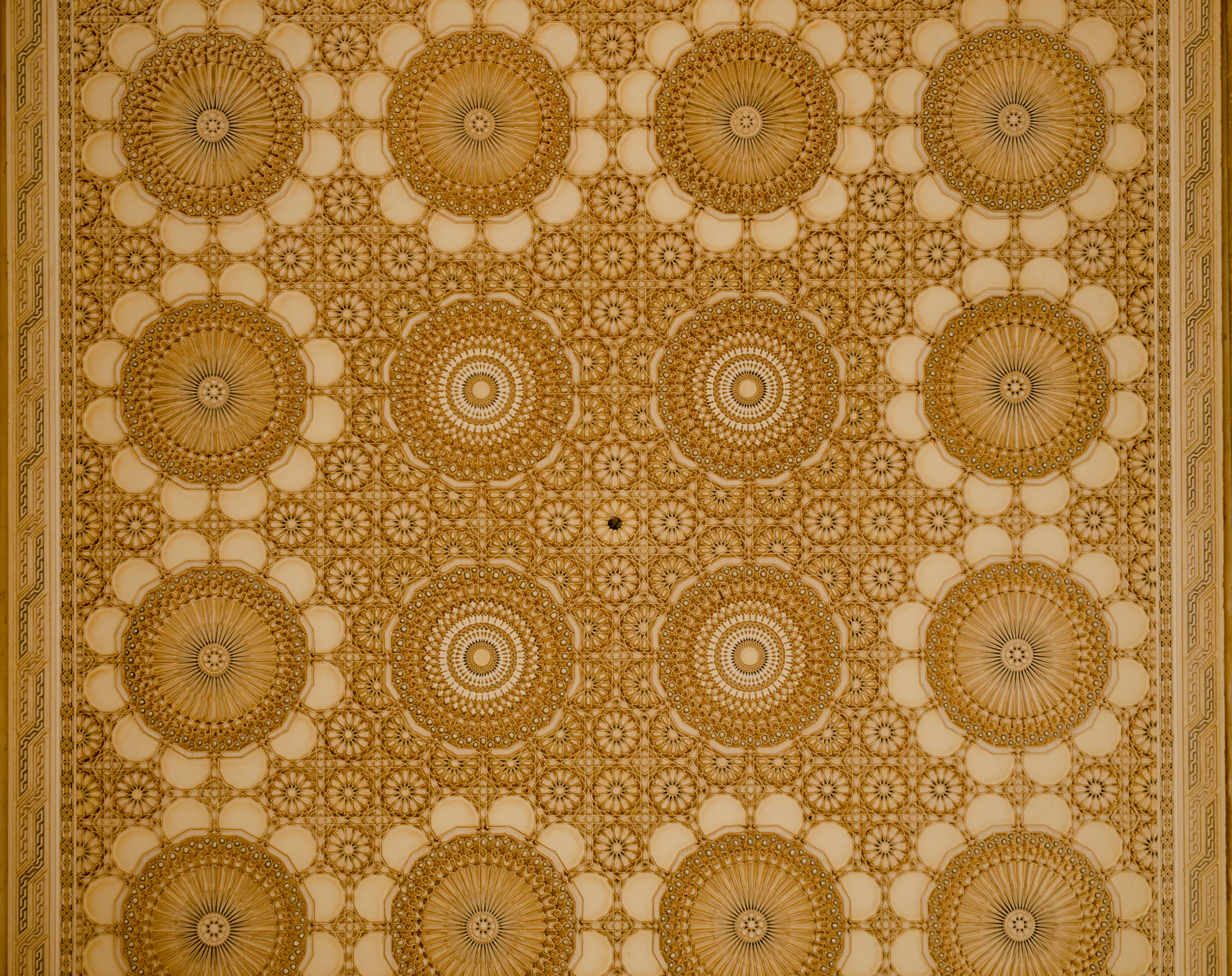
Ceiling woodwork

The building dimensions are 200 metres (660 ft) in length and 100 metres (330 ft) in width.

All of the granite, plaster, marble, wood and other materials used in the construction, were extracted from around Morocco, with the exception of some Italian white granite columns and 56 glass chandeliers. Six thousand traditional Moroccan artisans worked for five years to create the abundant and beautiful Islamic geometric patterns, stone and marble floors and columns, sculpted plaster moldings, and carved and painted wood ceilings.

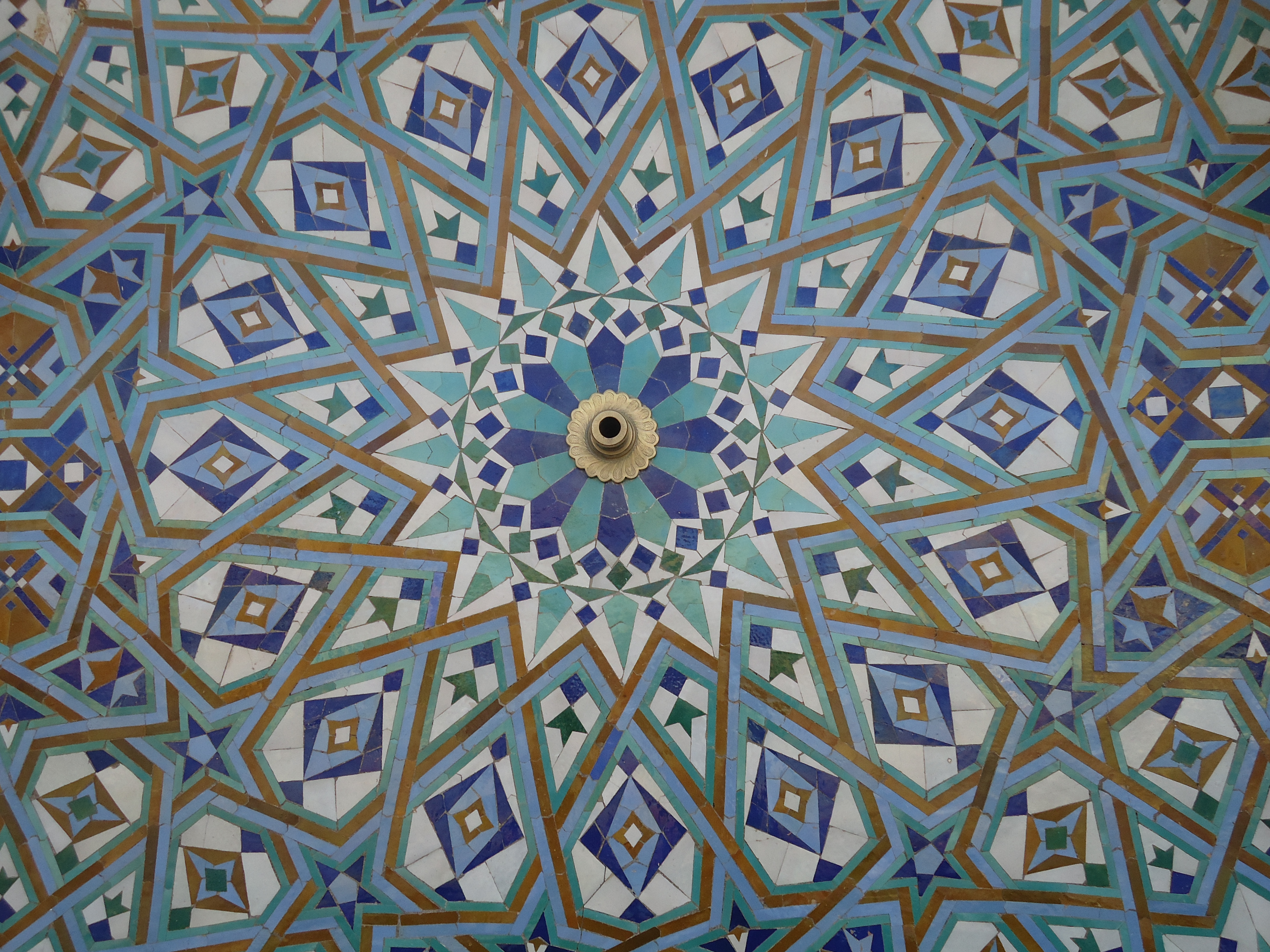
Zellij fountain

The exterior surfaces of the mosque display titanium, bronze, and granite finishes. It is ornamented with pale blue marble and zellij (mosaic) tilework. A particular feature in the mosque is that all structures are made of reinforced cement concrete and all decorations are of traditional Moroccan design. The construction work involved the engagement of 35,000 workers and working of over 50 million hours. The mosque has the capacity to accommodate 25,000 devotees for prayers in the main hall and another 80,000 in the plaza squares around it.

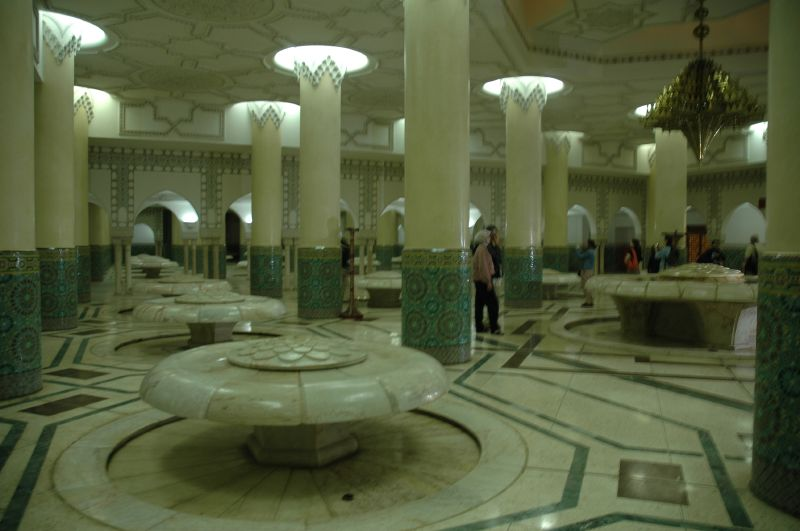
Ablution hall

Notable architectural features include the conspicuous columns, the horseshoe arches, and the innumerable muqarnas embellishing the ceilings. The dome, arches, and walls give a grand ambiance to the mosque. The first-class sound system is discreetly hidden. The ablution room and a vast public hammam are in the basement, with its own entrance. Tadelakt, a plastering technique which adds egg yolks and black soap into mixed plaster, was used in the hammam baths.

=== Design ===
Main entrance door

The building blends Islamic architecture and Moroccan elements, and reflects Moorish influences, while featuring an urban design. It displays elements found in other Moroccan buildings, such as the unfinished mosque in Rabat and the Koutoubia Mosque in Marrakesh.

It has a basilical layout, which differs from the traditional T-shaped plan common in North African mosques. The qibla wall is perpendicular to the naves, which is unconventional, as it is customary for the rows of worshipers facing Mecca to be as wide as possible rather than extend farther back (Halod and Khan 1997, 61).

The adoption of this plan has been described as "a conflict between King Hassan II, the ancient aristocrat, and King Hassan II, the contemporary leader who must develop commerce and industry in order meet the needs of his country."

=== Prayer hall ===
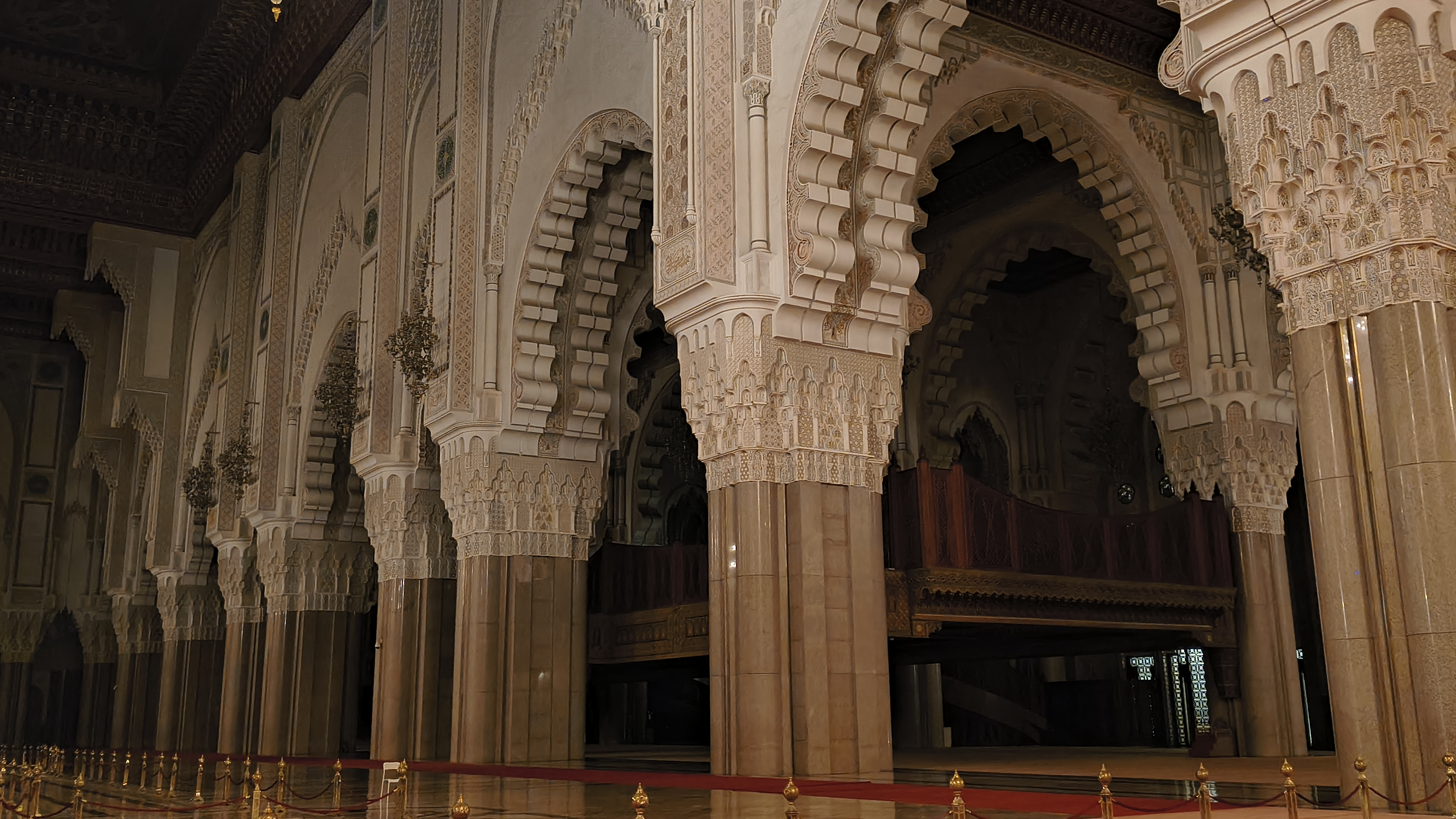
Inside

Inside

The prayer hall is on the top of the mosque, covered in windows. The central hall is centrally heated and provides spectacular underwater views of the Atlantic Ocean. The decorations in the hall are elaborate and exquisite, made possible by involving 6,000 master artisans of Morocco working on it.

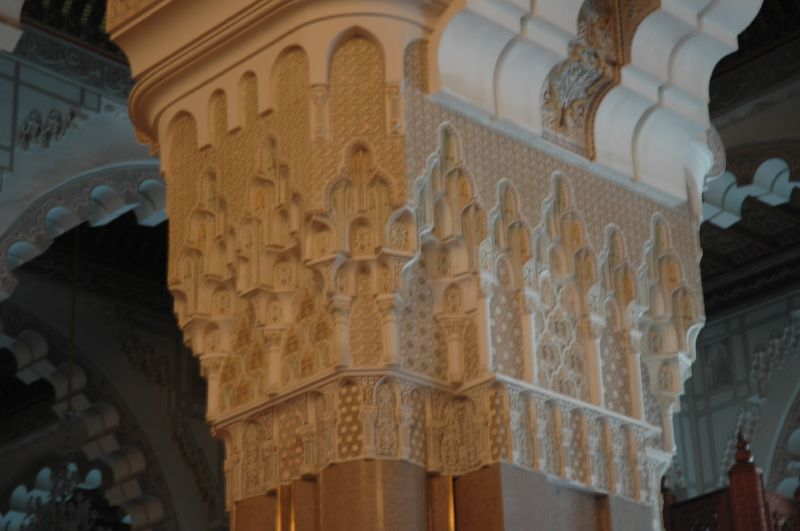
Moorish stucco work

The woodcarvings, the zellij work and the stucco mouldings are of elaborate and highly impressive design; the wood used for carving is cedar from the middle Atlas Mountains, the marble is from Agadir and granite is brought from Tafraoute.

The prayer hall is built to a rectangular plan of 200 metres (660 ft) length and 100 metres (330 ft) width with three naves, which are perpendicular to the qibla wall. The central nave of the hall is 40 metres (130 ft) and larger than the side naves, which are 27 metres (89 ft) high. The central hall is undulating with a succession of numerous domes from which glass chandeliers, imported from Murano, are hung.

Corridor

On either side of the hall, there are mezzanine floors with carved dark wood furnishings, which are reserved for women. The doors are electrically operated. A triptych marble partition with open work and a central window flanked by two smaller sized windows is built on the wall of the façade. Such panels, built with multicolored arches, engraved with ornamented floral designs, appear like a geometrical framework when viewed from the outside. The gates are embellished with marble bars which have faux voussoirs (alternately smooth or sculpted).

The pillars of 13 metres (43 ft) height are square in shape with engaged columns and cruciform joining a series of pillars. Geometrically shaped multi-colored zellji with carved plaster are noted with floral and geometric designs with epigraphy. Carved or painted marble or shaped wood are used for these elegant designs, which highlight Islamic art forms.

The roof is retractable, illuminating the hall with daytime sunlight and allowing worshippers to pray under the stars on clear nights. It weighs 1,100 tons and can be opened in five minutes; it measures 60 metres (200 ft) high, with an area of 3,400 square metres (37,000 ft^{2}). The roof is covered with cast-aluminium tiles, (similar to the Fez tiles), stronger and more reliable than traditional ceramic tiles, and about 35 percent lighter. The prayer hall is also illuminated by light from the glass gates on the northern wall.

=== Minaret ===
Hassan II Mosque minaret

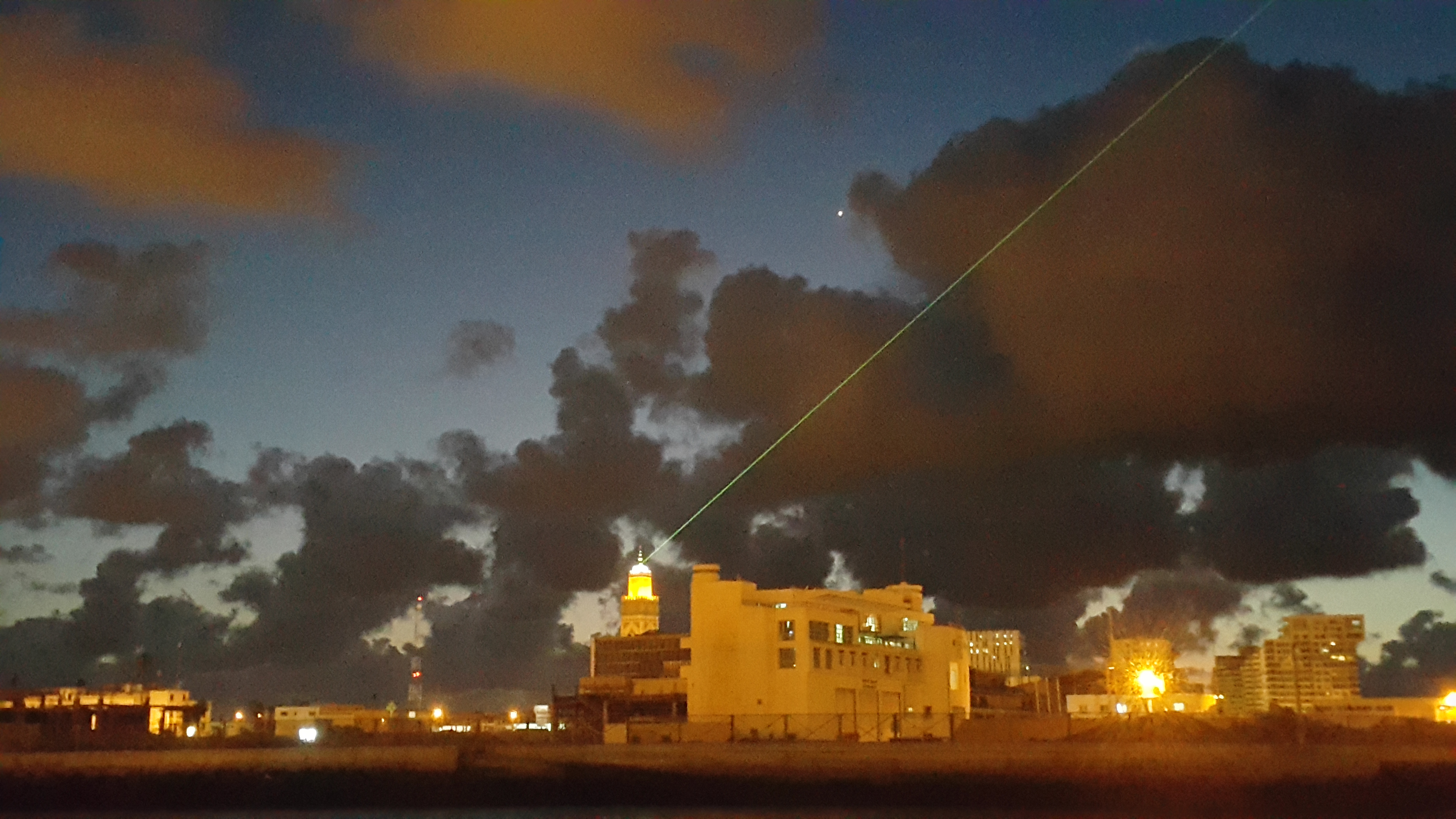
Laser beam projecting a visible green line towards Mecca at night

The minaret is 210 metres (690 ft) tall and was the tallest minaret in the world when completed in 1993. It has a laser beam fitted at the top, which is electronically operated in the evening. It is oriented towards Mecca and has a range of 30 kilometres (19 mi). The minaret is said to enhance the visual alignment of the boulevard.

It is square in shape, thrusting skyward. The base-to-top width ratio of 1 to 8 (between the basement and the summit) has a marble covering on the exterior with austere decoration. The faces of the facade have carved ornamentation with different materials. There are stitches of roudani tracetine on a 100,000 MP surface. This decorative material (with chrome and green as dominant colours) is a substitute for the use of bricks, the material used in many other notable minarets, and has given the mosque an extraordinary elegance.

Close-up view of the minaret

Green tiles decorate the minaret for one third of the height from the top, and then change colour to deep green or turquoise blue; it is said that in the Hassan II minaret, the designer had used his sea-foam green and blue to celebrate the life of a king.

The concrete used for the minaret was a special high-grade type, which could perform well under severe conditions of a combined action of strong wind and seismicity. This was achieved by the Science Department of the Bouygues Group, the contractors for the project, who developed an extra-strength concrete four times stronger than ordinary concrete. Called B.H.P (highly resistant concrete), it offers a resistance to compression value of 1200 bars per sqcm (claimed to be a world record) and has a very quick setting time. This enabled the building of a taller structure with due underpinning of the foundation, while adhering to the construction schedule. Cranes were also designed to suit the height of the minaret for concreting.

=== Hassan II Mosque Museum ===
The museum opened its doors to the public after the construction of the mosque. It showcases art pieces from various traditional Moroccan arts as well as unused architectural elements of the mosque, such as carved stucco, painted wood ceilings, and zellij walls.

== Restoration works ==
Structural deterioration in the concrete wall was observed ten years after the mosque's completion. This was explained as being due to exposure to the salt water of the Atlantic Ocean, into which nearly half of the mosque's foundation projects. Salt water migrating into the porous concrete caused the rusting of the rebar steel reinforcements, resulting in expansion of the steel and causing cracking of the concrete. Salt water had penetrated beyond the steel bar into the structures as well.

Effective restoration works were instituted in April 2005. This involved use of moly-grade stainless steel combined with high-grade concrete to make the structure resistant to chloride attack, a process that evolved during 3 years of research. This is expected to enhance the building's life by 100 years.

The works were carried out in four phases:

- In the first phase, a leak-proof coffer dam was constructed to isolate and dry the work area. This was built 5 metres (16 ft) below the highest water level.
- In the second phase, the voids seen in the prayer hall were filled with concrete.
- In the third phase, the structural slabs and pillars on the exterior part of the mosque exposed to the sea were demolished; 6,000 cubic metres (210,000 ft^{3}) of concrete was removed.
- In the fourth phase, new exterior protection works were built using high-strength concrete with 2205 (conforming to UNS S 32205 EN 1.442 standards) stainless steel rods as reinforcements for effective erosion control.

Even though many structural changes were made as per detailed design, still, during the execution of works, 100 external pillars, called “combs” because of their wave-breaking characteristics, were exposed to salt water and wave action and had to be replaced with new pillars. These were made from high-strength concrete with 2205 stainless steel reinforcements. This necessitated an additional leak-proof dyke to be built behind the earlier one; total dyke quantity involved was 20,000 cubic metres (710,000 ft^{3}).

All of these works involved the use of 1300 tons of special steel (with 40 tons of Mo) of 8–20 millimetres (0.31–0.79 in) bars with a yield strength of 850 N per mm2. The concrete quantity poured involved 100,000 cubic metres (3,500,000 ft^{3}) of non-reinforced bulk concrete and 10,000 cubic metres (350,000 ft^{3}) of high-strength concrete. The entire work was done at a cost of 50 million euros.

== See also ==
- Lists of mosques
- List of mosques in Africa
- List of mosques in Morocco
- Islamic art
- Timeline of Muslim history
- List of tallest minarets
- List of tallest mosques

== Bibliography ==
- Elleh, Nnamdi (2002). Architecture and Power in Africa. Heritage Greenwood Publishing Group. ISBN 9780275976798.
- Morocco Country Study Guide. USA International Business Publications. 2006. ISBN 9780739715147.
