= Hjorthagen =

Coordinates: 59°21′17″N 18°05′40″E

- District
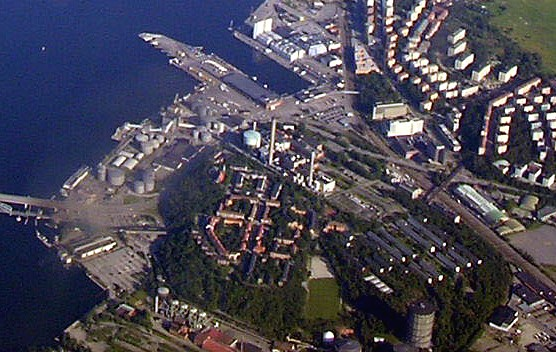
- Hjorthagen and surroundings (2004)
- Interactive map of Hjorthagen
- Country: Sweden
- Municipality: Stockholm
- Municipal area: City Centre
- Borough: Östermalm

Hjorthagen is a district in the northeastern part of central Stockholm, located near Ropsten and Lidingöbron. Since 1997, Hjorthagen has been part of Östermalm district.

== District ==
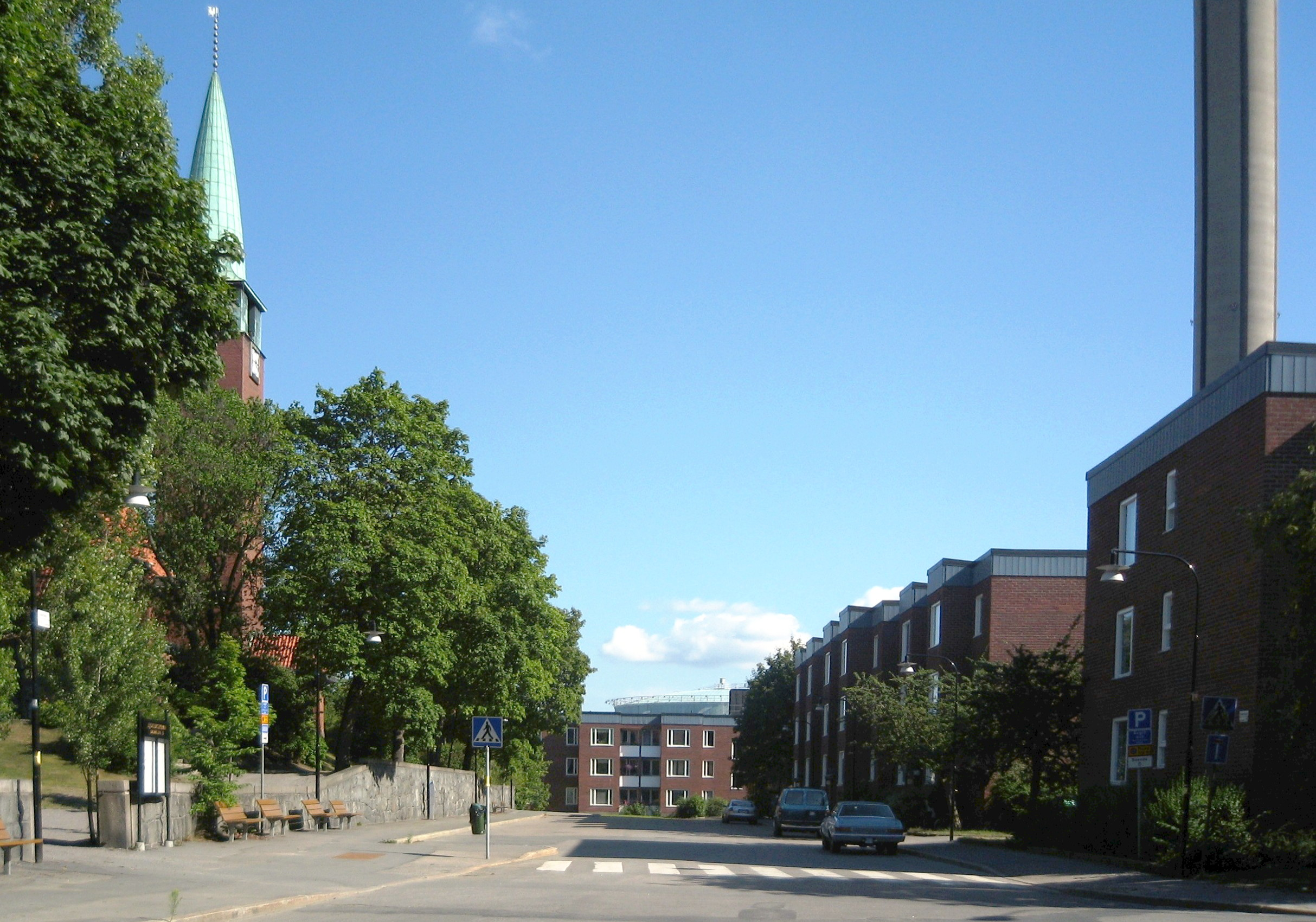
Hjorthagen Church on the left and Värtaverket's chimney on the right.

Hjorthagen belongs to Östermalm district, it had around 8,000 inhabitants in 2017. The district borders Ladugårdsgärdet and Norra Djurgården. Due to new investment on infrastructures, the district of Hjorthagen is estimated to have over 17,000 inhabitants by year 2027.
