= Ducor Hotel =

Abandoned hotel in Monrovia, Liberia

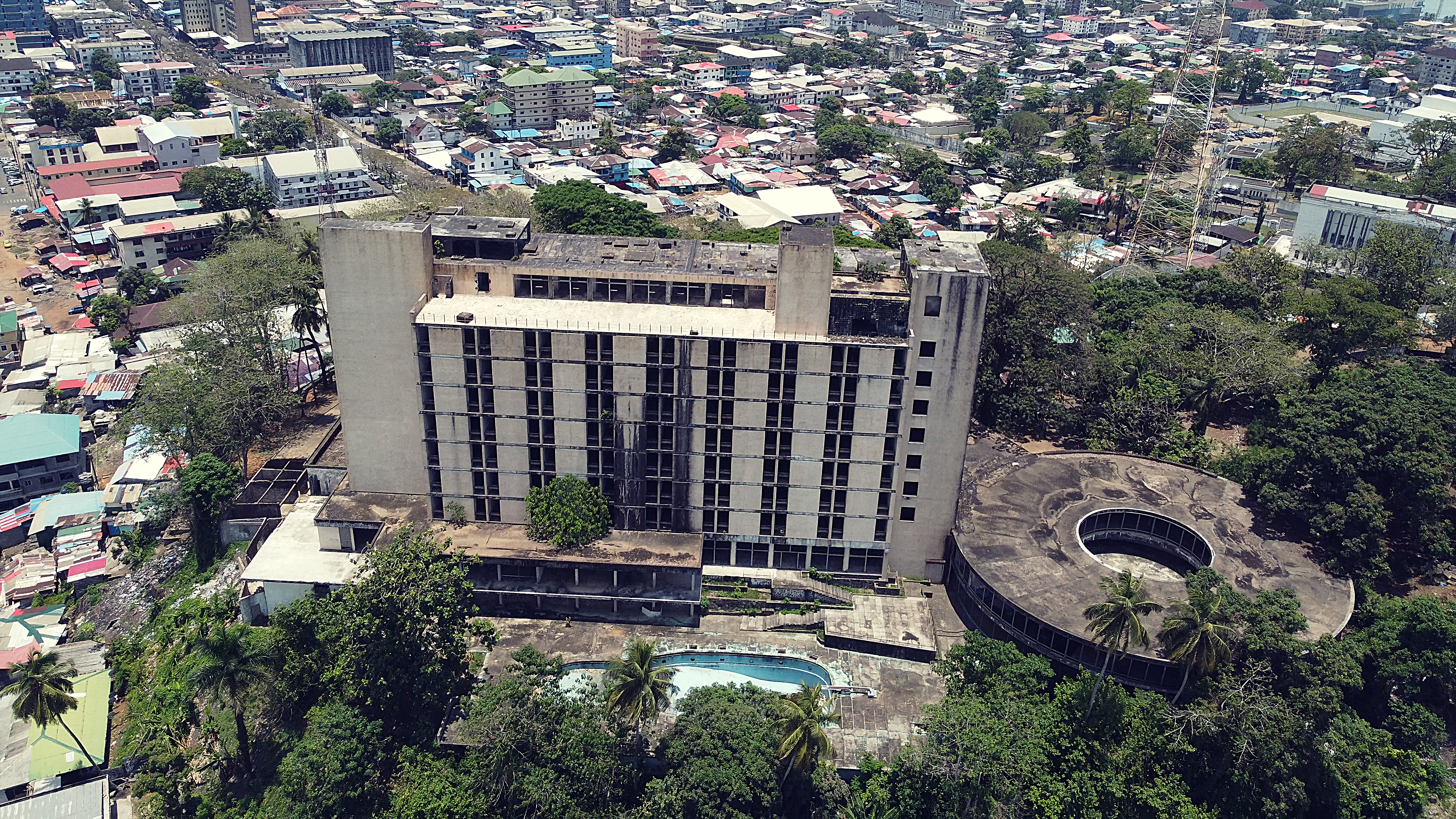
- Interactive map of the Ducor Hotel area
- Former names: Ducor Palace, Ducor Intercontinental Hotel

General information
- Type: Hotel
- Location: Liberia, Broad Street, Monrovia
- Coordinates: 6°19′13″N 10°48′49″W
- Elevation: 7 m (23 ft)
- Current tenants: None (formerly numerous squatters)
- Inaugurated: 1960
- Owner: formerly Intercontinental Hotels

The Ducor Hotel is an abandoned luxury hotel in Monrovia, Liberia. Established in 1960, it had 106 rooms on eight stories. The hotel has fallen into disrepair after being occupied by squatters, later removed during a failed effort at a Libyan-funded renovation. The building sits on Ducor Hill, the highest point of the city, overlooking the Atlantic Ocean, the Saint Paul River and Monrovia's West Point district. It is located at the end of Broad Street across from United Nations Boulevard in Monrovia's main business district.

== History ==
The 120-room Ducor Palace Hotel opened in 1960, designed and built by Israeli industrialist Moshe Mayer. It was the first international-class hotel in Liberia, and was for many years one of the few five-star hotels in all of Africa. The inauguration ceremony was an international affair, attended by President Sekou Toure of Guinea, and Israeli Foreign Minister Golda Meir, among others. Intercontinental Hotels assumed operation on April 1, 1962 and it was renamed the Ducor Intercontinental. An extension to the hotel, with 110 more rooms and expanded meeting facilities, was completed in 1963.

The Ducor Intercontinental hosted important meetings between African leaders. Idi Amin is said to have swum in its pool while carrying his gun. President Houphouet-Boigny of the Ivory Coast was so impressed with the hotel during his stay that he commissioned Mayer to erect a similar luxury hotel in Abidjan, the Hotel Ivoire. The Ducor's various amenities, such as its pool, tennis courts, and a French restaurant, made it popular with tourists from the Côte d'Ivoire and Ghana, as well as visiting professionals from the US, Europe, and Asia.

Inter-Continental Hotels ceased managing the hotel in 1987. With political uncertainty looming, the Ducor Hotel closed in 1989, just before the coup led by Charles Taylor which ousted President Samuel Doe and marked the beginning of the First Liberian Civil War. The building endured much damage during this period, due both to the violence of the war and to postwar looting. During this time, displaced residents of many of Monrovia's slums began to occupy the hotel's empty rooms.

In 2007, the Ministry of Justice evicted the squatters residing in the hotel. In 2008, the Government of Liberia signed a lease agreement with the Government of Libya, who began clearing the property of debris in 2010 in preparation for a bidding process to be completed by June 2010. The Italian design firm Serapioni prepared models of the renovated hotel. The project was delayed several times, before finally being abandoned upon Liberia's severing of diplomatic relations with the Gaddafi government following the outbreak of the 2011 Libyan civil war.

== Gallery ==
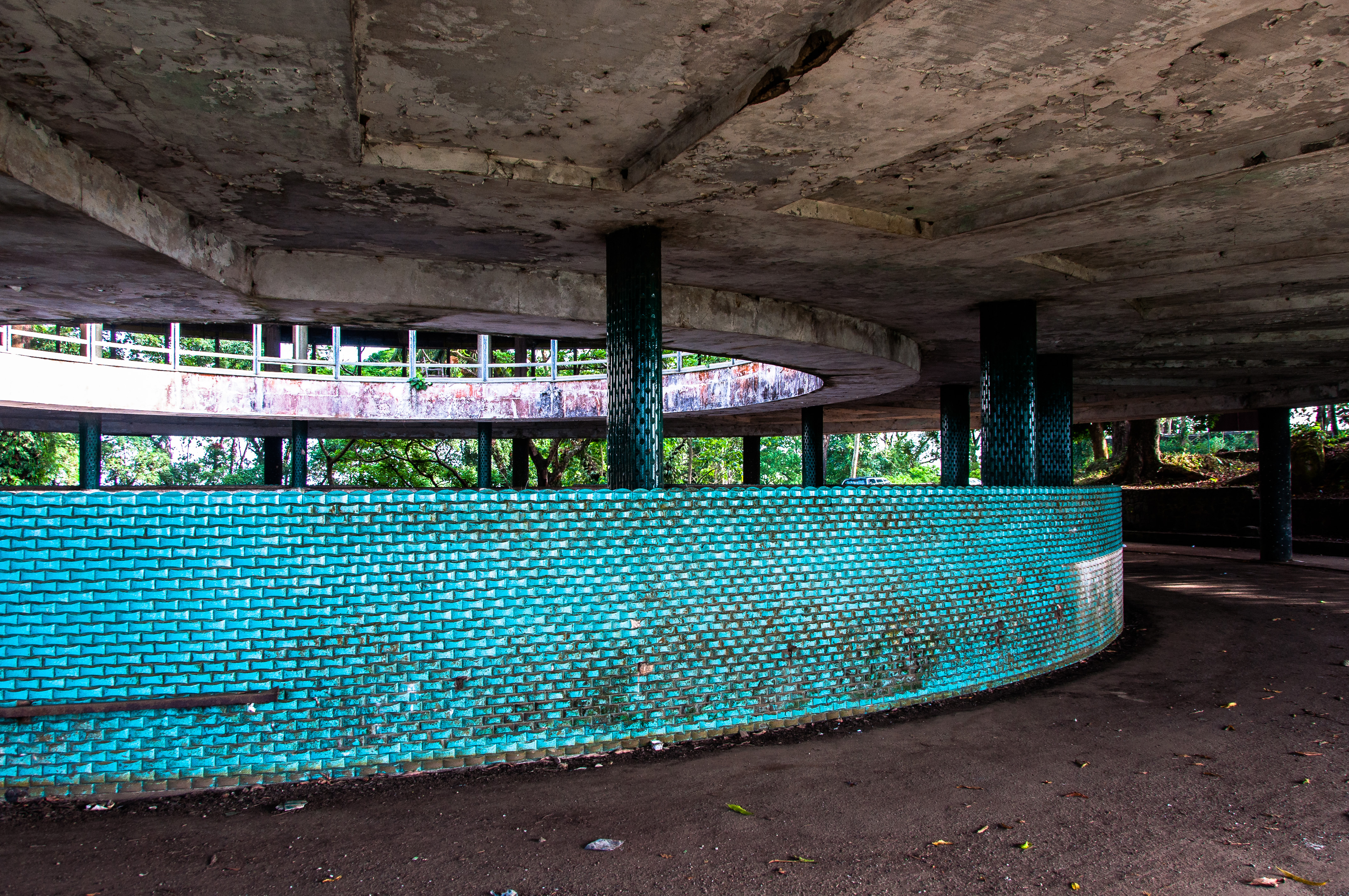
Driveway

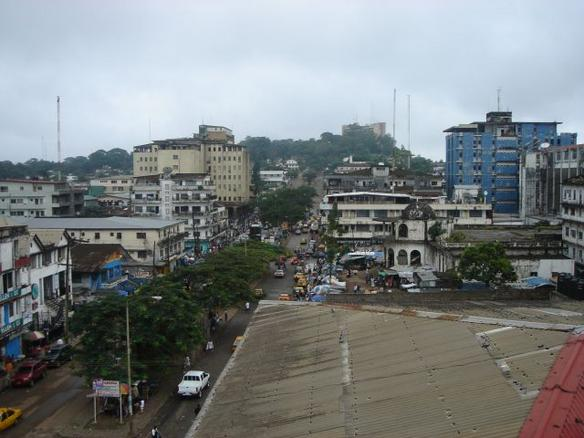
Broad street in Monrovia. The Ducor Hotel is visible on the hilltop in the background.

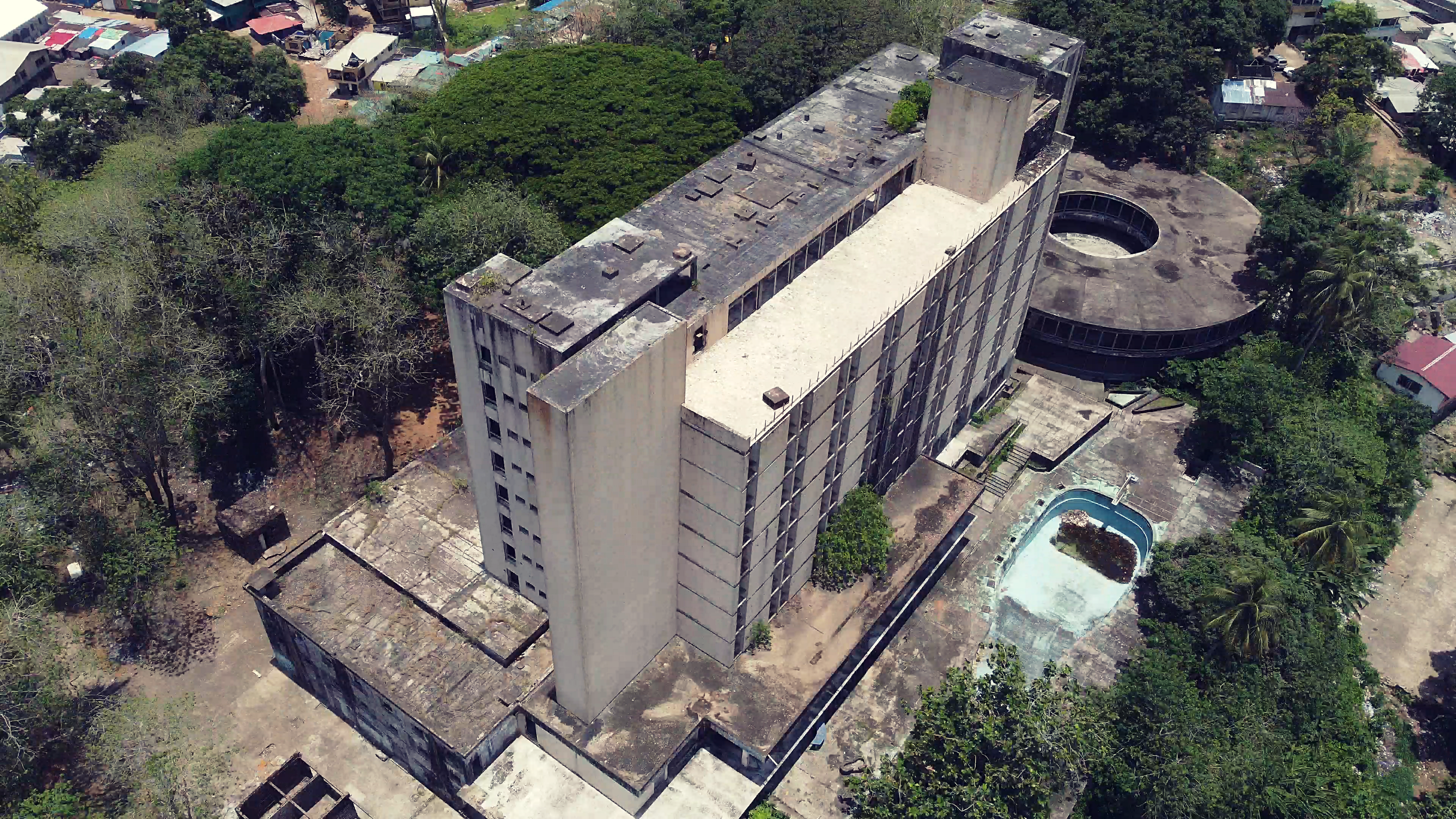
Aerial view of the hotel in 2025.

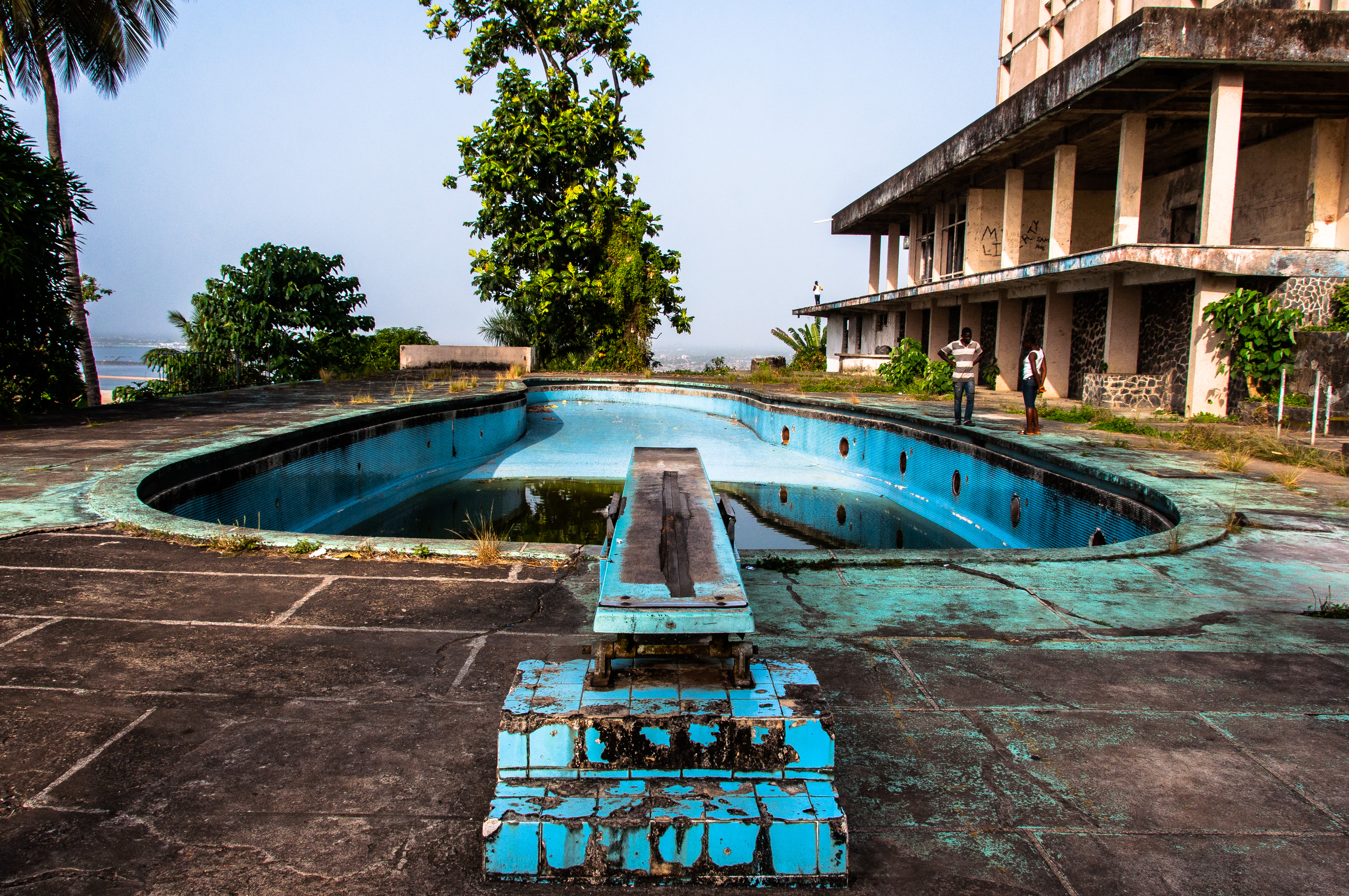
Former pool area
