= InterContinental =

Brand of luxury hotels

InterContinental Hotels & Resorts
- Type: Subsidiary
- Industry: Hotels
- Founded: 4 April 1946; 80 years ago
- Founder: Juan Trippe
- Number of locations: 208 hotels and resorts
- Owner: Pan Am Corporation (1946–1981); Grand Metropolitan (1981–1988); Saison Group (1988–1998); Bass (1998–2000); Six Continents (2000–2003); InterContinental Hotels Group (2003–present)
- Website: ihg.com/intercontinental

InterContinental Hotels & Resorts is a luxury hotel brand created in 1946 by Pan Am founder Juan Trippe. It has been part of UK-based InterContinental Hotels Group since 1998. As of January 2023, there were 208 InterContinental hotels worldwide, with 70,287 rooms.

== History ==
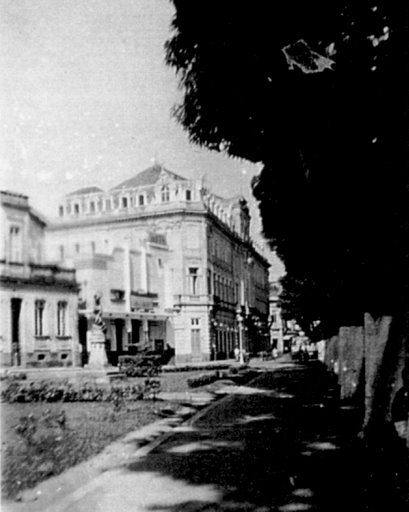
Grande Hotel, Belém, Brazil, the chain's first property, seen in 1949

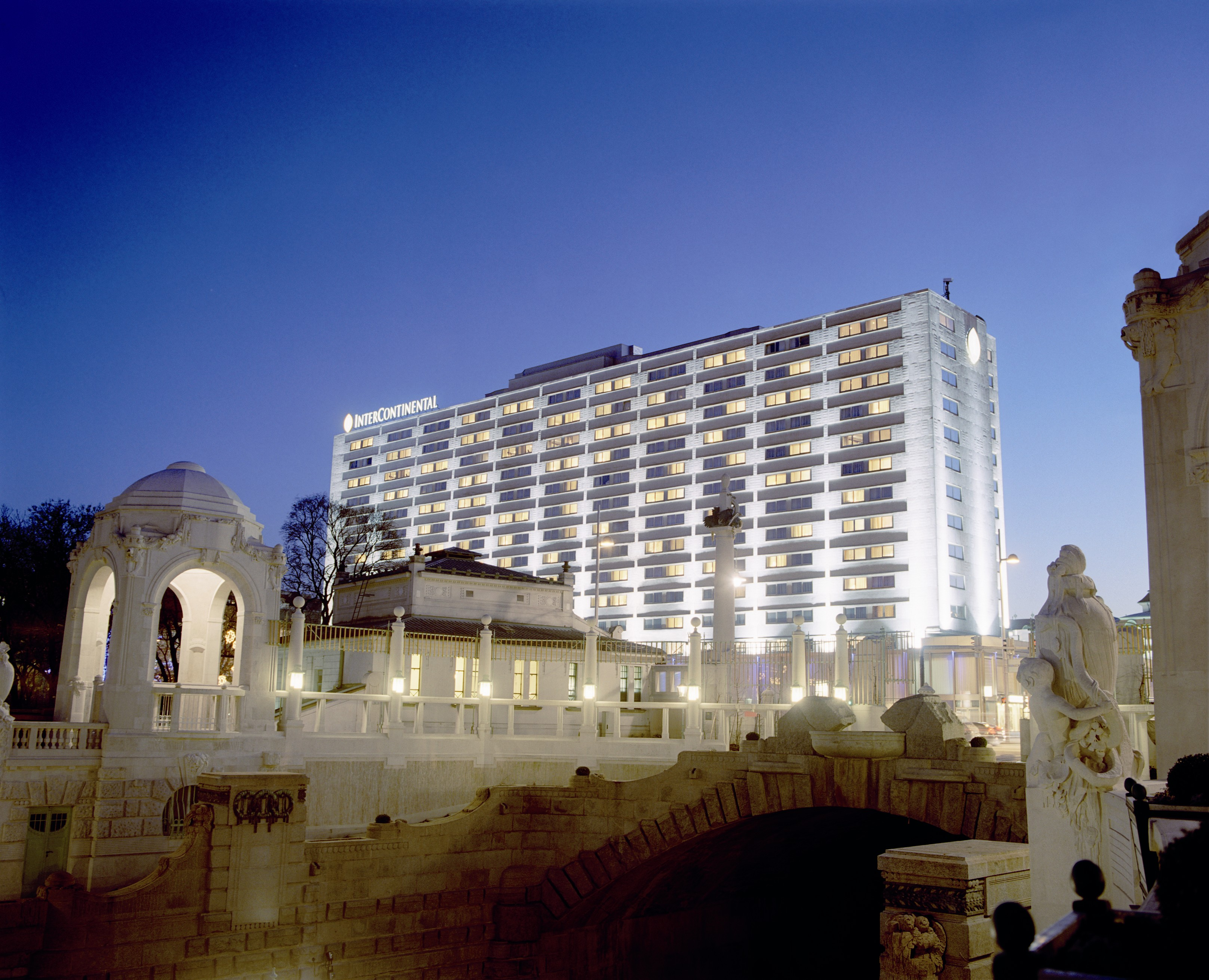
The InterContinental Vienna, the oldest continuously operating member of the chain, since 1964

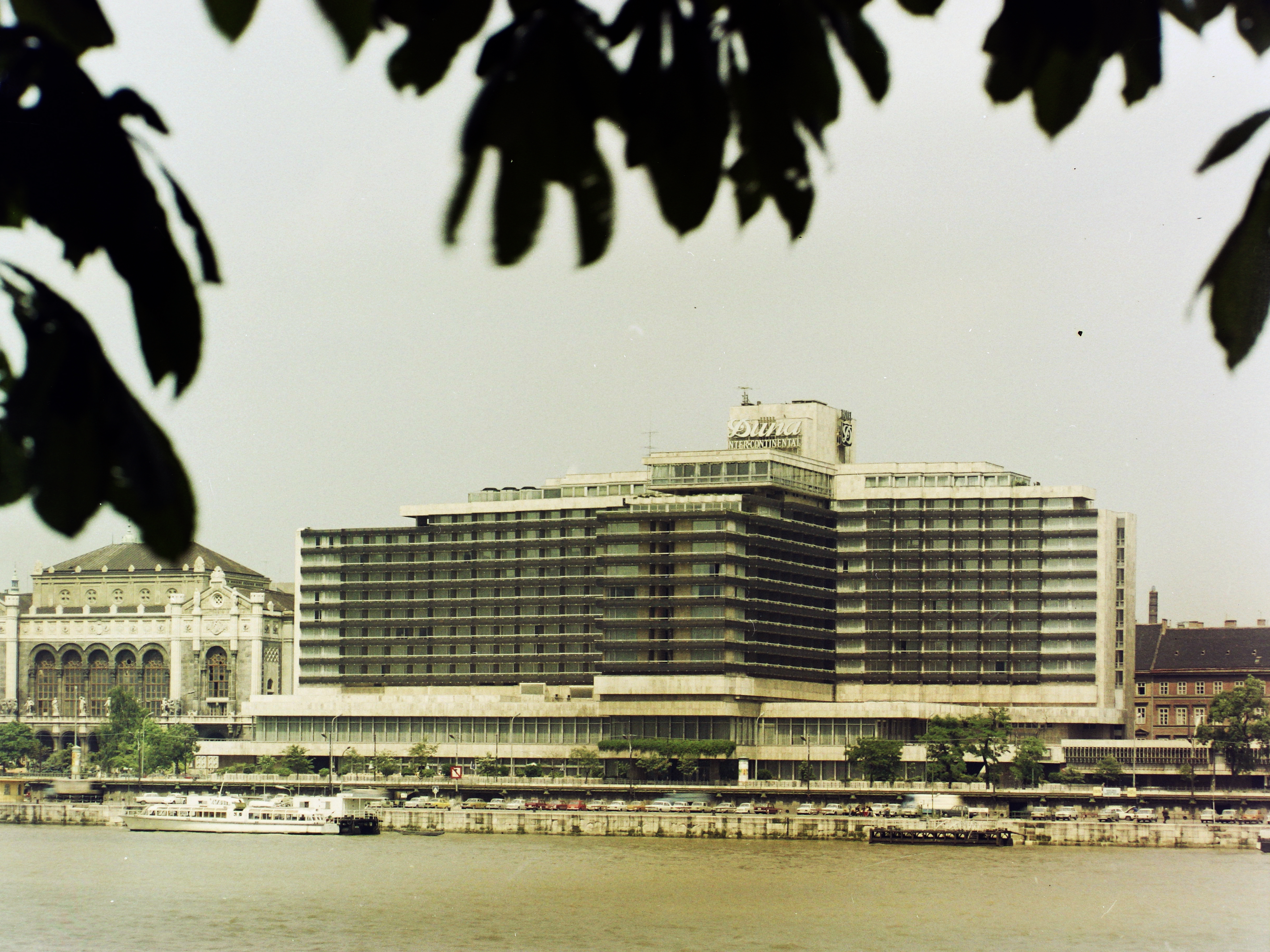
Duna Inter-Continental Budapest, seen in 1974

=== Early years ===
In 1945, U.S. President Franklin D. Roosevelt and Juan Trippe, President of Pan Am, discussed their concern for Latin America's need for development funds at a White House breakfast. The two men thought that one way to attract businessmen and tourists would be to offer luxury hotels in key cities. Trippe contacted Statler Hotels' chief executive H.B. Callis, and his company undertook a feasibility study, but the company decided the program would be too expensive. Trippe contacted multiple other US hotel chains, but none showed interest. Roosevelt requested that Pan Am take the lead in developing 5000 hotel rooms in Latin America, with a projected cost of $50,000,000. Pan Am's profit that year was only $3 million, so a $25,000,000 line of credit was arranged for Pan Am with the Export–Import Bank of the United States. Trippe agreed to form a subsidiary company to foster the implementation of the idea. The hotels would also serve to accommodate Pan Am crews and passengers in destinations where upscale hotels were not yet present.

On 4 April 1946, the International Hotels Corporation was founded, with Pan Am owning a 100% stake. Throughout 1946, company executives traveled to cities across Latin America on fact-finding trips to scout potential locations. In early 1947, Pan Am decided that Intercontinental Hotels Corporation would more accurately reflect the chain's eventual global goals for expansion, and the company was renamed. The company signed its first lease that year, for the partially-completed Hotel Victoria Plaza in Montevideo, Uruguay. Construction there would end up continuing for more than five years. Throughout 1948, more locations were scouted, and in early 1949, agreements were signed for properties in Caracas and Maracaibo, Venezuela.

On 1 May 1949, Intercontinental assumed operation of its first hotel, the 85-room Grande Hotel, in Belém, Brazil, which had been constructed in the early 20th Century. On 1 January 1950, Intercontinental assumed operation of its second hotel, the Hotel Carrera, in Santiago, Chile. Over the next three years, the company took over three more existing hotels – the Hotel del Prado in Barranquilla, Colombia; the Hotel Reforma in Mexico City and The Princess in Hamilton, Bermuda. In 1953, Intercontinental opened three newly constructed properties – the Hotel Victoria Plaza in Montevideo, the Hotel Tamanaco in Caracas and the Hotel del Lago in Maracaibo. That same year, they also opened the Hotel Tequendama in Bogotá, Colombia, the largest hotel in South America and the first hotel to be developed, designed and constructed completely under Intercontinental supervision. All four properties were designed by the Chicago firm of Holabird, Root & Burgee. In 1955, Intercontinental purchased a 47% stake in the Hotel Nacional de Cuba, in Havana. By 1958, the chain had sixteen hotels in operation throughout Latin America and the Caribbean.

=== Global expansion ===
In 1961, Intercontinental Hotels opened its first property in the Middle East, the Phoenicia Intercontinental Beirut, in Lebanon. In 1962, the chain expanded to three more continents, assuming management of the Ducor Palace Hotel in Monrovia, Liberia in April, opening the Hotel Indonesia in Jakarta, Indonesia, in July, and The Southern Cross in Melbourne, Australia, in August. The first properties in Europe followed in May 1963, with simultaneous openings in Dublin, Cork and Limerick, Ireland. In 1964, Intercontinental became the first American hotel chain to operate in Eastern Europe, when it assumed management of the Hotel Esplanade in Zagreb, Yugoslavia. The chain would continue to be unique among western hospitality companies in operating behind the "Iron Curtain", opening properties in Budapest, Bucharest, Prague and Warsaw between 1968 and 1974.

The company continued constructing new luxury hotels in Pan Am destinations around the world. In its hotel designs, Intercontinental aspired to combine Mid-century modern American luxury with decorative elements drawn from local cultures. Between 1961 and 1985, Intercontinental's head designer, Neal Prince, designed interiors and branding for 135 hotels.

The chain was officially rebranded as Inter•Continental Hotels in 1966, with the name commonly spelled with a hyphen as Inter-Continental when typed.

In 1972, Inter-Continental started a line of moderately priced hotels, called Forum Hotels. The first Forum property was the Lee Gardens Hotel in Hong Kong. Inter-Continental opened its first hotel in the United States in 1973, when it assumed management of the Mark Hopkins Hotel in San Francisco.

=== Post-Pan Am era ===
Facing significant financial losses, Pan Am sold their profitable Inter-Continental Hotels division to Grand Metropolitan on 19 August 1981 for $500 million. On 1 April 1982, the new owners merged their existing chain of 17 Grand Metropolitan Hotels into Inter-Continental and its sibling chain Forum Hotels.

Later in 1982, Inter-Continental formed a joint venture with Scanticon International, a Danish company that had opened a highly successful conference hotel near Princeton, New Jersey in 1981. Inter-Continental owned 80% of the business, with Scanticon controlling 20%. Additional Scanticon conference hotels were opened in Minneapolis and Denver, before InterContinental exited the joint venture in 1991.

Grand Metropolitan sold Inter-Continental Hotels to the Tokyo-based Seibu Saison Group on 1 October 1988 for $2.27 billion, for a profit of $850 million after taxes. On 20 February 1998, the Saison Group sold the chain to British brewer Bass PLC, for $2.9 billion.

In 2000, Bass sold its namesake brewing business, along with its name and red triangle trademark, to Interbrew, for £2.3 billion. On 27 June 2001, Bass renamed itself Six Continents, focusing on its hotels and its 2000 restaurants and bars. The name Six Continents was chosen from among 10,000 staff submissions, and was already the name of the Inter-Continental Hotels loyalty club. In 2003, Six Continents demerged its bar and pubs business into a separate company, Mitchells & Butlers, and the hospitality company was renamed InterContinental Hotels Group. At the same time, Inter-Continental Hotels dropped the hyphen in its name and became InterContinental Hotels. The chain is one of numerous brands today within the company.

== Notable properties ==
InterContinental Los Angeles Downtown, located within the Wilshire Grand Center in downtown Los Angeles, is the largest InterContinental in the Americas and the tallest building in Los Angeles.

InterContinental manages the Willard InterContinental Hotel in downtown Washington, D.C., two blocks east of the White House. The 179-year-old hotel has hosted many heads of state.

The Inter-Continental Kabul opened in 1969, but ceased operation following the Soviet invasion of Afghanistan in 1979. The hotel continues to operate independently using the Inter-Continental name, but unaffiliated with the chain.

== Properties ==
=== 2003–2010 ===
		Americas	Europe, Middle East, & Africa	Asia-Pacific	Total
2003	Properties	46	63	26	135
2003	Rooms	15,074	20,842	9,130	45,046
2004	Properties	44	62	26	132
2004	Rooms	15,088	20,292	9,136	44,516
2005	Properties	45	65	27	137
2005	Rooms	15,328	21,473	9,461	46,262
2006	Properties	49	66	33	148
2006	Rooms	16,525	21,423	11,651	49,599
2007	Properties	50	62	37	149
2007	Rooms	16,624	20,012	14,126	50,762
2008	Properties	55	64	40	159
2008	Rooms	18,502	20,836	15,398	54,736
2009	Properties	55	65	46	166
2009	Rooms	18,499	20,586	17,036	56,121
2010	Properties	56	64	51	171
2010	Rooms	19,120	20,111	19,198	58,429

=== 2011–2017 ===
		Americas	Europe	Asia, Middle East, & Africa	Greater China	Total
2011	Properties	52	30	64	23	169
2011	Rooms	17,598	9,664	20,425	9,911	57,598
2012	Properties	53	30	65	22	170
2012	Rooms	17,756	9,394	20,791	9,373	57,314
2013	Properties	51	31	67	29	178
2013	Rooms	17,453	9,525	21,383	11,742	60,103
2014	Properties	50	30	67	33	180
2014	Rooms	16,897	9,372	21,424	13,542	61,235
2015	Properties	50	32	68	34	184
2015	Rooms	17,109	9,886	21,238	13,807	62,040
2016	Properties	48	31	69	39	187
2016	Rooms	16,408	9,724	21,203	16,315	63,650
2017	Properties	50	32	72	40	194
2017	Rooms	17,578	9,889	21,902	16,629	65,998

=== From 2018 ===
		Americas	Europe, Middle East, Asia, & Africa	Greater China	Total
2018	Properties	51	106	47	204
2018	Rooms	17,753	32,299	19,229	69,281
2019	Properties	51	113	48	212
2019	Rooms	17,896	33,515	19,570	70,981
2020	Properties	46	108	51	205
2020	Rooms	16,789	32,474	20,678	69,941
2021	Properties	43	108	53	204
2021	Rooms	15,651	32,561	21,190	69,402
2022	Properties	42	111	54	207
2022	Rooms	15,541	32,861	21,404	69,806
2023	Properties	43	119	60	222
2023	Rooms	15,674	34,443	23,383	73,500
