= El Hank Lighthouse =

Lighthouse in Casablanca, Morocco

Coordinates: 33°36′36″N 7°39′17″W

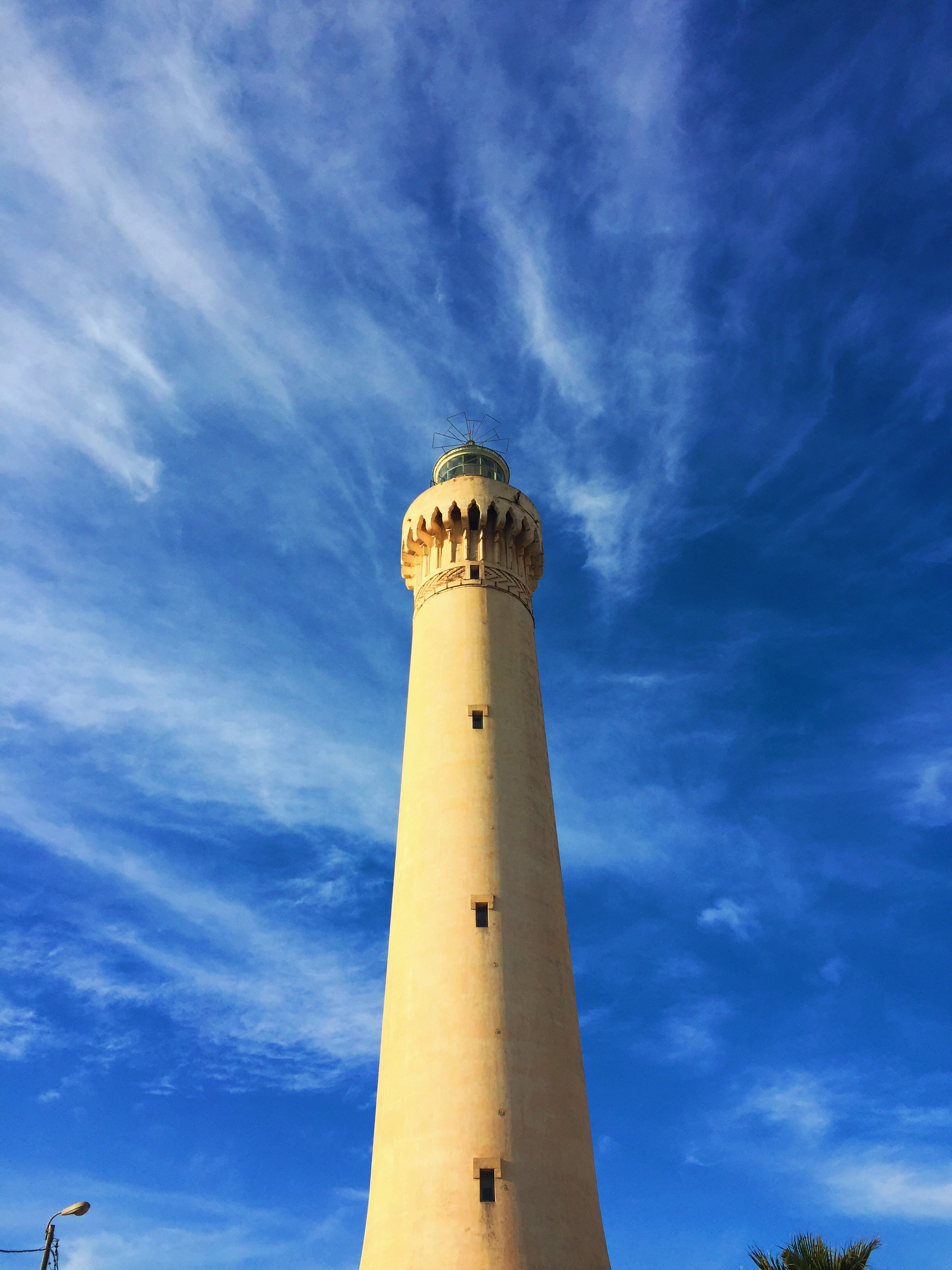
El Hank Lighthouse

The El Hank lighthouse is a lighthouse located on the tip of El Hank, west of the port of Casablanca. It is managed by the Port and Maritime Authority within the Ministry of Equipment, Transport, Logistics and Water.

== History ==
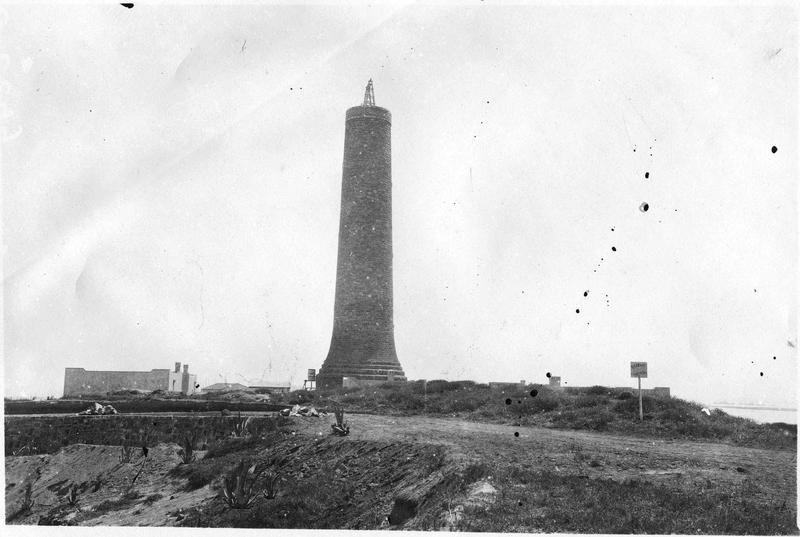
The lighthouse under construction, 19 May 1916

This lighthouse, which bears the name of the point where it was built, is the tallest lighthouse in Morocco. It was restored by the French architect Albert Laprade who redesigned the ridge and landscaped its surroundings in 1916, inspired by the ancient minarets. It came into operation in 1920 and helped the development of the city of Casablanca, as it facilitated access to the port, which was previously considered dangerous.

The lighthouse of El Hank is 51 m high (with a base of 6.60 m) and has a diameter of 39 m at its base. It is equipped with a 2nd order Fresnel lens and the lighting apparatus has 6 panels of 0.70 m, rotating on mercury. With an intensity equivalent to 2.1 million candelas, the lighthouse has a luminous range of 30 nautical miles (about 55 kilometers). It emits three grouped flashes every 15 seconds.

The lighthouse of El Hank is open to visitors and is one of the tourist highlights of Casablanca. It is necessary to climb 256 steps to reach the upper platform.

Identifier: ARLHS : MOR006 - Admiralty: D2574 - NGA : 23132.
