= United States Post Office (Ithaca, New York) =

- US Post Office-Ithaca
- U.S. National Register of Historic Places
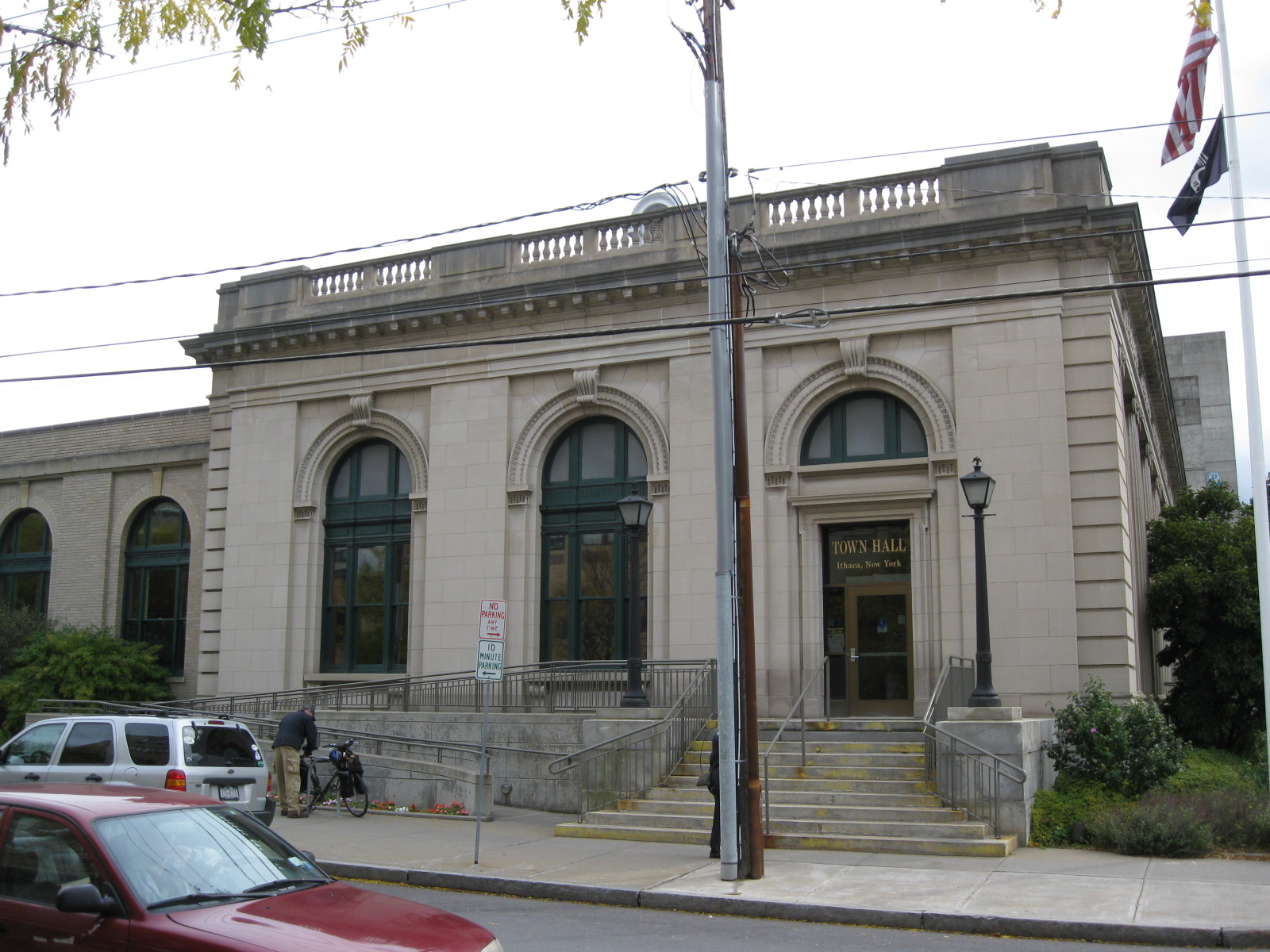
- Ithaca Town Hall, October 2009

- Location within New York Location within the United States
- Interactive map of US Post Office-Ithaca
- Location: 213 N. Tioga St., Ithaca, New York
- Coordinates: 42°26′28″N 76°29′48″W
- Area: less than one acre
- Built: 1909
- Architect: US Treasury Dept.; Taylor, James Knox
- Architectural style: Classical Revival, French Baroque
- MPS: US Post Offices in New York State, 1858-1943, TR
- NRHP reference No.: 88002514
- Added to NRHP: May 11, 1989

US Post Office-Ithaca is a historic post office building located at Ithaca in Tompkins County, New York. It was designed and built in 1909 and is one of a number of post offices in New York State designed by the Office of the Supervising Architect of the Treasury Department, James Knox Taylor.

It was listed on the National Register of Historic Places in 1989.

In 2000, the building was rehabilitated and converted into the Ithaca Town Hall. The USPS operates 5000 sq ft of the property as a postal store.

== Gallery ==
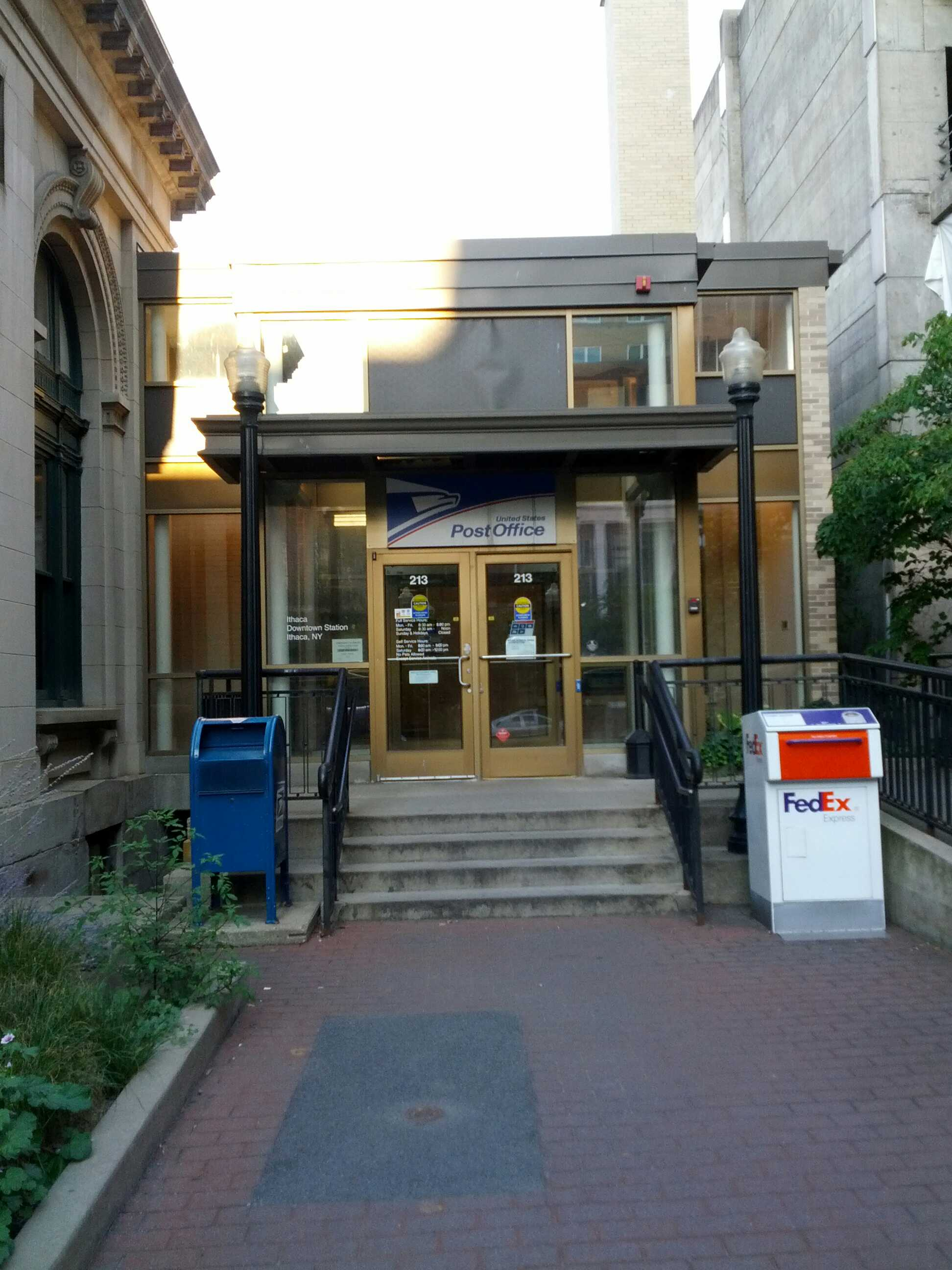
Post Office entrance, September 2012
