= Hjorthagen Church =

Coordinates: 59.3550°N 18.1033°E

- Hjorthagens kyrka
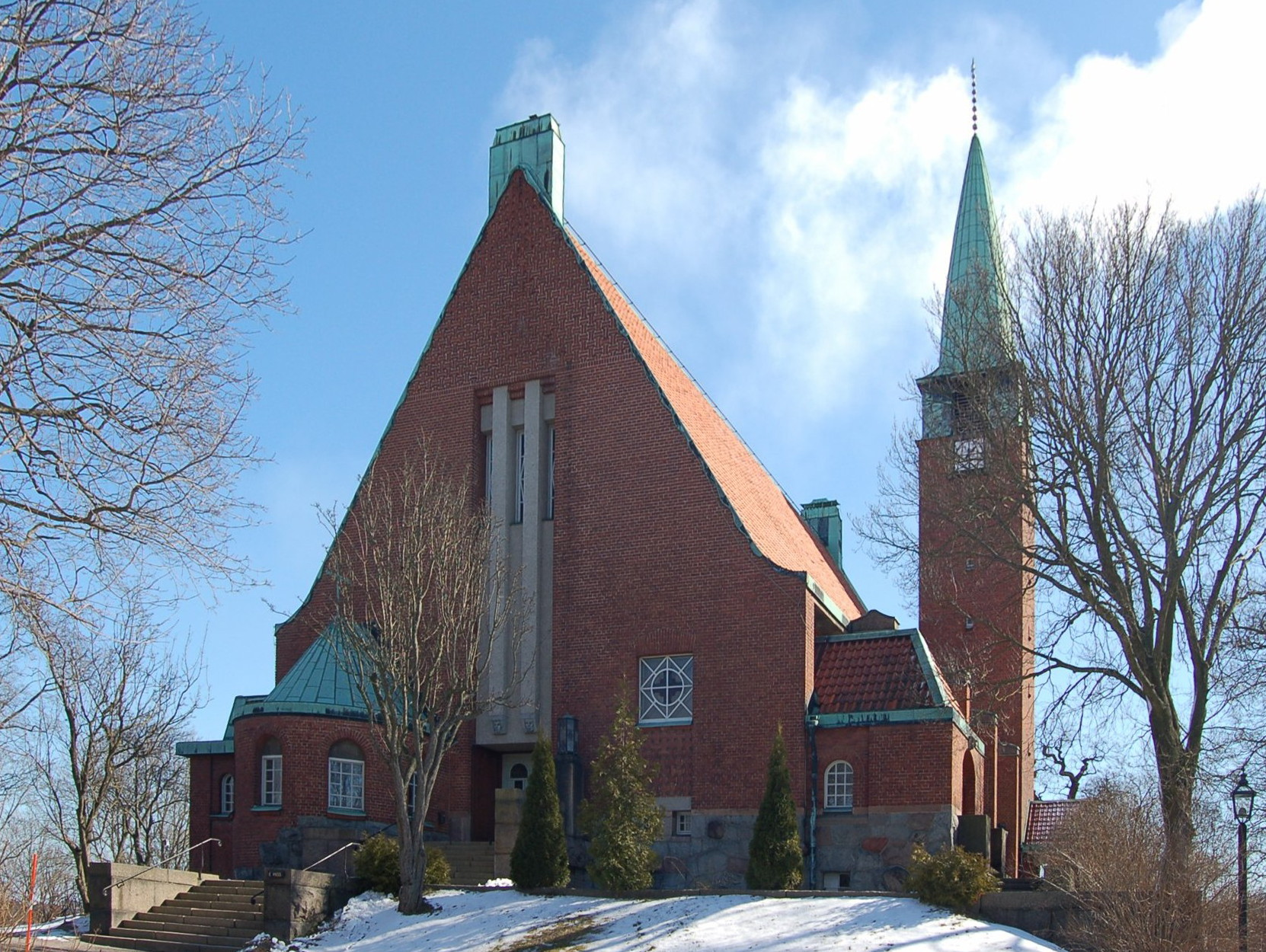
- The Hjorthagen Church in April 2006
- Hjorthagen Church
- Location: Hjorthagen
- Country: Sweden
- Denomination: Church of Sweden

History
- Consecrated: 25 March 1909

Architecture
- Architect: Carl Bergsten

Administration
- Diocese: Stockholm
- Parish: Engelbrekt

The Hjorthagen Church (Swedish: Hjorthagens kyrka) is a church building at Dianavägen at Hjorthagen in Stockholm, Sweden. It belongs to the Engelbrekt Parish of the Church of Sweden. Construction began in 1907 and the church was inaugurated on 25 March 1909 by archbishop Johan August Ekman.
