= Bucharest Russian Church =

Orthodox church in Bucharest, Romania

Coordinates: 44°26′1.66″N 26°6′5.95″E

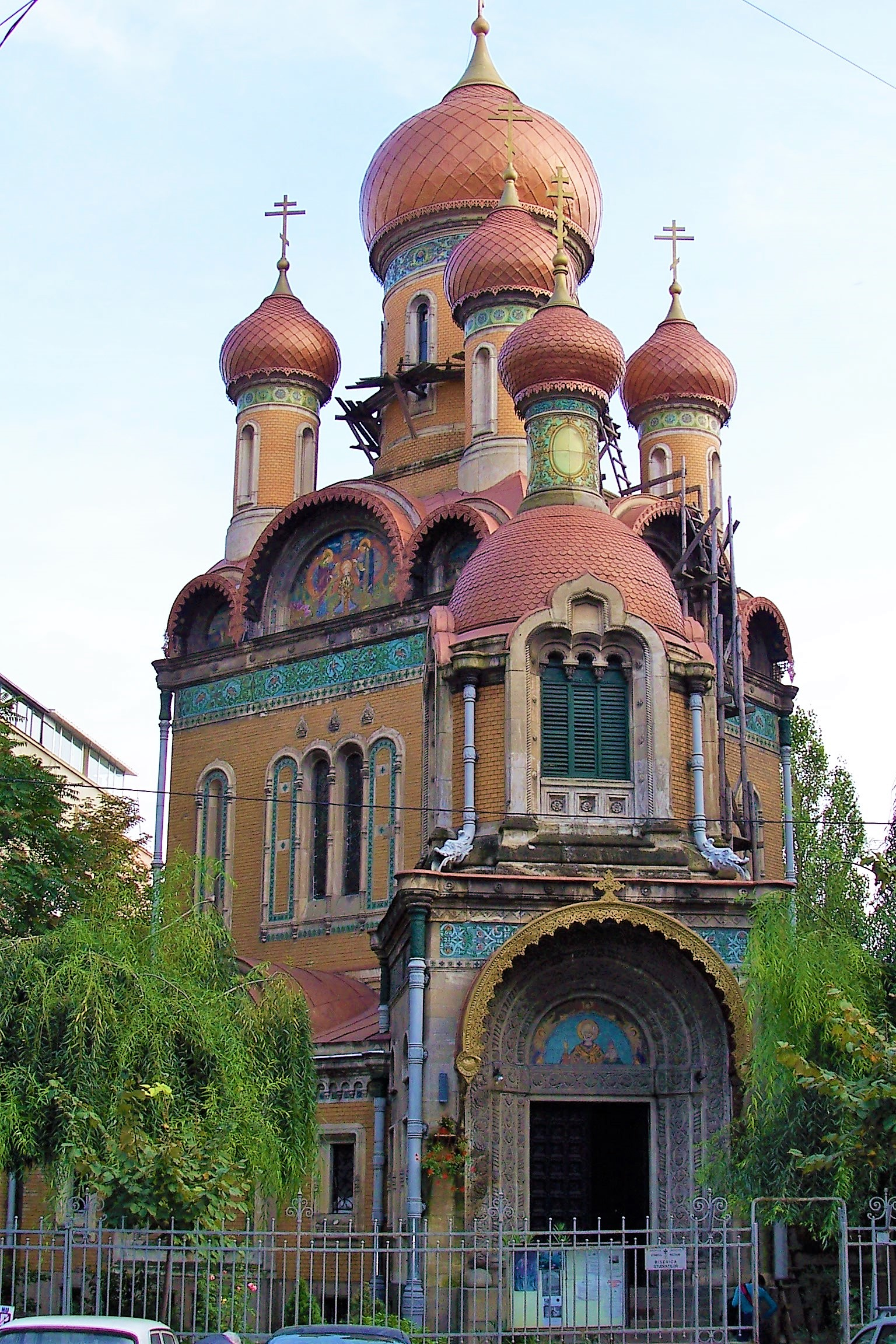
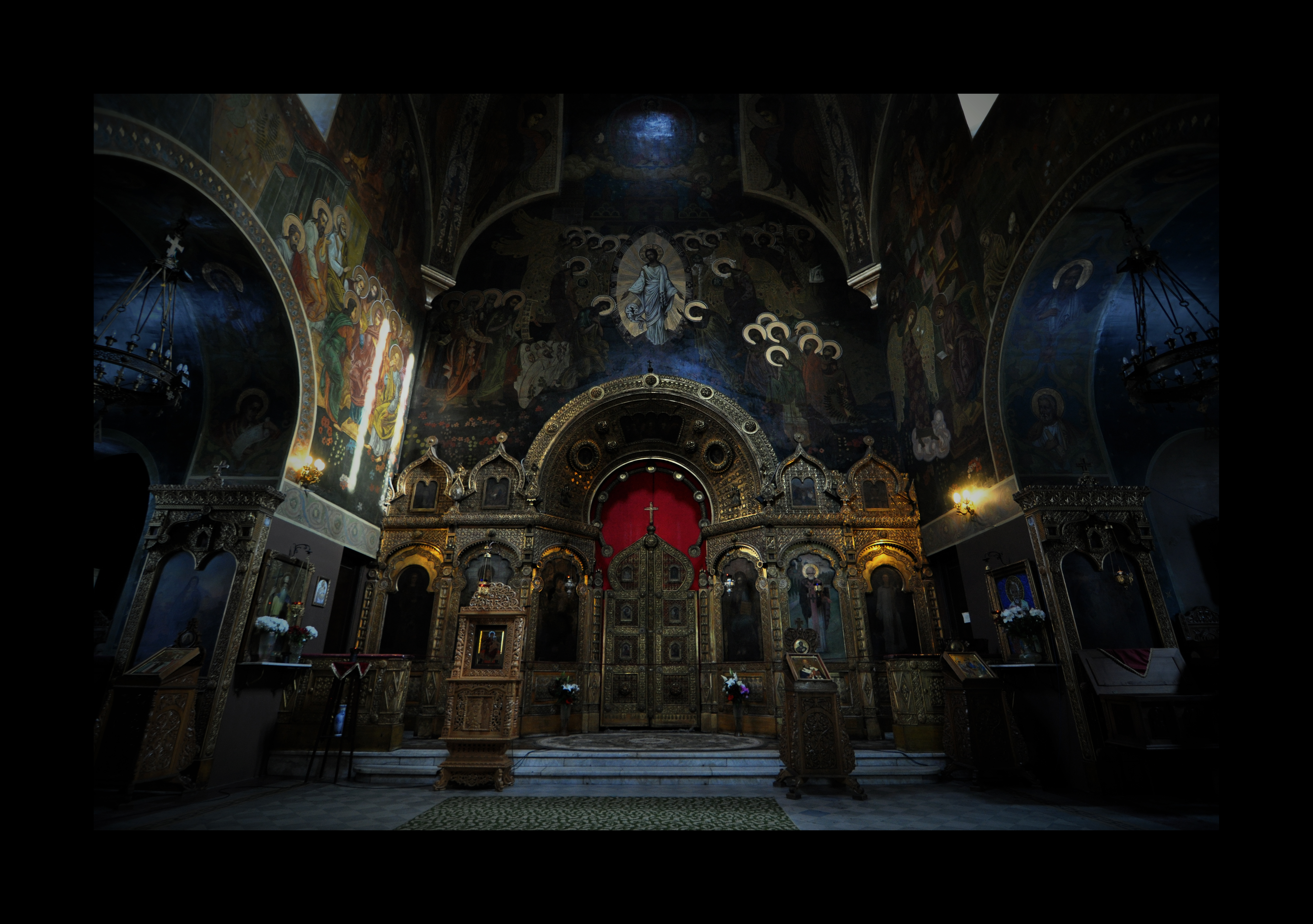
The exterior and interior of the church

St. Nicholas Russian Church (Romanian: Biserica Rusă) is located in central Bucharest, Romania, just off University Square. Russian Ambassador Mikhail Nikolaevich Giers initiated the building of a Russian Orthodox church in central Bucharest in 1905. It was meant mainly for the use of the legation employees, as well as for Russians living in the capital city of the Kingdom of Romania.

The Court of Emperor Nicholas II provided the funds needed for the building (600,000 gold rubles). The structure occupies a surface of 350 m^{2} (3,800 sq ft) and it was set in brick and stone. The seven domes (taking the shape of onion domes — characteristic of Russia, but unusual in Romania) were initially covered in gold. The iconostasis was carved in wood and then covered in gold, following the model of Church of the Twelve Apostles in the Moscow Kremlin.

The church was finished in 1909, and it was sanctified on November 25, 1909. During World War I, just before the start of the occupation of Bucharest by the Central Powers, it was closed, while all valuables and the archives were transported to Iași and then farther to Saint Petersburg, where they vanished during the Russian Revolution of 1917. After the war, physical damage was repaired by the Russian community in Bucharest, with services starting again in 1921. As the service was held in Old Church Slavonic, it was also attended by ethnic Bulgarians and Serbs in the Romanian capital.

As the old Russian priest had died, in 1935 the church was transferred under the authority of the Romanian Government, which meant it for the use of the students and professors at the University of Bucharest. In 1947, at the request of Soviet authorities, the church passed once again under the Patriarchate of Moscow, which named a new Russian priest, also providing the funds for its refurbishment. In 1957 Patriarch Alexius I decided to pass it again to the Romanian Orthodox Church, which had it restored once again. It was sanctified again in 1967 and in 1992 it was again given for the use of the students and professors at the University of Bucharest. Because of its present congregation it is also known as Biserica studenților ("The students' church").

St. Nicholas Church remained under the jurisdiction of the Russian Patriarchate from 1909 until 1934, when Nicolae Titulescu, at that time the head of the Romanian diplomacy, arranged it to be given to the administration of the University of Bucharest. On May 5, 1947, the retreat came under the jurisdiction of Moscow until 1957, when it again became the property of the Romanian Orthodoxy, having the status of the church of exaltation.

In 1947, Pavel Statov, a representative of the Moscow Patriarchate, was repaired and the painting was renovated in 1948 by the painter Anatolie Cudinov, and the repairs in 1967 by the painters Eugen Profeta, Victor Zenlichika, and Victor Kostyurin. After the 1977 earthquake, the great tower was cracked, consolidating the entire edifice and reconditioning the painting. Work began in 2000, there being a time-lag due to lack of funds.

In 1992, the Blessed Teoctist Father, Patriarch of the Romanian Orthodox Church, attributed to the students the Church of Saint Nicholas (formerly the Russian Church), who thus regains, after 45 years, the Paraclis of the University of Bucharest. Thus, with care and parental love, students welcomed the strong desire to have a church dedicated to missionary work in the student environment.
