= Michel Pinseau =

French architect

Michel Pinseau (1926 – 15 September 1999) was a French architect. He is known for his conception of the second tallest minaret in the world, Hassan II Mosque in Casablanca, Morocco.

== Career ==
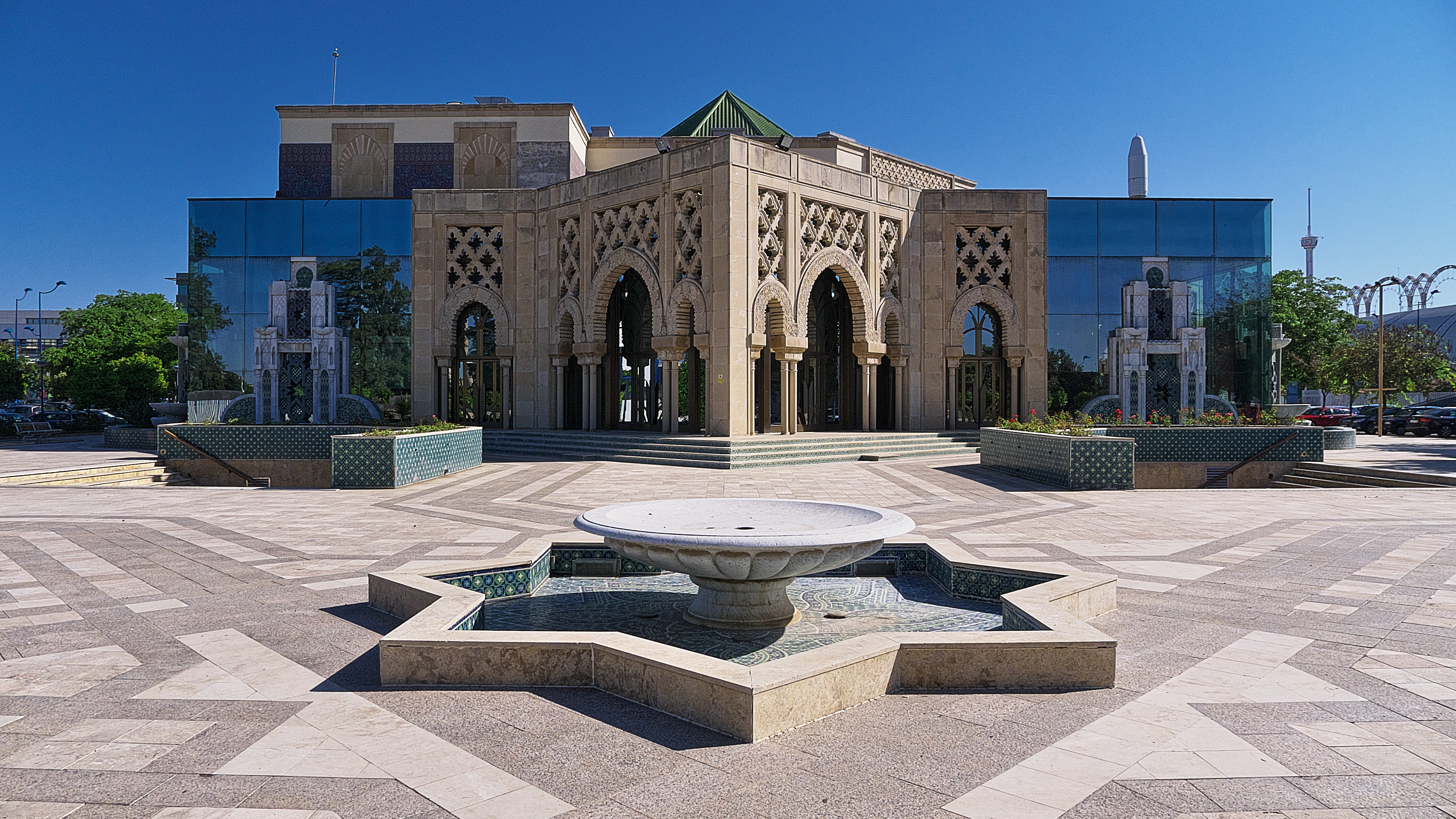
Seville Universal Exhibition 1992 Morocco Pavilion (1992)

Michel Pinseau graduated from École Nationale Supérieure des Beaux-Arts in Paris in 1956. He then worked on many projects in the French capital especially in the Champs-Elysées area.

Pinseau was known as Hassan II's architect. They met in the 1970s and from then Pinseau worked on many projects in Morocco.

Pinseau died on 15 September 1999 in Paris.
