= Moshe Mayer =

Romanian-Israeli architect, real estate developer and businessman (1909 - 1993)

Moshe Mayer (Hebrew: משה מאיר; October 25, 1909 - September 23, 1993) was a Romanian-Israeli architect, real estate developer and businessman. He was noted especially for his luxury hotels, including the Ducor Intercontinental Hotel in Monrovia (1960) and the Hotel Ivoire in Abidjan (1963) and his skyscrapers and residential palaces in Tel Aviv and other cities. His achievements in real estate and hotels in the 1960s saw him hailed by Haaretz as "man of the year" in 1970. They said of him, "The State of Israel is too small for Moshe Mayer. He is constructing housing, skyscrapers and luxury hotels, and building rivieras and presidential palaces. For over 20 years he has been hopping to and fro ... spending most of his time in airplanes or at his Geneva headquarters." By 1967 he was the wealthiest man in Israel and became Chairman of Mafit Trust Corporation Ltd. of Geneva, Switzerland. Due to his extreme wealth he amassed an extensive valuable art collection including many van Gogh originals which he left to the Tel Aviv Museum of Art before he died in September 1993 in Tel Aviv where he had lived for much of his life.
