= List of tallest structures built before the 20th century =

List of pre-twentieth century structures by height

Name	Municipality (current)	Country (current)	Height		Completed	Comments
Name	Municipality (current)	Country (current)	(feet)	(metres)	Completed	Comments
Eiffel Tower	Paris	France	986	300	1889	Was tallest structure on Earth from 1889 to 1930.
New Brighton Tower	New Brighton	United Kingdom	567	173	1898–1900	Tower dismantled from 1919.
Kanishka stupa	Peshawar	Pakistan	393~557	120~170 (Or taller)	200	Destroyed by White Huns in 460 CE.
Washington Monument	Washington, D.C.	United States	555	169	1884	Was tallest structure on Earth from 1884 to 1889.
Mole Antonelliana	Turin	Italy	549.54	167.5	1889	Was formally tallest building on Earth from 1889 to 1908.
Philadelphia City Hall	Philadelphia	United States	548	167	1894	Considered to be the tallest building in the world from 1894 to 1908
Ulm Minster	Ulm	Germany	529.92	161.53	1890	Was tallest building on Earth from 1890 to 1894.
Lincoln Cathedral	Lincoln	United Kingdom	525	160	1311	Was tallest structure on Earth from 1311 to 1548.
Blackpool Tower	Blackpool	United Kingdom	518	158	1894	
Cologne Cathedral	Cologne	Germany	516	157	1880	Was tallest structure on Earth from 1880 to 1884, and tallest building on Earth from 1880 to 1890.
Yongning Pagoda	Luoyang	China	448	137~154.95 (Or taller)	516	Burned to the ground in 534 after being struck by lightning. Was possible tallest structure on Earth at the time it was buit.
Beauvais Cathedral	Beauvais	France	156 (choir); 502 (tower)	47.5 (choir); 153 (tower)	1272/1569	From 1569 to 1573, the tower was the tallest structure on Earth.
Rouen Cathedral	Rouen	France	495	151	1876	Was tallest structure on Earth from 1876 to 1880.
St. Mary's Church	Stralsund	Germany	495	151	1625	Was tallest structure on Earth from 1548 to 1569 and from 1573 to 1647, when spire was destroyed. Reconstructed with about 104 metres.
Old St. Paul's Cathedral	London	United Kingdom	493	150.2	1221	Spire destroyed in 1561. Completely destroyed in 1666. Was tallest structure on Earth from 1221 to 1311.
St. Nikolai	Hamburg	Germany	482	147	1874	Was tallest structure on Earth from 1874 to 1876.
Great Pyramid	Giza	Egypt	481	146.6	c. 2570 BC	Was tallest structure on Earth from 2570 BC~ to 516 AD and from 532 to 1221, if Yongning Pagoda surpassed its height, or from 2570 BC~ to 1221 if it wasn't. One of the Seven Wonders of the Ancient World.
Pyramid of Khafre	Giza	Egypt	475	143	c. 2530 BC	
Strasbourg Cathedral	Strasbourg	France	472	142	1439	Was tallest structure on Earth from 1647 to 1874, between the St. Mary's Church spire collapse and the construction of the Church of St. Nicholas.
Halsbrücker Esse	Halsbrücke	Germany	459	140	1889	
St. Peter's Basilica		Vatican City	452	138	1626	
St. Stephen's Cathedral	Vienna	Austria	448	c. 136.74	1433	
St. Lambert's Cathedral	Liège	Belgium	443	135	1391	Dismantled from 1794.
St. Martin's Church	Landshut	Germany	428	130.6	1500	Tallest brickwork tower in the world.
Lepsius I Pyramid	Abu Rawash	Egypt	423.2~	129~	2650 BC~	Its existence is subject of debate
Amiens Cathedral	Amiens	France	415	126.6	1533	
St. Mary's	Lübeck	Germany	410	125	1350	Second tallest brickwork tower in the world.
St. Olaf's Church	Tallinn	Estonia	407	124	1519	Spire destroyed in 1625.
Cathedral of Our Lady	Antwerp	Belgium	404	123	1521	
Salisbury Cathedral	Salisbury	United Kingdom	404	123	1320	
Belltower of Peter and Paul Cathedral	Saint Petersburg	Russia	401	122.5	1733	Was tallest building in Russia from 1733 to 1952.
Jetavanaramaya	Anuradhapura	Sri Lanka	400	122	273–301	
Basilica of San Gaudenzio	Novara	Italy	397	121	1887	
Phra Pathommachedi	Nakhon Pathom	Thailand	396	120.45	1870	The original stupa was built during the Dvaravati era around 193 BCE, with a recorded height of 84 metres. The current structure was rebuilt over the previous stupa, encasing it within.
Uppsala Cathedral	Uppsala	Sweden	389	118.7	19th century	Current height dates back to the last major alterations done in 1893. Tallest structure in the Nordic countries before the 20th century.
Pharos Lighthouse	Alexandria	Egypt	338~387	103~118 (Or taller)	c. 280 BC	One of the Seven Wonders of the Ancient World. Was tallest building on Earth from 280 BC to 1180 AD. Destroyed by earthquakes in 1303 and 1323.
Sint-Walburgiskerk	Zutphen	Netherlands	384	117	16th century	Current height: 76 m. Until 1600, the church was 117 m tall and the highest structure in the Netherlands before the 20th century.
Potala Palace	Lhasa	China	384	117	1694	
Freiburg Minster	Freiburg im Breisgau	Germany	380.7	116	c. 1330	
Church of Our Lady	Bruges	Belgium	379.3	115.6	c. 1465	Third tallest brickwork tower in the world.
St. Andrew's Church	Hildesheim	Germany	376	114.5	1883	Tallest church tower in Lower Saxony.
Florence Cathedral	Florence	Italy	375	114.5	1436	Florence Cathedral has the world's largest unreinforced brick dome.
Torrazzo of Cremona	Cremona	Italy	369.75	112.7	1309	
Shwedagon Pagoda	Yangon	Myanmar	367	112	1775	Successively rebuilt taller: 18m (1362); 40m (1462)
Hamburg City Hall	Hamburg	Germany	367	112	1897	
New St. Paul's Cathedral	London	United Kingdom	365	111.2	1677	Built after the destruction of Old St. Paul's.
New York World Building	New York City	United States	361	110	1890	Tallest building in the United States until Philadelphia City Hall in 1901.
Seven-Story Pagoda at Shōkoku-ji	Kyoto	Japan	358	109.1	1399	Destroyed by fire in 1403.
Dom Tower of Utrecht	Utrecht	Netherlands	358	109	1382	Restored in 1912 to reach current height of 112 metres.
Nieuwe Kerk (Delft)	Delft	Netherlands	356.79	108.75	1895	
Milwaukee City Hall	Milwaukee	United States	353	108	1895	
Les Invalides	Paris	France	351	107	1706	
Campanile of Shuya Cathedral	Shuya	Russia	347.7	106	1833	Campanile is part of Shuya Cathedral.
Chaturbhuj Temple	Orchha	India	344	104.8	c. 1558	Chaturbhuj Temple dedicated to Vishnu was the tallest structure in the Indian subcontinent from 1558 to 1970.
Red Pyramid	Dahshur	Egypt	345	105	c. 2600 BC	Was tallest structure on Earth from 2590 BC~ to 2570 BC~.
Bent Pyramid	Dahshur	Egypt	344	104.71	2600 BC~	
St. Catherine's Church	Hoogstraten	Belgium	343.5	104.7	1548	
Giralda	Seville	Spain	330	104.1	1568	88 m when was constructed in 1171; built it higher in 1568.
Palace of Justice	Brussels	Belgium	341	104	1883	
Old City Hall (Toronto)	Toronto	Canada	340	103.6	1899	Largest civic building in North America prior to 20th century.
Cathedral of Christ the Saviour	Moscow	Russia	339.5	103.5	1883	Original church was demolished in 1931. Was rebuilt with concrete in 1994-1999.
Vienna City Hall	Vienna	Austria	339	103.3	1883	
Cathedral of St. Bartholomew (Plzeň)	Plzeň	Czech Republic	335	103	c. 1480	Construction begun in 1342.
St Martin's Cathedral	Ypres	Belgium	335	102	1370	
Saint Isaac's Cathedral	Saint Petersburg	Russia	331.36	101.52	1858	
Świdnica Cathedral	Świdnica	Poland	332	101	1565	
Shwesandaw Pagoda	Bagan	Myanmar	328+	100+	c. 1057	100 metres tall without counting its hti spire
St. Patrick's Cathedral (Midtown Manhattan)	New York City	United States	329.6	100.5	1888	
Esztergom Basilica	Esztergom	Hungary	328	100	1856	It has 17 meter thick walls and is the third biggest basilica in Europe.
East Seven-Story Pagoda at Tōdai-ji	Nara	Japan	328	100	c. 743	Burned down by war in 1181
West Seven-Story Pagoda at Tōdai-ji	Nara	Japan	328	100	c. 743	Burned down by lightning in 943.
Shwemawdaw Pagoda	Bago	Myanmar	324	98.8	1796	Raised to 125 m (hti spire inclusive) in 1954.
St Mark's Campanile	Venice	Italy	323	98.6	1514	
Onze Lieve Vrouwetoren	Amersfoort	Netherlands	322.6	98.33	1470	
St Vitus Church	Hilversum	Netherlands	321.5	98	1892	
St. Rumbold's Cathedral	Mechelen	Belgium	319	97.28	c. 1520	Original project of 167 meter tall tower was not built due to lack of money.
Torre Asinelli	Bologna	Italy	318.9	97.2	before 1185	
Grote Kerk (Breda)	Breda	Netherlands	318.24	97	1547	
Martinitoren	Groningen	Netherlands	318.24	96.8	c. 1550	
Great Lavra Bell Tower	Kyiv	Ukraine	316	96.5	1745	
Brussels Town Hall	Brussels	Belgium	315	96	1454	
Norwich Cathedral	Norwich	United Kingdom	315	96	1480	Building of current spire commenced.
Latting Observatory	New York City	United States	315	96	1853	Shortened by 75 feet in 1855; destroyed by fire in 1856.
Martinikerk (Doesburg)	Doesburg	Netherlands	308.5	94	c. 1430	
Red Town Hall	Berlin	Germany	308	94	1869	
Church of St Walburge, Preston	Preston	United Kingdom	308.5	94	1873	
Osijek Co-cathedral	Osijek	Croatia	308.5	94	1898	
Sint-Jacobus de Meerderekerk	The Hague	Netherlands	308.5	94	1878	
Pyramid of Meidum	Meidum	Egypt	305.1	93.5	2610 BC~	Was tallest structure on Earth from 2610 BC~ to 2600 BC~.
St Eusebius' Church, Arnhem	Arnhem	Netherlands	305	93	1550	
Saint Vincent's Church	Eeklo	Belgium	305	93	1883	
St James Cathedral	Toronto	Canada	305	92.9	1874	
Statue of Liberty	New York City	United States	305	92.9	1886	
Grote or Sint-Jacobskerk	The Hague	Netherlands	303.5	92.5	1424	
New Cathedral of Salamanca	Salamanca	Spain	301,8	92	1733	
Ruwanwelisaya	Anuradhapura	Sri Lanka	301	92	c. 140 BC	
Lakshmi Vilas Palace	Vadodara	India	300	91.44	1890	
Notre-Dame de Paris	Paris	France	300	91.44	1345	Spire destroyed on April 15, 2019 (Notre-Dame fire).
Etemenanki	Babylon	Iraq	298.56	91	c. 601 BC	Ziggurat dedicated to Marduk. Alleged to have originally been built, to an unknown height, between the 14th and 9th centuries BC, then destroyed in 689 BC by Sennacherib. Rebuilt c. 600 BC by Nebuchadnezzar II. Finally demolished by Alexander the Great in 323 BC.
Belfry of Ghent	Ghent	Belgium	298.5	91	1380	
Abdijtoren	Middelburg	Netherlands	296.6	90.4	1350–1400	
Coventry Cathedral	Coventry	United Kingdom	295	90	1500	
Dormition Cathedral	Kharkiv	Ukraine	294	89.5	1841	
St Bavo's Cathedral	Ghent	Belgium	292	89	1569	
Torre del Mangia	Siena	Italy	289	88	1348	
St Walburga Church	Oudenaarde	Belgium	289	88	1627	
United States Capitol Building	Washington, D.C.	United States	288	87	1866	
Westerkerk	Amsterdam	Netherlands	285	87	1631	
Belfry of Mons	Mons	Belgium	285	87	1669	
Kostol Nanebovzatia Panny Márie	Spišská Nová Ves	Slovakia	285	87	1894	
St Medardus Church	Wervik	Belgium	282	86	1433	
Grote of Sint-Clemenskerk	Steenwijk	Netherlands	282	86	15th century	
Rajabai Clock Tower	Bombay (now Mumbai)	India	280	85.3	1878	
Beyazıt Tower	Istanbul	Turkey	279	85	1828	
Liaodi Pagoda	Dingzhou	China	276	84	1055	
Cathedral of Our Lady	Aarschot	Belgium	276	84	1337	
St Tillo Church	Izegem	Belgium	276	84	1868	
Brooklyn Bridge	New York City	United States	276	84	1883	
Đakovo Cathedral	Đakovo	Croatia	276	84	1882	
St Willibrordus Church, Berchem	Antwerp	Belgium	276	84	1891	
St Martin's Church	Kortrijk	Belgium	272	83	1466	
Belfry of Bruges	Bruges	Belgium	272	83	1487	
Sint-Petrus' Stoel van Antiochiëkerk	Sittard	Netherlands	272	83	c. 1505	
St Gummarus Church	Lier	Belgium	272	83	1540	
Tournai Cathedral	Tournai	Belgium	272	83	1700	
Panthéon	Paris	France	272	83	1790	
Church of the Assumption of the Blessed Virgin Mary	Kraków	Poland	269	82	1397	
St. Mary's Church	Gdańsk	Poland	269	82	1502	
Cunerakerk	Rhenen	Netherlands	268.4	81.8	1531	
Pagoda of Hosshō-ji	Kyoto	Japan	265.7	81	1083	Destroyed by fire in 1342.
Troitskaya Tower	Moscow	Russia	262	80	1499	The tallest of the Moscow Kremlin Towers.
Hwangryongsa	Gyeongju	South Korea	262	80	660	Built by the Silla kingdom following their defeat of Baekjae. Burned by the Mongols in 1238.
St. Christopher's Cathedral, Roermond	Roermond	Netherlands	261	79.7	1663	
St Salvator's Cathedral	Bruges	Belgium	259	79	1350, 1871	
Sint-Janskerk	Maastricht	Netherlands	259	79	1450–1500	
Pyramid of Senusret III	Dahshur	Egypt	256	78	1871 BC~	
Clifton Hill Shot Tower	Melbourne	Australia	256	78	1882	The Clifton Hill Shot Tower held the title of Australia's tallest structure from its construction until 1930. The landmark has been proclaimed as the world's tallest shot tower by Guinness World Records.
Municipal Corporation Building	Bombay (now Mumbai)	India	255	77.7	1893	
Umayyad Mosque minaret of Isa	Damascus	Syria	253	77	9th century	It would be later destroyed but rebuilt by both the Ayyubid and Ottoman Empire.
Kutubiyya Mosque	Marrakesh	Morocco	253	77	1195	
Parish Church Saints Nicholas and Stephen	Eggenfelden	Germany	253	77	1519	
Victoria Terminus (Renamed to Chhatrapati Shivaji Terminus)	Bombay (now Mumbai)	India	250	76.2	1888	Data obtained from UNESCO document to ensure authenticity.
Beisi Pagoda	Suzhou	China	249	76	1153	
St Nicholas Church	Ghent	Belgium	249	76	1300–1330	Construction completed early in the 14th century, with further extensions during the following centuries to accommodate the growing population.
Aa-kerk	Groningen	Netherlands	249	76	1718	The church's current tower was built between 1711 and 1718, after previous versions collapsed in 1671 and 1710.
Clérigos Church	Porto	Portugal	248	75.6	1750	
Wakefield Cathedral	Wakefield	United Kingdom	247	75.3	1420	
Black Pyramid	Dahshur	Egypt	246~	75~	1850 BC~	
Great Pyramid of Toniná	Toniná	Mexico	246	75	850	Tallest pre-Columbian building in the Americas.
Oude Kerk (Delft)	Delft	Netherlands	246	75	1350	
Abayagiriya	Anuradhapura	Sri Lanka	245	74.6	c. 103 BC	
Mahachaitya	Amaravathi	India	242	73	c. 300 BC	
Taj Mahal	Agra, Uttar Pradesh	India	240	73	1653	
Pyramid of Neferirkare	Abusir	Egypt	239	72.8	25th century BC	Today's structure rises only 52 metres above the ground.
Qutb Minar	Delhi	India	238	72.5	c. 1200	The tower is the tallest free-standing masonry structure in India, and was the tallest in the world until the completion of the Anaconda Smelter Stack in 1919.
La Danta Temple	El Mirador	Guatemala	236	72	300 BC	
Gonbad-e Qabus	Gonbad-e Qabus	Iran	236	72	1006	
Wawel Cathedral	Kraków	Poland	269	72	1364	
Minarets of Süleymaniye Mosque	Istanbul	Turkey	236	72	1558	
Main Admiralty Building	Saint Petersburg	Russia	236	72	1719	
Canterbury Cathedral	Canterbury	United Kingdom	235	71.6	1498	
York Minster	York	United Kingdom	235	71.6	1472	
Pyramid of the Sun	Teotihuacan	Mexico	233.6	71.2	100	
Leshan Giant Buddha	Leshan	China	233	71	804~	Was the tallest statue on Earth ever constructed from 804~ to 1967. A monolithic statue.
Minarets of Selimiye Mosque	Edirne	Turkey	239.5	70.89	1574	
The Ziggurat of Dur-Kurigalzu	Dur-Kurigalzu	Iraq	230	70	c. 1400 BC	
Sun Temple	Konark	India	229	70	1250	Structure was damaged, nowdays only 39 metres tall temple stands. Present height is that of surviving structure.
Belfry of Tournai	Tournai	Belgium	230	70	1294	
Qianxun Pagoda	Dali City	China	228	69.6	823–840	
Gloucester Cathedral	Gloucester	United Kingdom	225	69	1089–1499	
Mekane Selassie	Amhara	Ethiopia	225.07	68.6	c. 15th century	Destroyed by Adal Sultanate in the Ethiopian–Adal War in the 16th century.
General Post Office	Calcutta (now Kolkata)	India	220+	67+	1868	
Pagoda of Fogong Temple	Ying County	China	220	67.3	1056	
Pyramid of Djedefre	Abu Rawash	Egypt	220	67	2566–2558 BC~	Today stands only 11.4 metres high.
Bunker Hill Monument	Boston	United States	221	67	1843	
Husainabad Clock Tower	Lucknow	India	219	67	1881	
Galata Tower	Istanbul	Turkey	219	66.9	1348	
Great Pyramid of Cholula	Cholula	Mexico	217	66	200 BC	
Arunachaleswara Temple (Also called Annamalaiyar Temple)	Tiruvannamalai	India	217	66	9th century	
Brihadiswara Temple	Thanjavur	India	217	66	1010	Tallest structure of India when built.
Ely Cathedral	Ely	United Kingdom	217	66	1375	
Malbork Castle	Malbork	Poland	217	66	13th century	Castle belfry.
Thatbyinnyu Temple	Bagan	Myanmar	217	66	1150	
Pyramid of Menkaure	Giza	Egypt	215	65.5	2532-2504 BC~	Today stands 61 metres high.
Angkor Wat	Angkor	Cambodia	213	65	c. 1150	
Lviv Town Hall	Lviv	Ukraine	213.2	65	1835	
Jagannath Temple	Puri	India	213	65	1161	
Temple of the Two-Headed Serpent (Tikal Pyramid IV)	Tikal	Guatemala	212	64.6	c. 741	
Giant Wild Goose Pagoda	Xi'an	China	210	64	704	
Minarets of Sultan Ahmed Mosque	Istanbul	Turkey	210	64	1616	
Pyramid of Djoser	Saqqara	Egypt	205	62.5	2667–2648 BC~	Was tallest structure on Earth from 2667 BC~ to 2610 BC~.
Minaret of Jam	Shahrak District	Afghanistan	203	62	c. 1190	The minaret was built around 1190 entirely of baked bricks and is famous for its intricate brick, stucco and glazed tile decoration.
Gol Gumbaz	Bijapur (now Vijayapura)	India	203	61.9	1656	
Pyramid of Senusret I	Lisht	Egypt	201	61.25	1909–1894 BC~	
Saint Paul's Cathedral	Calcutta (now Kolkata)	India	201	61	1847	Earthquake caused damages to cathedral, its top was reconstructed to present height of 53.3 metres, including flagstaff.
Notre-Dame Basilica	Montreal	Canada	200	60	1843	
Kutlug Timur Minaret	Konye-Urgench	Turkmenistan	197	60	1011	
Liuhe Pagoda	Hangzhou	China	196	59.89	1165	
Srivilliputhur Andal temple	Srivilliputhur	India	194	59	14th–17th centuries	Precise date not available.
Ulagalantha Perumal Temple	Tirukoilur	India	194	59	15th–17th centuries	
Edo Castle	Tokyo	Japan	190.2~193,5	58~59	1457	Was tallest castle in Japan's history, now lost, only massive foundation remains.
Taroona Shot Tower	Hobart	Australia	192.6	58.7	1870	The Taroona Shot Tower held the title of Australia's tallest building between 1870 and 1875. It is the tallest cylindrical sandstone tower in the Southern Hemisphere.
Mirisawetiya Vihara	Anuradhapura	Sri Lanka	192	58.5	c. 161 BC	
Ekambareswarar Temple	Kanchipuram	India	192	58.5	1509–29	
Leaning Tower of Pisa	Pisa	Italy	191.47	58.36	1372	
Pyramid of Hawara	Hawara	Egypt	190.2	58	1860 BC ~ 1814 BC	
Leh Palace	Leh	India	190.3	58	c. 1610	
Pagoda of Tianning Temple	Beijing	China	189	57.8	1100–1120	
Tikal Pyramid V	Tikal	Guatemala	187	57	c. 700	
Cathedral of Saint Domnius	Split	Croatia	187	57	c. 13th century	
Hagia Sophia Cathedral	Istanbul	Turkey	184	56.1	537	
Charminar	Hyderabad	India	184	56	1591	
Zadar Cathedral	Zadar	Croatia	184	56	1894	
Kwidzyn Castle	Kwidzyn	Poland	183	56	1230	Castle belfry.
El Tigre	El Mirador	Guatemala	183	55.8	100	
Mahabodhi Temple	Bodh Gaya	India	180.4+	55+	5th / 6th century	Tallest structure of India until 1010 CE.
Pyramid of Amenemhat I	Lisht	Egypt	180.4	55	1991–1803 BC	Today's structure rises only 15 metres above the ground.
Tower of Hercules	A Coruña	Spain	216.5	55	1st century AD	
Main Pyramid of Calakmul	Calakmul	Mexico	180.4	55	100	
Western Buddha	Bamiyan	Afghanistan	180	55	591~644	Was the tallest statue on Earth ever constructed from 591–644 to 804~. Was destroyed by Taliban in 2001.
Temple of the Jaguar Priest (Tikal Pyramid III)	Tikal	Guatemala	180.4	55	c. 810	
BrihadiswaraTemple	Gangaikonda Cholapuram	India	180.4	55	1035	
Château de Coucy	Picardy	France	180	55	c. 1220	Height of Keep, destroyed in 1917.
Home Insurance Building	Chicago	United States	180	54.9	1891	Considered the world's first skyscraper.
Lingaraja Temple	Bhubaneshwar	India	180	54.9	c. 1090	
Varadaraja Perumal Temple	Kanchipuram	India	180	54.9	13th–16th century	
Calcutta High Court	Calcutta (now Kolkata)	India	180	54.9	1872	
Five-Story Pagoda of Tō-ji	Kyoto	Japan	180	54.8	1643	Tallest existing wooden tower in Japan.
Bombay High Court	Bombay (now Mumbai)	India	178.5	54.5	1862	
Washington Monument (Baltimore)	Baltimore	United States	178	54.4	1829	
Buland Darwaza	Fatehpur Sikri	India	177	54	1575	
Basilica and Convent of St. Francis	Salta	Argentina	177	54	1877	
Madras High Court	Madras (Now Chennai)	India	175	53.3	1892	
Saint Andrew's Church	Calcutta (now Kolkata)	India	174+	53+	1818	Height of this church was intended to be more than St John's Church, Calcutta, which in turn was 174 ft.
St John's Church	Calcutta (Now Kolkata)	India	174	53	1787	
Al-Malawiyya Minaret	Samarra	Iraq	171	53	851	
Australian Building	Melbourne	Australia	170.6	53	1890	Demolished in 1980.
Sarangapani Temple	Kumbakonam	India	173	52.7	13th–17th century	
Pyramid of Djedkare Isesi	Saqqara	Egypt	172	52.5	25th century BC	Today's structure rises only 24 metres above the ground.
Pyramid of Teti	Saqqara	Egypt	172	52.5	2340 BC~	
Pyramid of Pepi I	Saqqara	Egypt	172	52.5	24-23 century BC	
Pyramid of Merenre	Saqqara	Egypt	172	52.5	2280 BC~	
Pyramid of Pepi II	Saqqara	Egypt	172	52.4	2250 BC~	
Akbar Tomb (South Gateway)	Agra	India	172	52.4	1613	
Meenakshi Amman Temple	Madurai	India	170+	52+	16th century	
Pyramid of Nyuserre	Abusir	Egypt	171	52~	25th century BC	
Cathedral of Bogotá	Bogotá	Colombia	170	52	1823	
Dwarkadhish Temple	Dwarka	India	170	51.8	16th century	
Ananda Temple	Bagan	Myanmar	167+	51+	1105	51 metres tall without counting its hti spire.
Saint Andrew's Church	Madras (Now Chennai)	India	166.6	50.8	1818	
Huaca del Sol	Trujillo	Peru	164	50	450	
Virupaksha Temple	Hampi	India	164	50	14th century	
Htupayon Pagoda	Sagaing	Myanmar	161+	49+	1851/52	49 metres tall without counting its hti spire; originally built in 1444–1454; now raised to 61.5 m (since 2016).
Saint Joseph's Catholic Church (Mykolaiv)	Mykolaiv	Ukraine	160.7	49~	1895	
Pyramid of Userkaf	Saqqara	Egypt	161	49	2494~2345 BC	
Pont du Gard	Vers-Pont-du-Gard	France	160	48.8	40~60	Tallest roman aqueduct.
Pyramid of Senusret II	El Lahun	Egypt	159	48.65	19th century BC	
Pyramid of Sahure	Abusir	Egypt	157.5~	48~	2490 BC~	Today is 1 meter shorter and overall form was ruined.
Kalyan Minaret	Bukhara	Uzbekistan	157+	48	1127	One of the few monuments that survived Mongol conquest of Central Asia.
Colosseum	Rome	Italy	157	48	80	
Ochterlony Monument (Renamed as Shaheed Minar)	Calcutta (now Kolkata)	India	157	48	1828	
San Thome Basilica	Madras (now Chennai)	India	155	47.2	1896	
Temple of the Great Jaguar (Tikal Pyramid I)	Tikal	Guatemala	154	47	740–750	
Rajagopalaswamy Temple	Mannargudi	India	154	47	1532–1575	
Trogir Cathedral	Trogir	Croatia	154	47	c. 15th century	
Humayun Tomb	Delhi	India	154	47	1572	
Asafi Masjid	Lucknow	India	153	46.6	1784	
Laksmi Narasimha Temple	Mangalagiri - Tadepalli	India	153	46.6	1803	
Himeji Castle	Himeji	Japan	152	46.4	1618	The tallest survived castle in Japan.
Ichkabal Structure E-4	Ichkabal	Mexico	151	46	600	
Church of Saint Augustine	Goa	India	150.9	46	1602	Only side part of the tower is still standing, most part is in ruined state.
Garh Kundar (Fort)	Madhya Pradesh	India	150	45.7	1605–1627	The fort is older, last renovation is considered as the time for its tallest part.
Mahakaleshwar Temple	Ujjain	India	150	45.7	c. 1740	Height is approximate.
Narmadeshwar Mahadeo Manduk Temple	Oel Dhakwa	India	150	45.7	1870	
Old Church of Our Lady Mary of Zion	Axum	Ethiopia	147.83	45.46	c. 4th century	Destroyed by Adal Sultanate in the Ethiopian–Adal War in the 16th century.
Templo Mayor	Mexico City	Mexico	c. 150	c. 45	1325	Destroyed in 1521.
Pyramid of Ahmose	Abydos	Egypt	148	45	1525 BC~	With time was destroyed to 10 metres tall.
Mausoleum of Halicarnassus	Bodrum	Turkey	148	45	c. 350 BC	One of the Seven Wonders of the Ancient World.
Cathedral of Córdoba	Córdoba	Argentina	148	45	1787	
Zvartnots Cathedral	Zvartnots	Armenia	148	45	652	
Church of the Ascension (Piyala)	Piyala (Village)	Russia	147.6	45	1654	Tallest survived wooden church in Russia.
Sundaravarada Perumal Temple	Uthiramerur	India	145	44.2	12th–16th century	
Hassan Tower	Rabat	Morocco	144	44	1199	
Ranganathaswamy Temple; Vellai Gopuram	Srirangam	India	144	44	12th–17th century	Tallest part of the temple is Rajagopuram (73m), which started to be built around 1500 and completed in 1987.
Thanumalayan Temple (also called Sthanumalayan Temple)	Suchindram	India	144	44	17th century	
Pantheon	Rome	Italy	142	43,5	126	Pantheon has the world's largest unreinforced concrete dome.
Pyramid of Unas	Saqqara	Egypt	141	43	24th century BC	
Pyramid of the Moon	Teotihuacan	Mexico	141	43	100	
Nataraja Temple Gopuram	Chidambaram	India	140	42.7	16th century	
Iswari Minar Swarga Sal (Also called Isarlat Sargasuli)	Jaipur	India	140	42.7	1749	
Dhamek Stupa	Sarnath	India	139.8	42.6	5th / 6th century	
Saint George's Cathedral	Madras (Now Chennai)	India	139	42.4	1815	
Nohoch Mul Pyramid	Coba	Mexico	138	42	800	
Temple of the Masks (Tikal Pyramid II)	Tikal	Guatemala	138	42	c. 700	
Bahu Begum ka Maqbara	Oudh (Now Ayodhya)	India	137.8	42	1816	
Bibi ka Maqbara	Aurangabad (Now Sambhaji Nagar)	India	137	41.8	1668	
Madras Central Railway Station (Renamed as MGR Central Railway Station)	Madras (Now Chennai)	India	136	41.4	1873	
Sankara Narayanaswamy Temple	Sankarankovil	India	135	41	12th century	
Jama Masjid	Delhi	India	135	41	1656	
Prong's Lighthouse	Bombay (now Mumbai)	India	135	41	1875	
Grat Be'al Gibri	Yeha	Ethiopia	133.07	40.56	c. 750 BC	
Pyramid of the Magician	Uxmal	Mexico	131	40	560	
Mahmud Gawan Madrasa	Bidar	India	131	39.9	1472	
Tombul Mosque	Shumen	Bulgaria	130	40	1744	
El Castillo	Xunantunich	Belize	130	40	600	
St. Ignatius Church	Buenos Aires	Argentina	130	40	1722	
Christ Church	Kanpur	India	130	39.6	1840	
Senate House, Madras University	Madras (Now Chennai)	India	128	39	1879	
Pontcysyllte Aqueduct	Llangollen	Wales	127	39	1805	
Kampahareswarar Temple	Thirubuvanam	India	126	38.4	1176	
Ramanathaswamy Temple	Rameshwaram	India	126	38.4	17th century	Temple itself is much older, its tallest part, East Gopuram in its present form is from 17th century
Old Lighthouse	Madras (Now Chennai)	India	125	38.1	1843	
Cooch Behar Palace	Cooch Behar	India	125	38.1	1887	
Eastern Buddha	Bamiyan	Afghanistan	125	38	544~595	Was the tallest statue on Earth ever constructed from 544~595 to 591~644. Was destroyed by Taliban in 2001.
Kunstkamera Building	Saint Petersburg	Russia	124.6	38	1734	
Pyramid of Khendjer	Saqqara	Egypt	122.5	37.35	1760 BC~	Was destroyed with time, only 1 meter tall foundation stands this day.
Vijaya Stambha (Victory Tower)	Chittorgarh	India	122	37.2	1448	
Sher Shah Suri Tomb	Sasaram	India	122	37.2	1545	
Church of the Transfiguration	Lake Onega	Russia	121.39	37	1714	
Colossus of Nero	Rome	Italy	110	30.3~37	64~68	Was the tallest statue on Earth ever constructed from 64-68 to 544-595.
Dead Letter Office Building	Calcutta (now Kolkata)	India	120	36.6	1876	
Secunderabad Clock Tower	Secunderabad	India	120	36.6	1897	
Qila Mubarak (Fort)	Bathinda	India	118	36	c. 1200	Fort existed in 100 AD, was probably upgraded in the 12th century.
Mehrangarh Fort	Jodhpur	India	118	36	1459	
Mudhafariyya Minaret	Erbil	Iraq	118	36	1232	Higher parts of the minaret have since fallen off.
Kandariya Mahadeva Temple	Khajuraho	India	117	35.7	1030	Includes height for jagati also.
Pyramid of Ameny Qemau	Dahshur	Egypt	115	35	1790 BC~	Was destroyed with time, foundation remains to this day.
Dome of the Rock	Jerusalem	Israel	114.8~ (Height of the temple itself); 275.6~ (Height including artificial part of Temple Mount)	35~ (Height of the temple itself); 84~ (Height including artificial part of Temple Mount)	692	Was build on top of artificial Temple Mount, which was part of Temple in Jerusalem.
Se Cathedral	Goa	India	115	35	1619	
Bir Singh Deo Palace	Datia	India	115	35	1620	
Rochester Castle	Rochester	United Kingdom	113	34	1127	Height of Keep.
Kilmacduagh monastery	County Galway	Ireland	113	34	10th century	Height of Round Tower, Tallest surviving Irish round tower.
Minaret of al-Khulafa Mosque	Baghdad	Iraq	112	34	908	Oldest surviving building in Baghdad.
Sidi Bashir Mosque	Ahmedabad	India	111.5	34	1452	
Victoria Public Hall	Madras (Now Chennai)	India	111.5	34	1890	
Great Pyramid of La Venta	La Venta	Mexico	110	34	c. 900 BC	
Stockport Viaduct	Stockport	United Kingdom	111.1	33.9	1840	
Colossus of Rhodes	Rhodes	Greece	110	33.5	c. 280 BC	One of the Seven Wonders of the Ancient World. It fell after standing for 56 years and then collapsed in an earthquake. Was the tallest statue on Earth ever constructed from 280 BC to 64-68 AD.
Church of St Anne	Goa	India	110	33.5	1695	
High Temple	Lamanai	Belize	108.27	33	400–100 BC	
Great Stelae	Axum	Ethiopia	108.27	33	c. 4th century	Collapsed shortly after construction.
Red Fort	Delhi	India	108.27	33	1648	
Kailash Temple	Ellora	India	107	32.6	756–773	World's largest sculpted monolithic building.
Five-Story Pagoda of Horyuji-Temple	Ikaruga	Japan	107	32.55	670–711	Oldest wooden tower in the world.
Shuja-Ud-Daula Tomb, Gulab Bari	Oudh (Now Ayodhya)	India	106.6	32.5	1753–1775	
Kesariya Stupa	Kesariya	India	104	32	~8th / 9th century	
Sivasagar Sivadol	Sivasagar	India	104	32	1734	
Temple of Venus and Roma	Rome	Italy	102	31~	135	One of the largest ancient roman temples, today only ruins remain.
Ranakpur Jain Temple	Ranakpur	India	102	31	1439	
Dakshineswar Kali Temple	Calcutta (now Kolkata)	India	100+	30+	1855	
Temple of Hatshepsut	Qurnah District	Egypt	97	30	15th century BC~	
Botevgrad Clock Tower	Botevgrad	Bulgaria	100	30	1866	
Chand Baori (Stepwell)	Abhaneri	India	100	30	900	The figure is for depth below ground level. From bottom, total height shall include superstructure above ground also.
Kakanmath Temple	Sihoniya, MP	India	100	30	1015–1035	
City Palace	Udaipur	India	100	30	16–17th century	
Ghata Masjid (Also called Zeenat-Ul-Masajid)	Delhi	India	100	30	1707	
Padmanabhaswamy Temple	Thiruvananthapuram	India	100	30	1729–1758	
Didyma	Didim	Turkey	82~91.8	25~28	8th century BC~	One of the largest ancient greek temples, today only ruins remain.
Minaret of Anah	Anah	Iraq	92	28	996-1096	Reconstructed several times due to bombings caused by terrorists in the 21st century.
Uzgen Minaret	Özgön	Kyrgyzstan	90	27.5	11th century	
Tower of London	London	England	89	27	1078	
White Mosque of Ramle	Ramle	Israel	89	27	1190	Built on top of an older mosque commissioned by Umar ibn Abd al-Aziz, the building was destroyed by several earthquakes. Today only the minaret has survived.
Obelisk of Axum	Axum	Ethiopia	78	24	c. 4th century	Taken to Italy as a spoil of war in 1937. Reinstalled in 2008.
Pyramid of Ibi	Saqqara	Egypt	69~	21~	2167 BC~	
Great Sphinx of Giza	Giza	Egypt	66	20	26th century BC~	Was the tallest statue on Earth ever constructed from 26th century BC to 280 BC.
Parthenon	Athens	Greece	59~62.3	18~19	432 BC	Today stands only 13.72 metres high.
Colossi of Memnon	Luxor	Egypt	60	18	1350 BC	Two separate statues.
Layer Pyramid	Zawyet El Aryan	Egypt	56 or 138–148~	17 or 42~45	2630 BC~	It is unknown if pyramid was ever finished, if so, it could be 42-45 metres high.
Tomb of Askia	Gao	Mali	55	17	1495	
Göbekli Tepe	Şanlıurfa Province	Turkey	49.21	15	9500 BCE~8000 BCE	Was likely tallest structure on Earth when it was built.
Broch of Mousa	Mousa, Shetland	Scotland	44	13.3	300 BC~	Tallest survived Broch to this day.
Newgrange	County Meath	Ireland	43	13	3100 BC~	
Pyramid of Nubkheperre Intef	Dra' Abu el-Naga	Egypt	43~	13~	16th century BC	Was destroyed with time, foundation remains to this day.
Tower of Jericho	Jericho	Palestine	27.9	8.5	8000 BC~	Was possibly tallest structure on Earth when it was built.
Buried Pyramid	Saqqara	Egypt	26	8	2645 BC~	Theoretically originally was planned to be built up to 70 metres tall.
Stonehenge	Wiltshire	England	22.96	7.5	1600 BC~	

== See also ==
- History of the world's tallest buildings
- List of tallest buildings and structures
