= Onze Lieve Vrouwetoren =

Late gothic church tower in Amersfoort

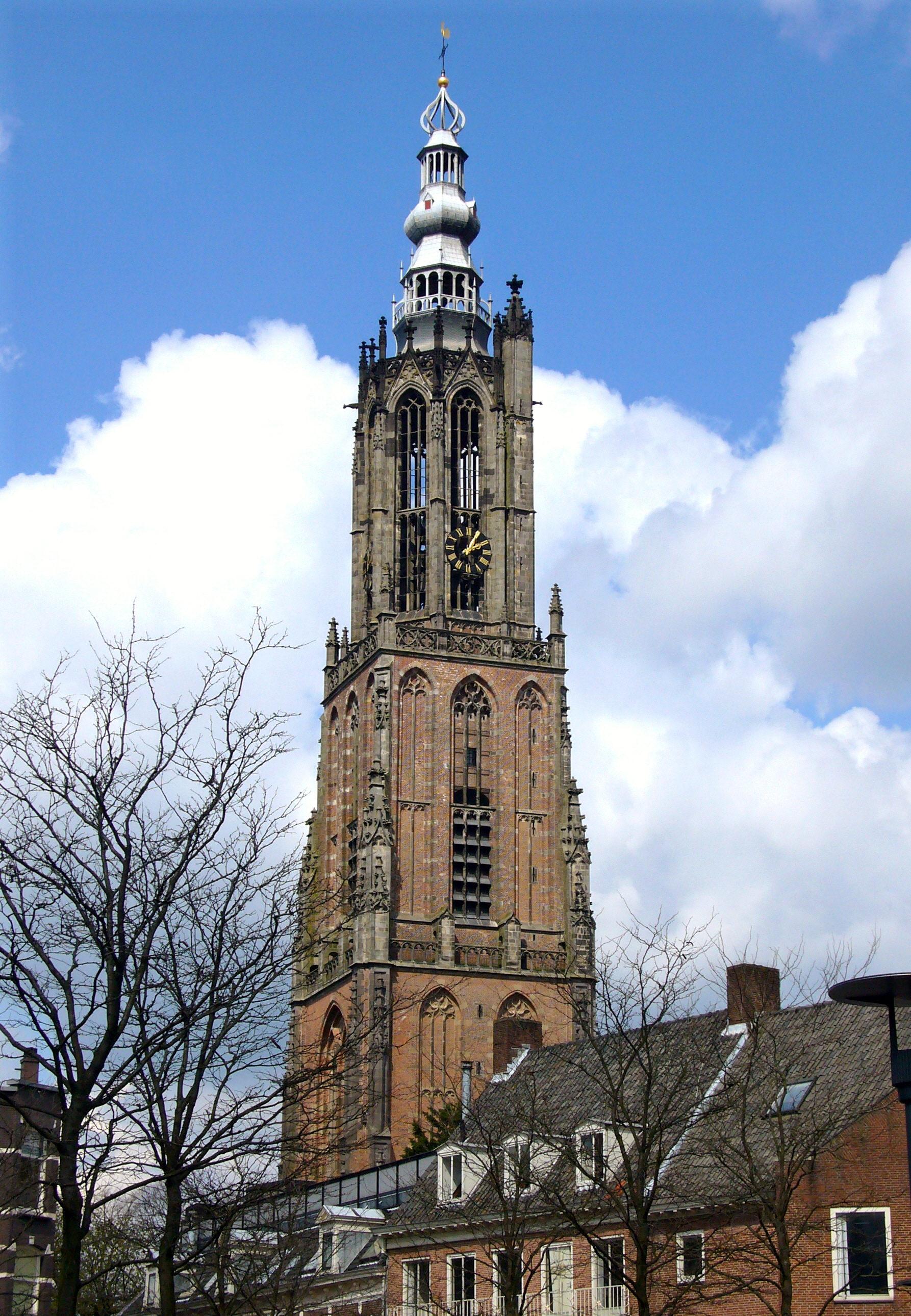
- Onze Lieve Vrouwetoren

Location
- Location: Amersfoort, Netherlands
- Interactive map of Onze Lieve Vrouwetoren
- Coordinates: 52.155223°N 5.387242°E

Architecture
- Type: Church tower
- Style: Gothic
- Groundbreaking: 1444
- Completed: 1470
- Height (max): 98.33 m (322.60 ft)
- Designated as NHL: Dutch rijksmonument #7940

The Onze-Lieve-Vrouwetoren (Dutch pronunciation: [ˌɔnzə ˌlivə ˈvrʌu.əˌtoːrə(n)]; "Tower of Our Lady"), nicknamed Lange Jan ("Long John"), is a church tower in Amersfoort. The Late Gothic building is 98.33 metres (322 ft 7 in) tall and reaches high above the inner city. It is one of the most eye-catching monuments in town and the third highest church tower in the Netherlands. The church that belonged to the tower was destroyed by a gunpowder explosion in the 18th century.

== History ==
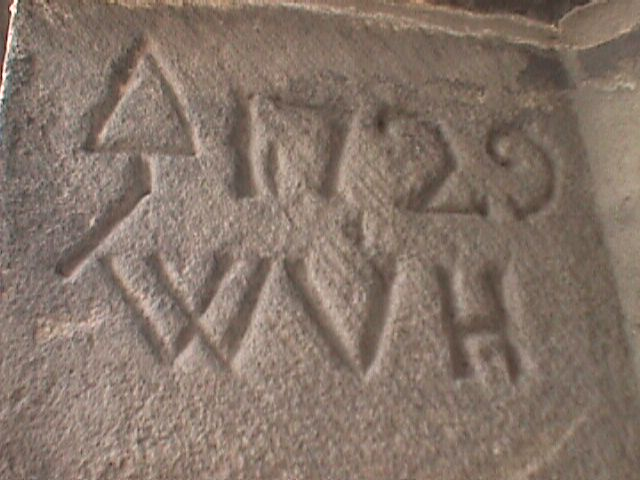
A signature in the tower, left by a builder in 1729.

The first chapel on site was constructed on this site in the 14th century. In the 15th century the chapel was replaced by new church with three aisles. When the tower was built is not exactly known. Construction started around 1444 and was finished around 1470. The official documents of the construction were destroyed by the Protestants in 1579 during the reformation and the ensuing iconoclasm. The church and tower were taken over by the Protestants and no longer belonged to the Catholics.

The church also has been used for other purposes than worshiping. It was used as a storage place for ammunition and as laboratory for the manufacturing of shells.

In 1986 some research was done into its history and in the current square one can see the original plan of the church. The spire of the church burned down in 1651 and again in 1804. The tower was restored in 1912–1932, in 1965–1970 and in 1993–1996.

== Dutch grid reference system ==
The middle point of the Dutch grid reference system is situated in the tower. From origin the tower spin was the middle of the grid with x = 0 and y = 0. This grid system was set up in the period 1885-1904. The coördinates were also called Amersfoort coördinates. The Zero-point was moved in the period 1960-1978, it moved 155 km Westwards and 463 km Southwards (120 km Southeast of Paris, 1 km East of La Celle-Saint-Cyr). The coördinates of the middle point since then are X = 155 000, Y = 463 000. Advantage of this new Zero-point is that there are no negative coördinates anymore and the X values differ from the Y values so mistakes shall not occur anymore.

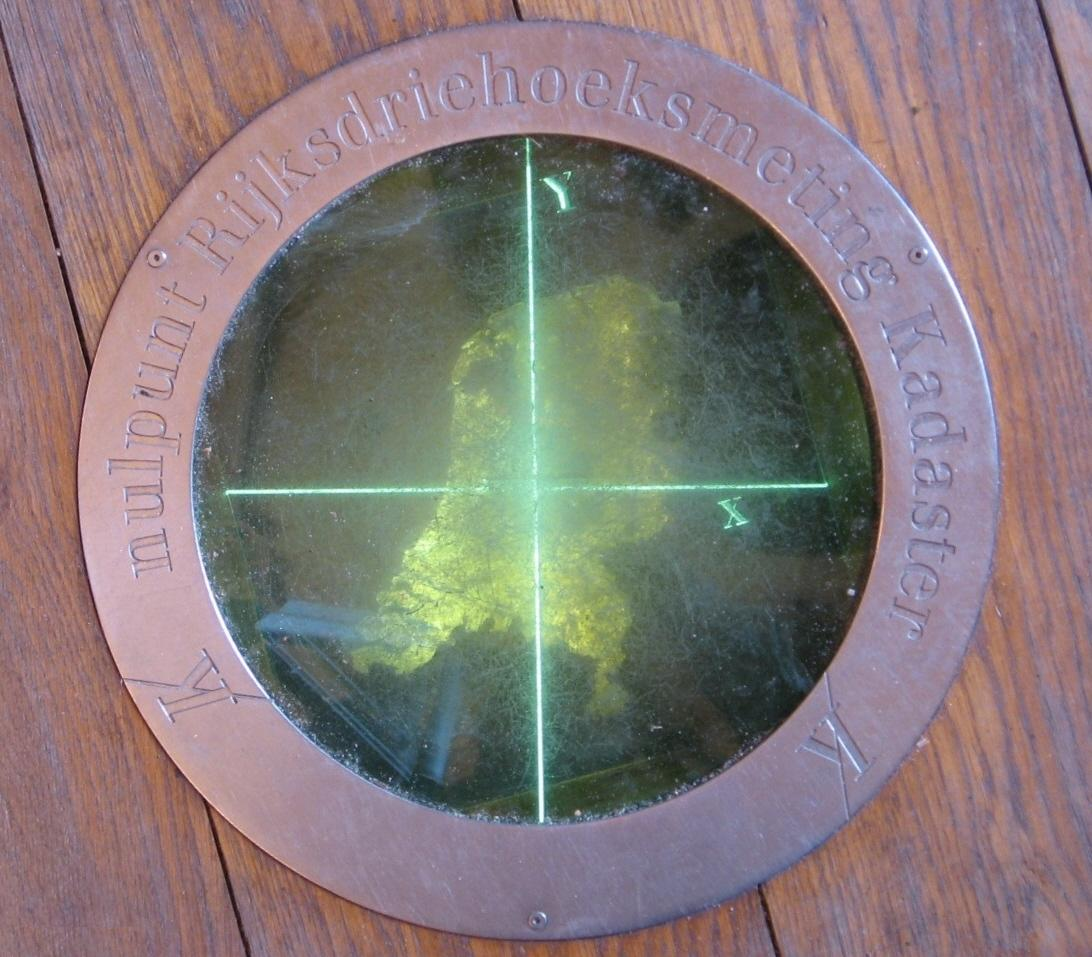
Middle-point of the Dutch grid system.

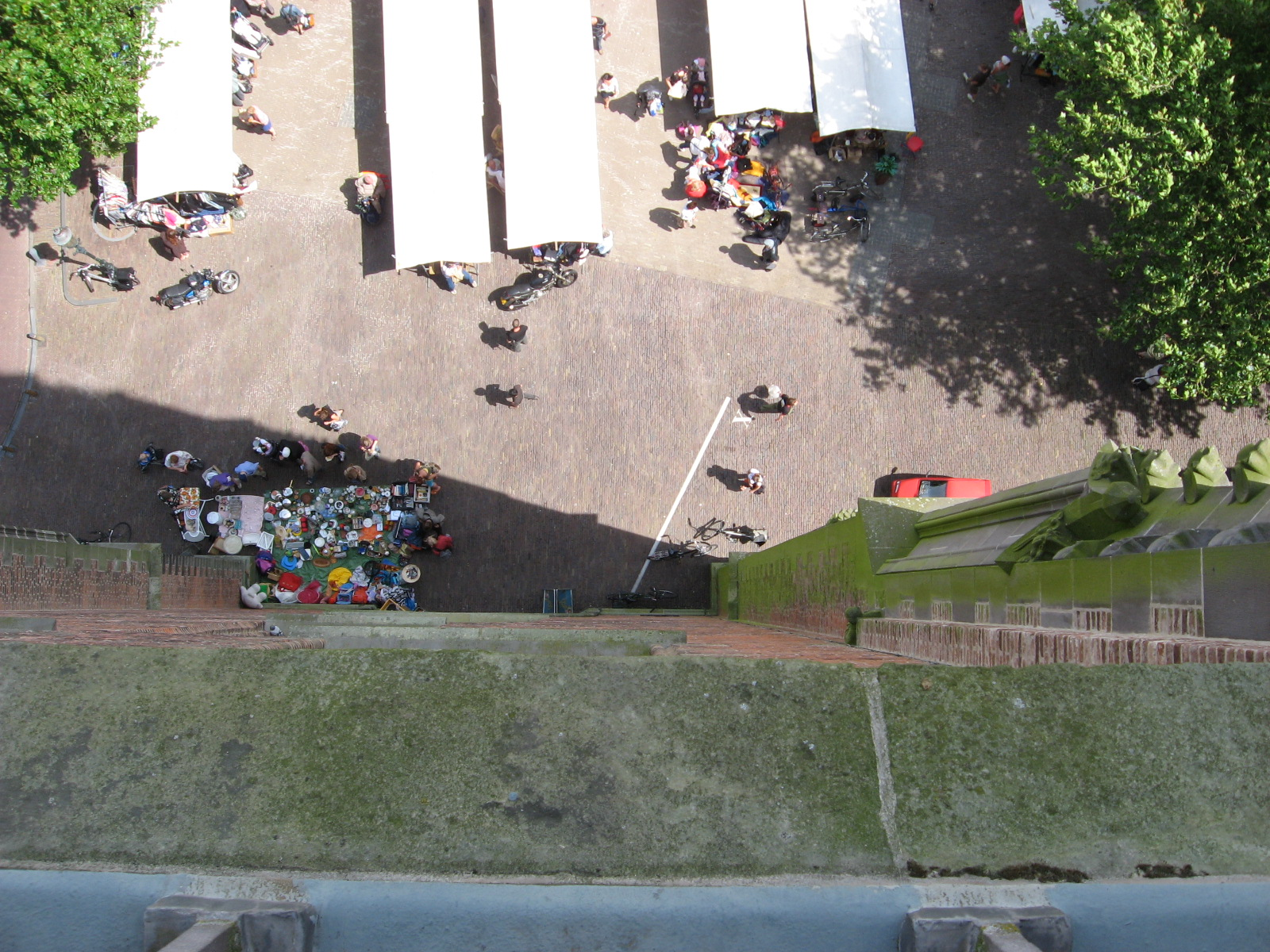
Metal stripe indicating the X-axis of the coördinate system

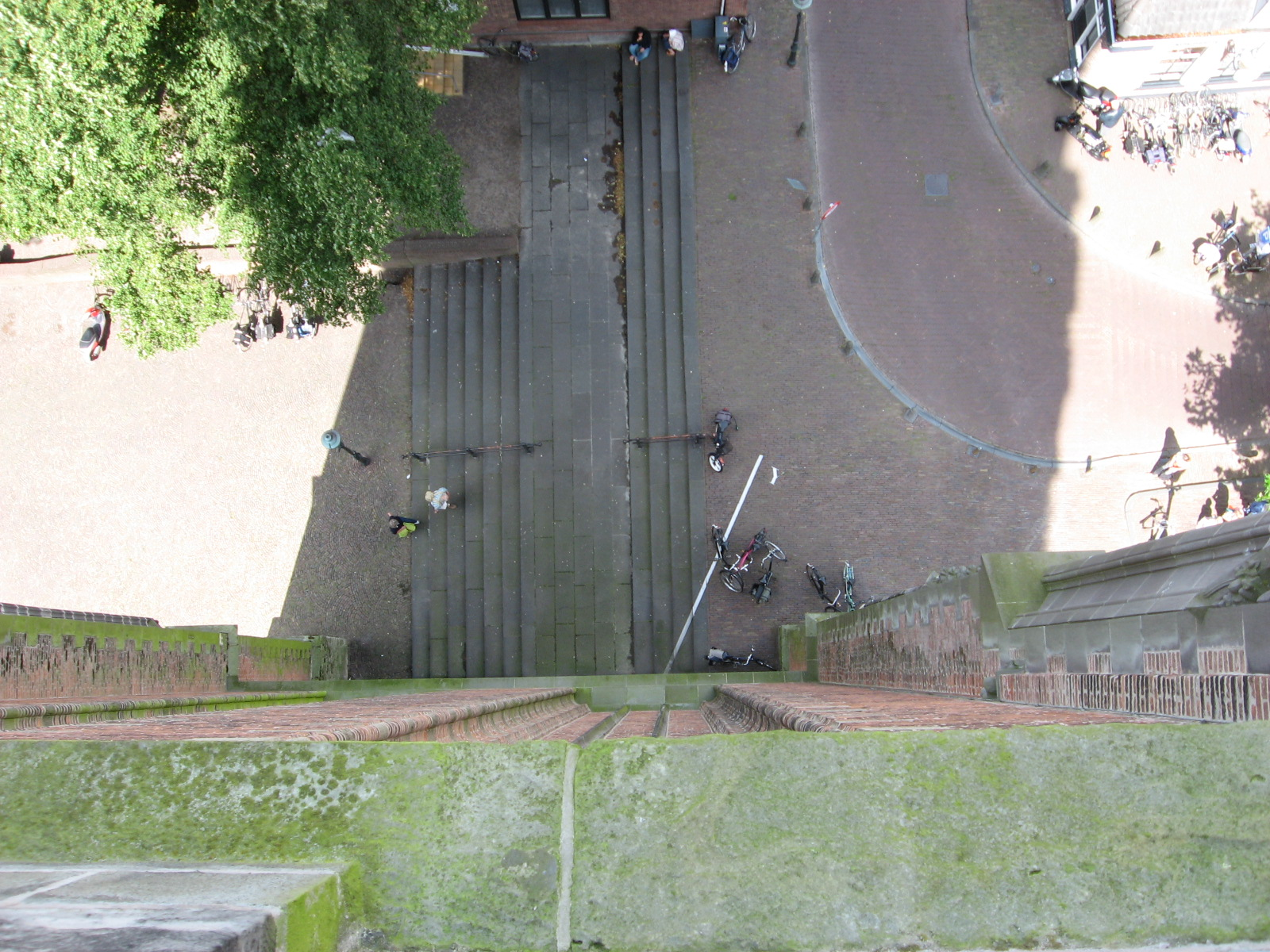
Metal stripe indicating the Y-axis of the coördinate system

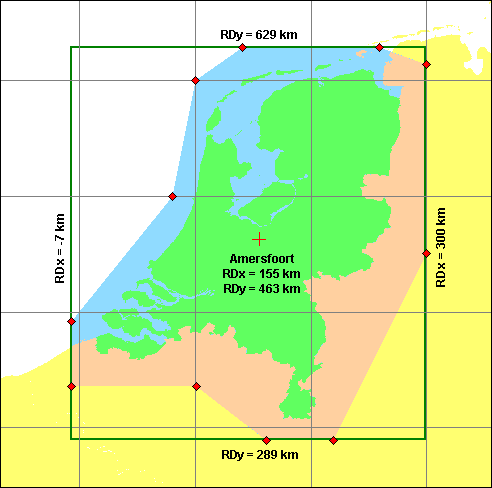
Area of use for Dutch Geodetic Rijksdriehoeksstelsel

== Consoles on the tower ==
There are twelve consoles on the tower. The new consoles are designed and made by Ton Mooy during the restoration of 1993-1996. They replaced the weathered consoles from around 1930. The new consoles are made from Volvic basaltlava instead of the previous used Tuff stone, for reasons of durability and weather resistance. The basalt lava also mimics the surrounding Bentheimer sandstone in colouring, which could not be used anymore due to health regulations, and is suited for finer carving than tuff stone.

Extra information about the persons depicted on the consoles:

- Hendrik van Vianden was the Bishop of Utrecht who granted Amersfoort city rights in 1259
- Margriete Gijsen found the miraculous Maria statue in the water of the canal near the Kamperpoort in 1444
- David of Burgundy was the Bishop of Utrecht when the Onze Lieve Vrouwetoren was built
- Leendert Nicasius was the city carpenter, who saved the Onze Lieve Vrouwetoren from destruction in 1651 after it was struck by lightning
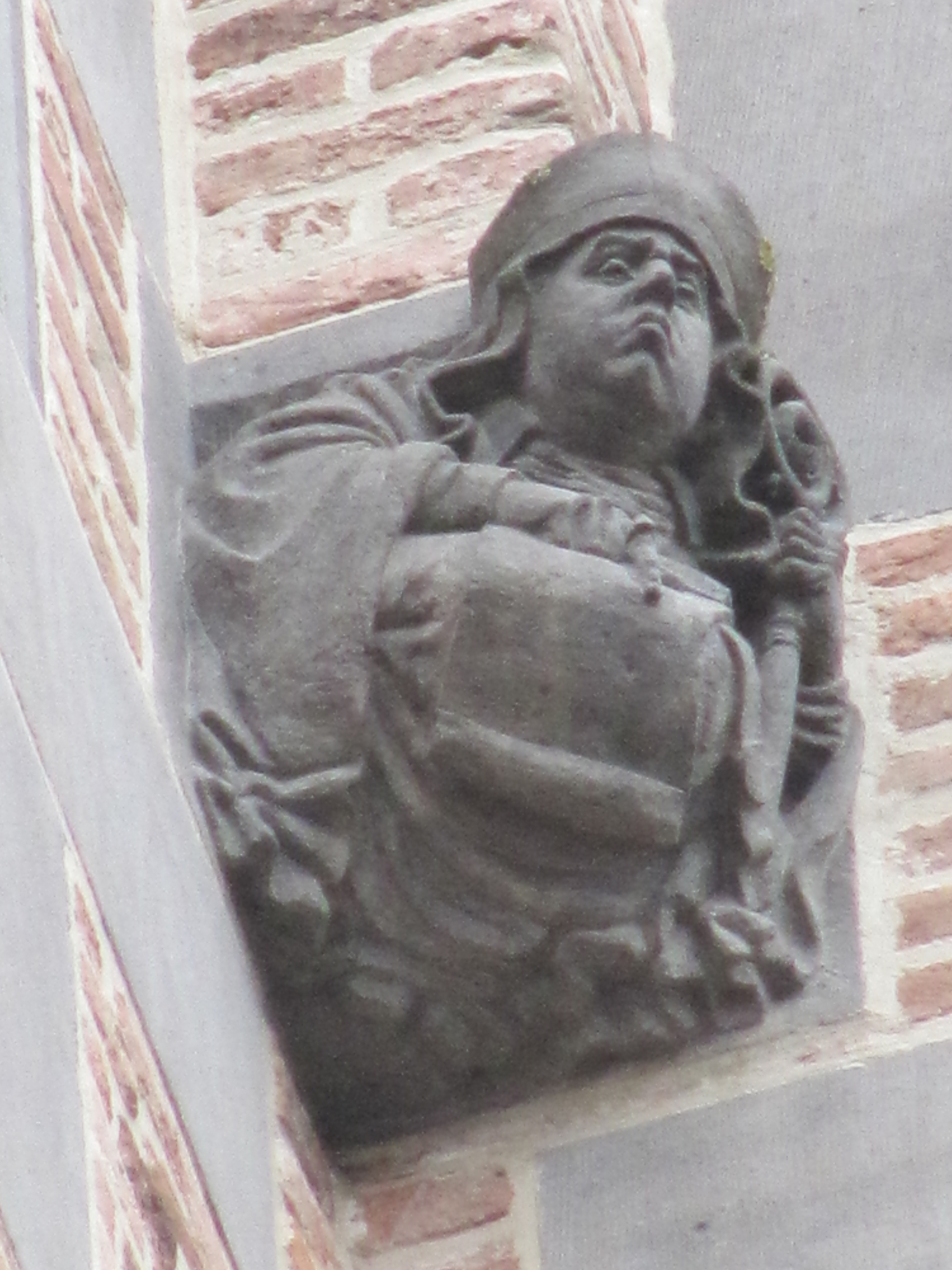
Hendrik of Vianden

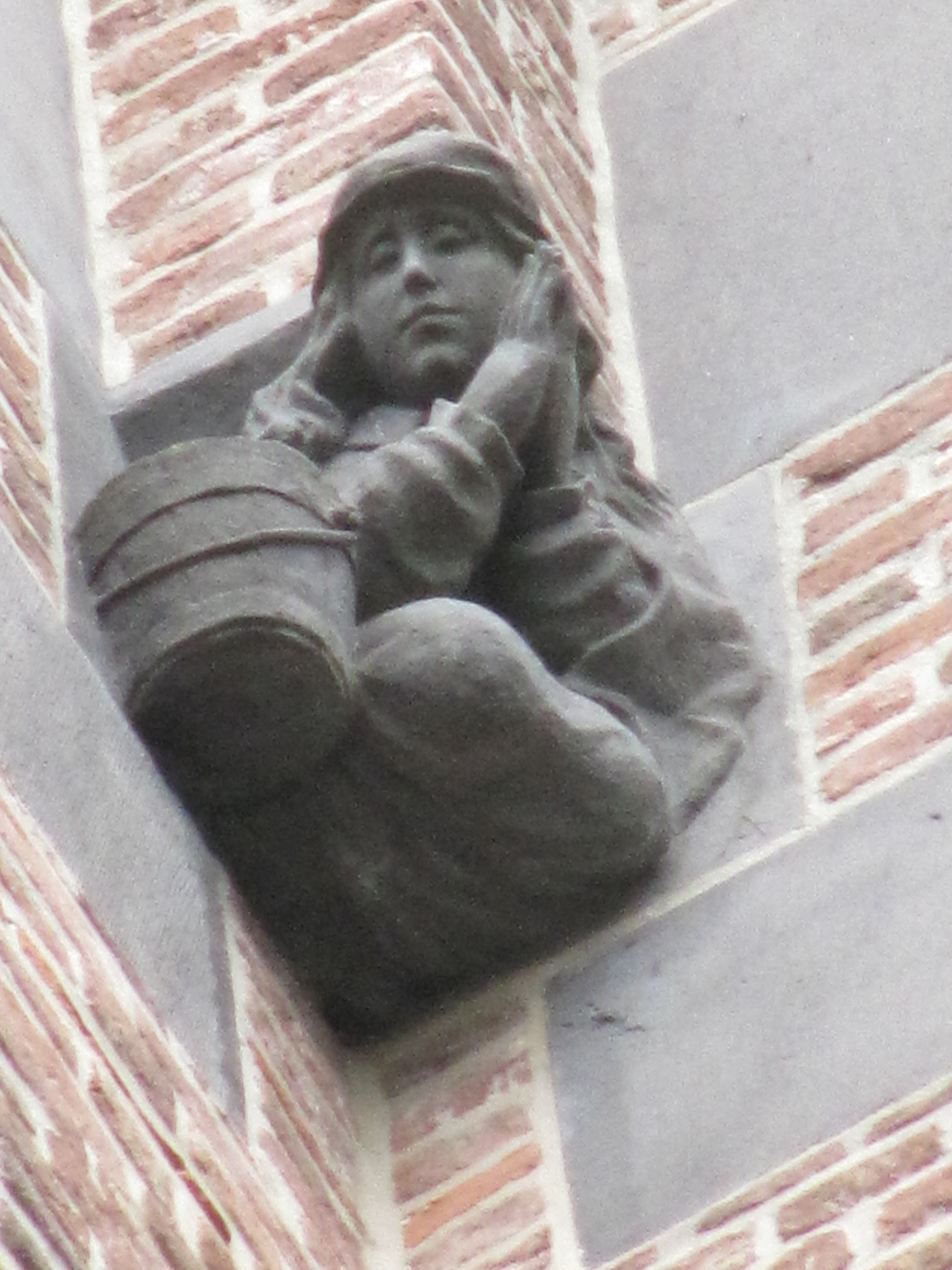
Margriete Gijsen

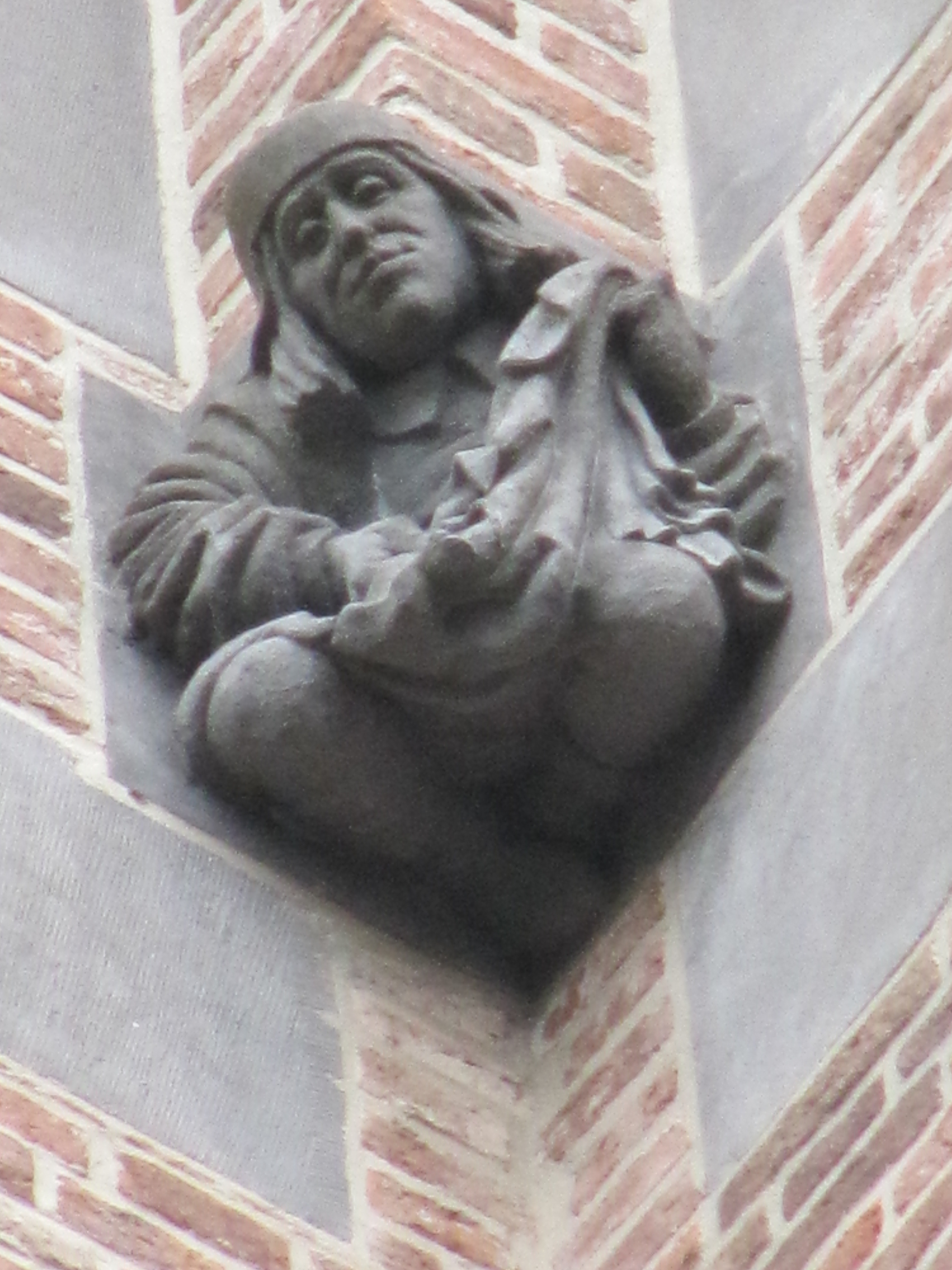
Weaver

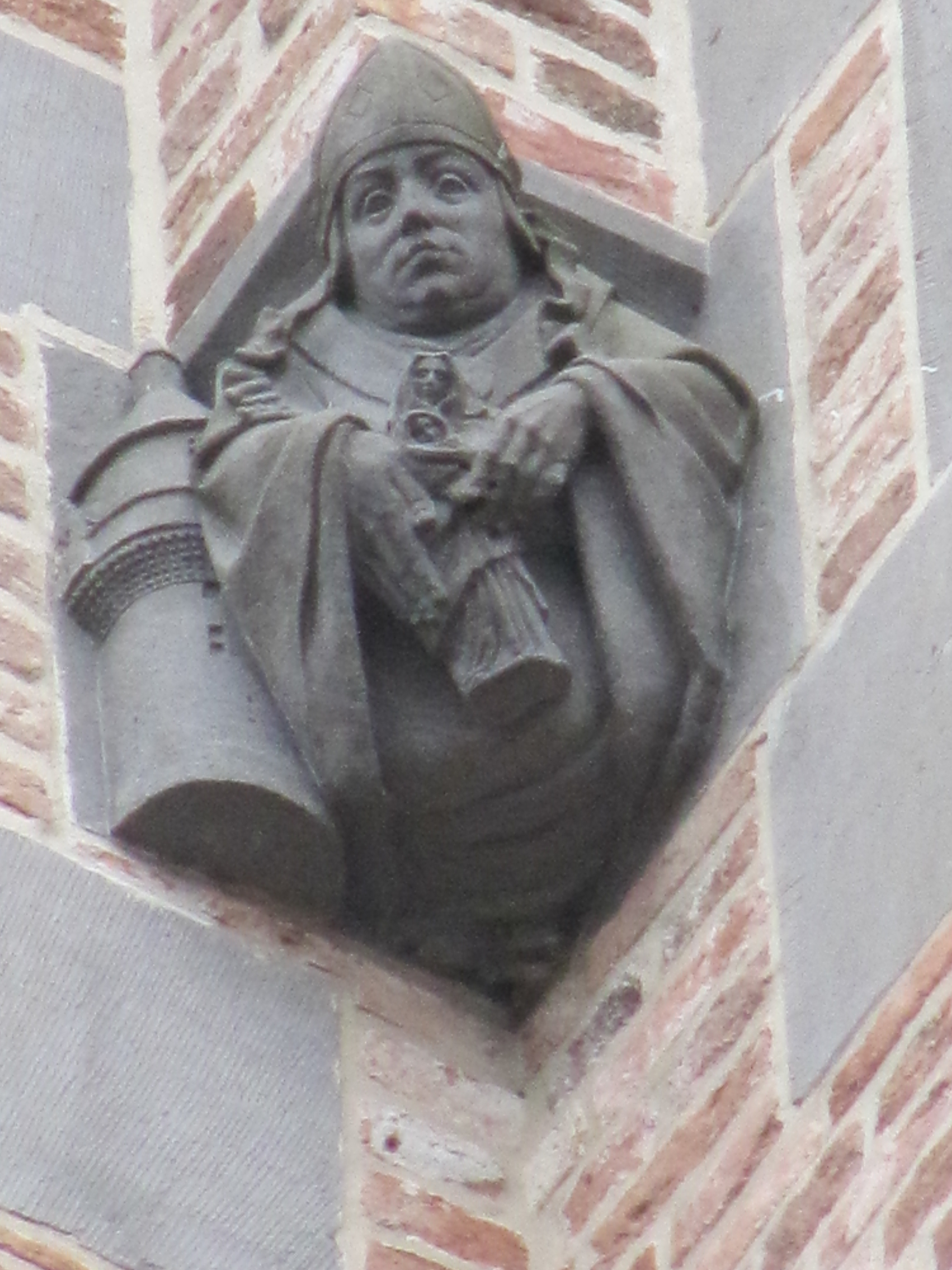
David of Burgundy

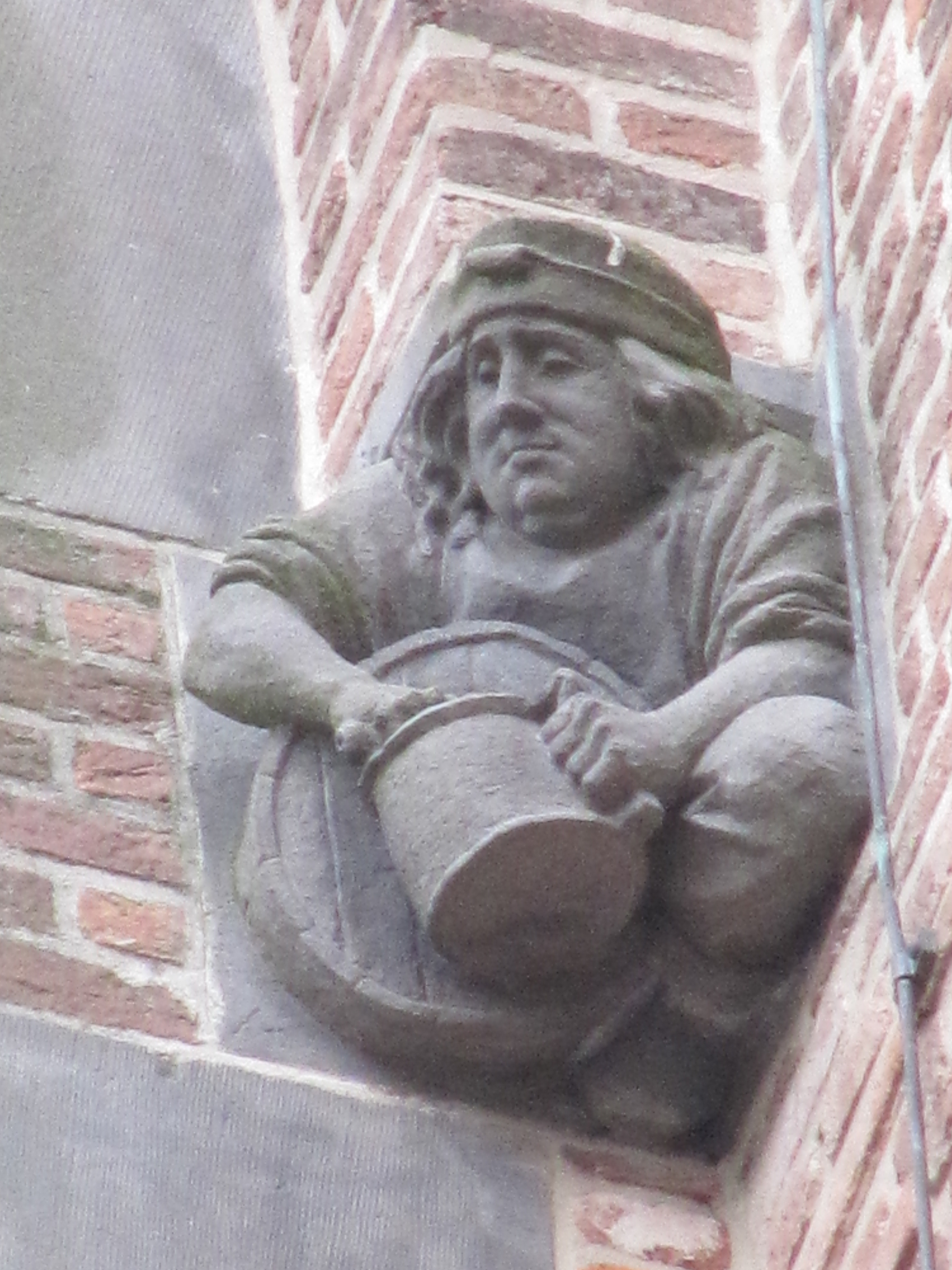
Brewer

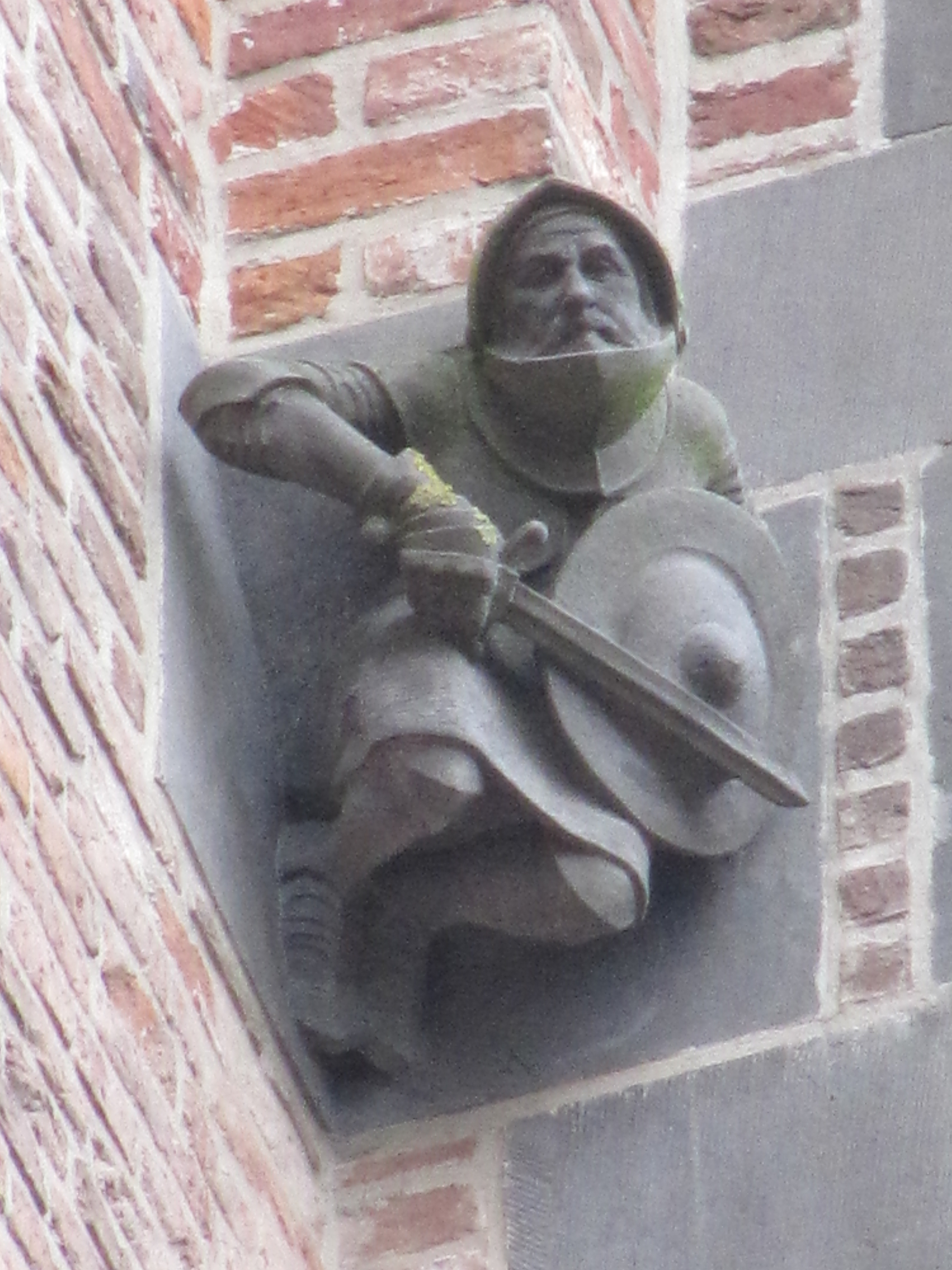
Lord of Amersfoort

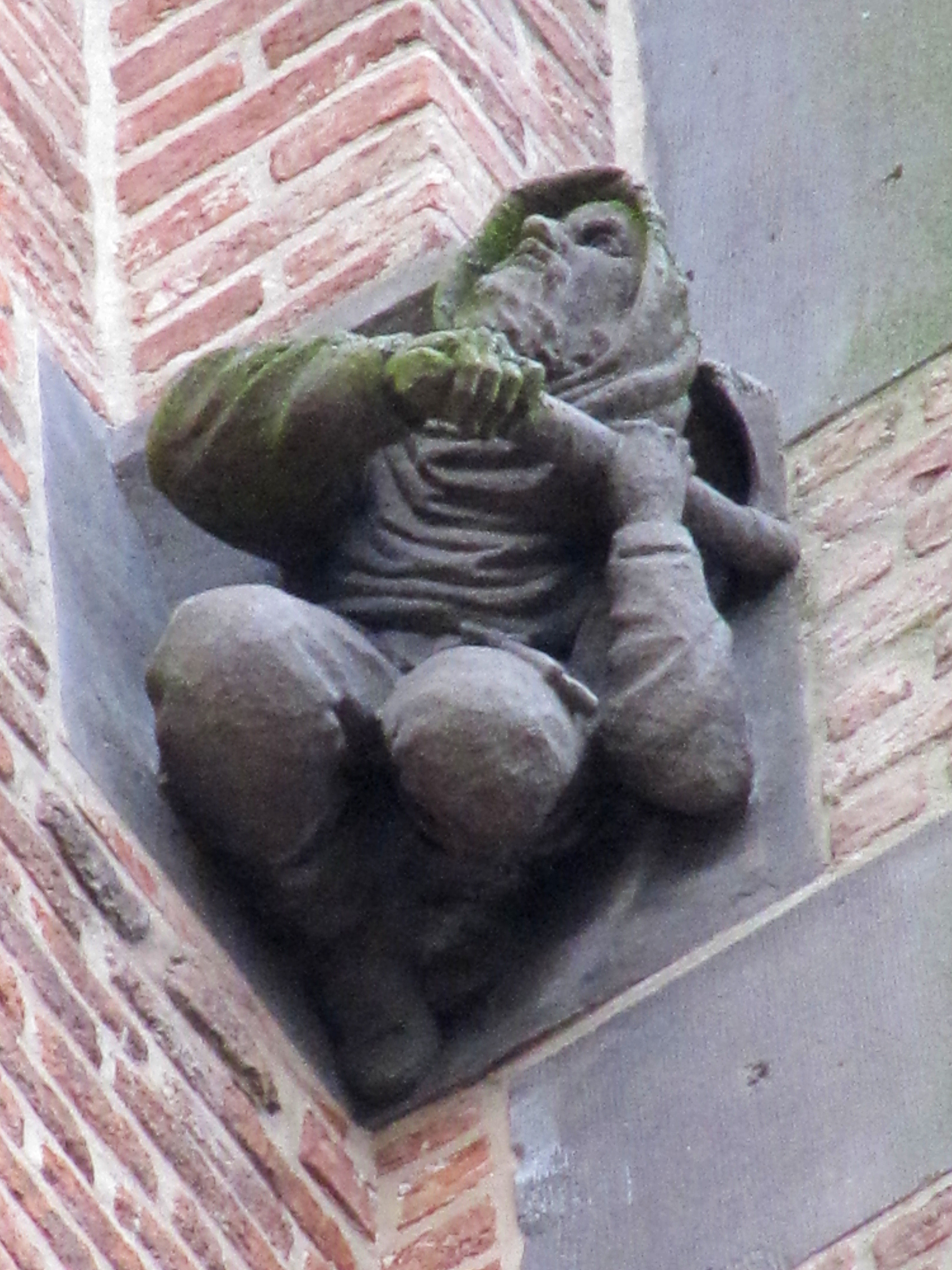
Leendert Nicasius

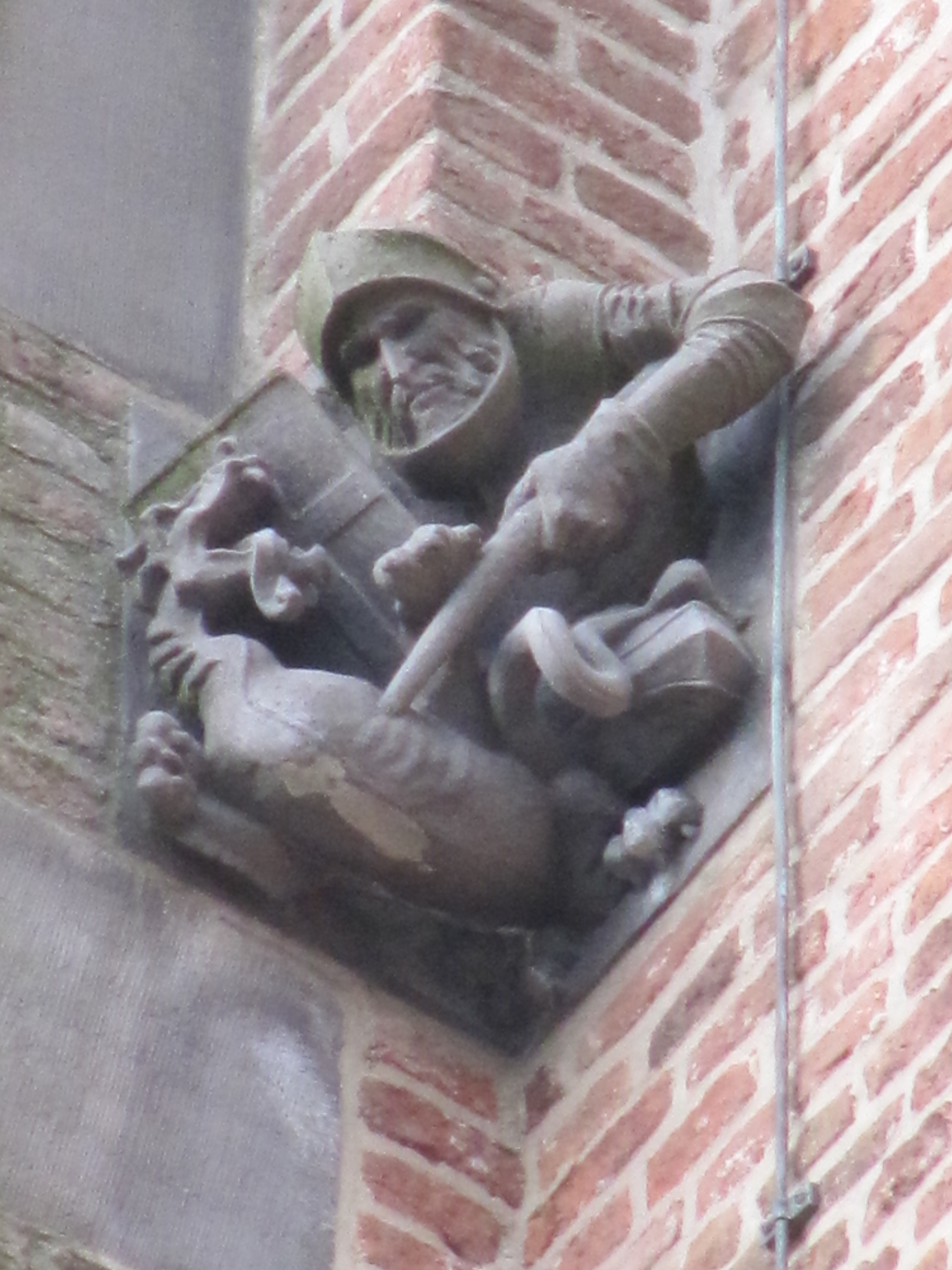
Saint George killing the dragon

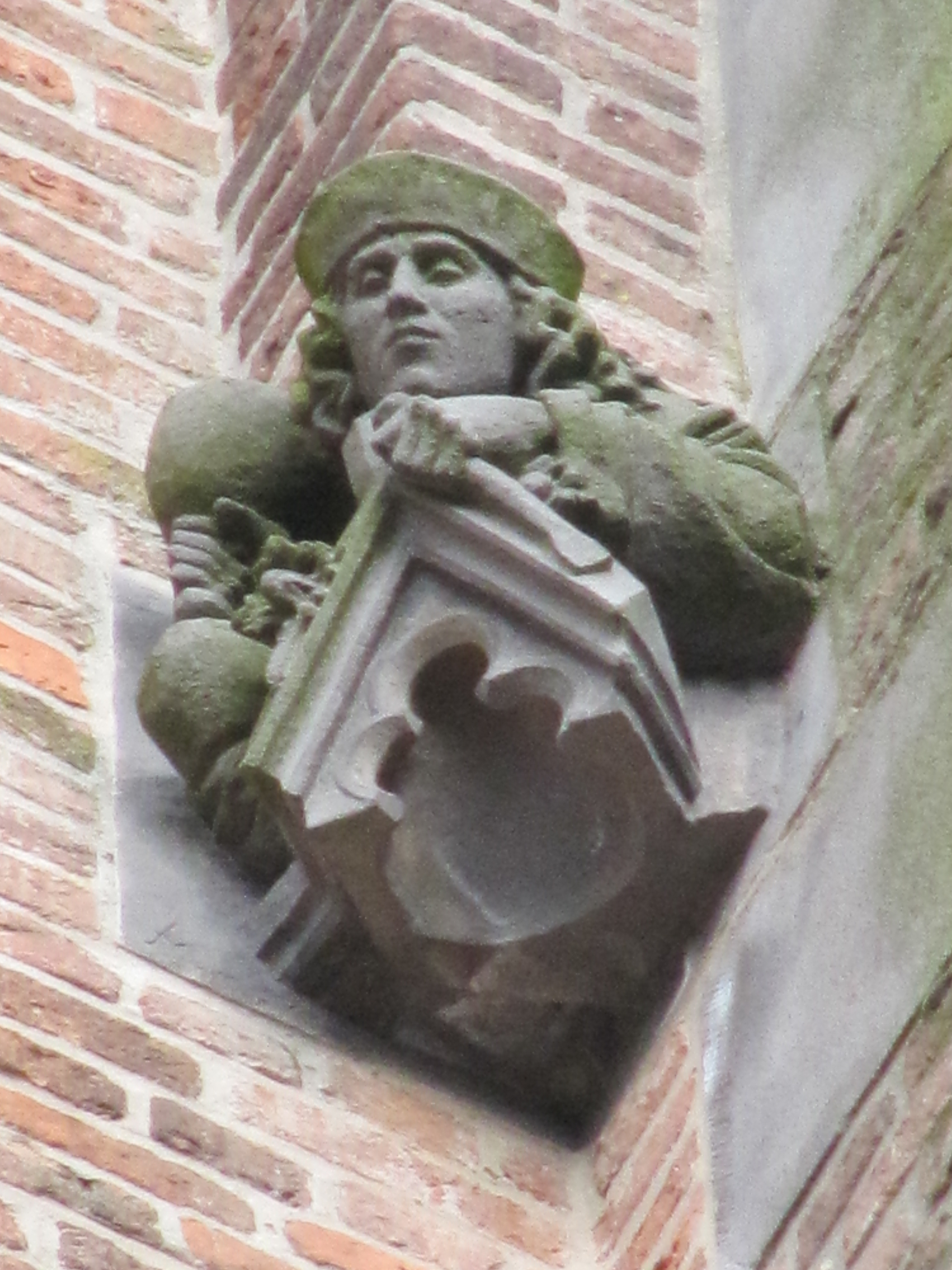
Stonecutter

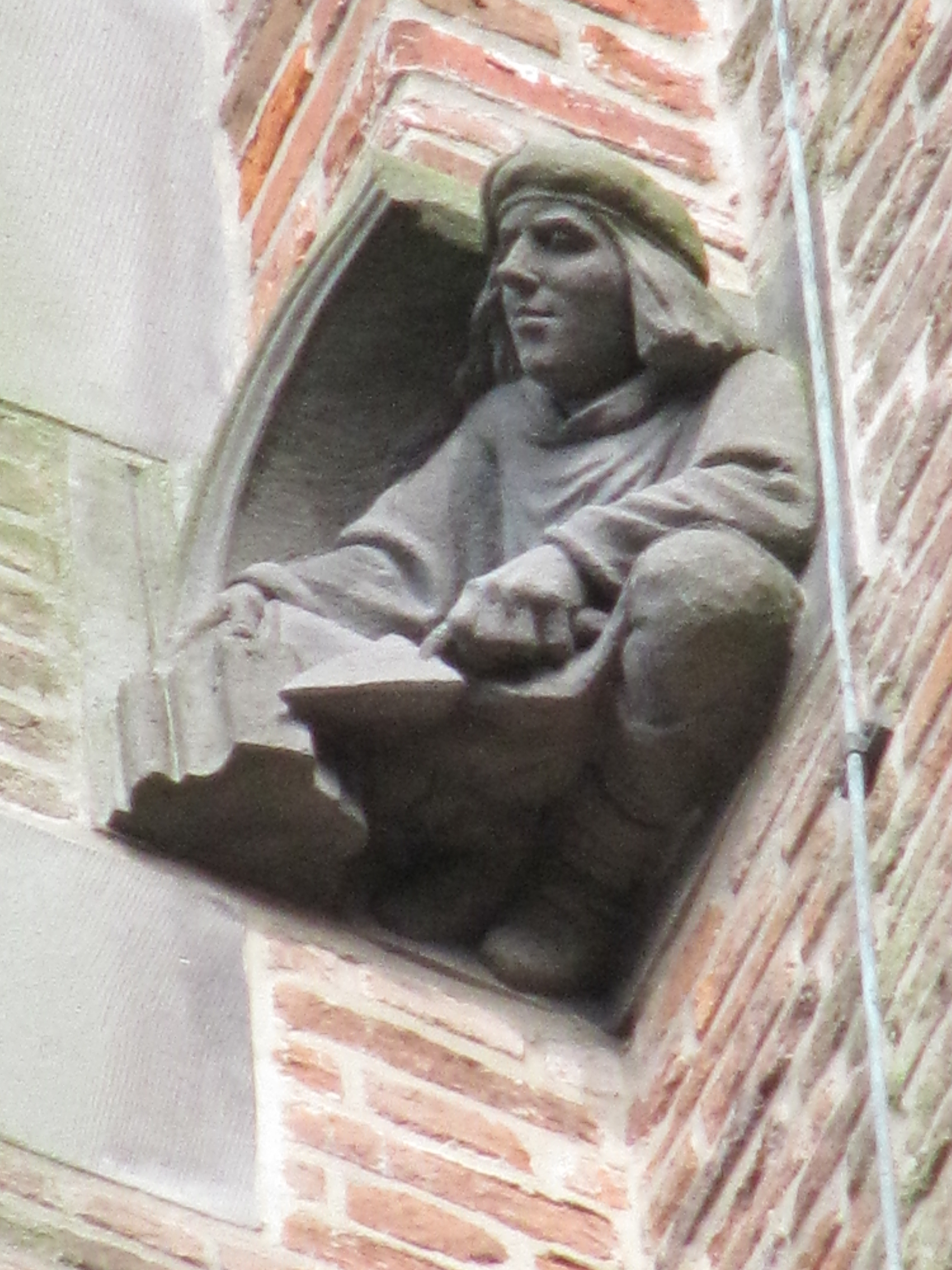
Bricklayer

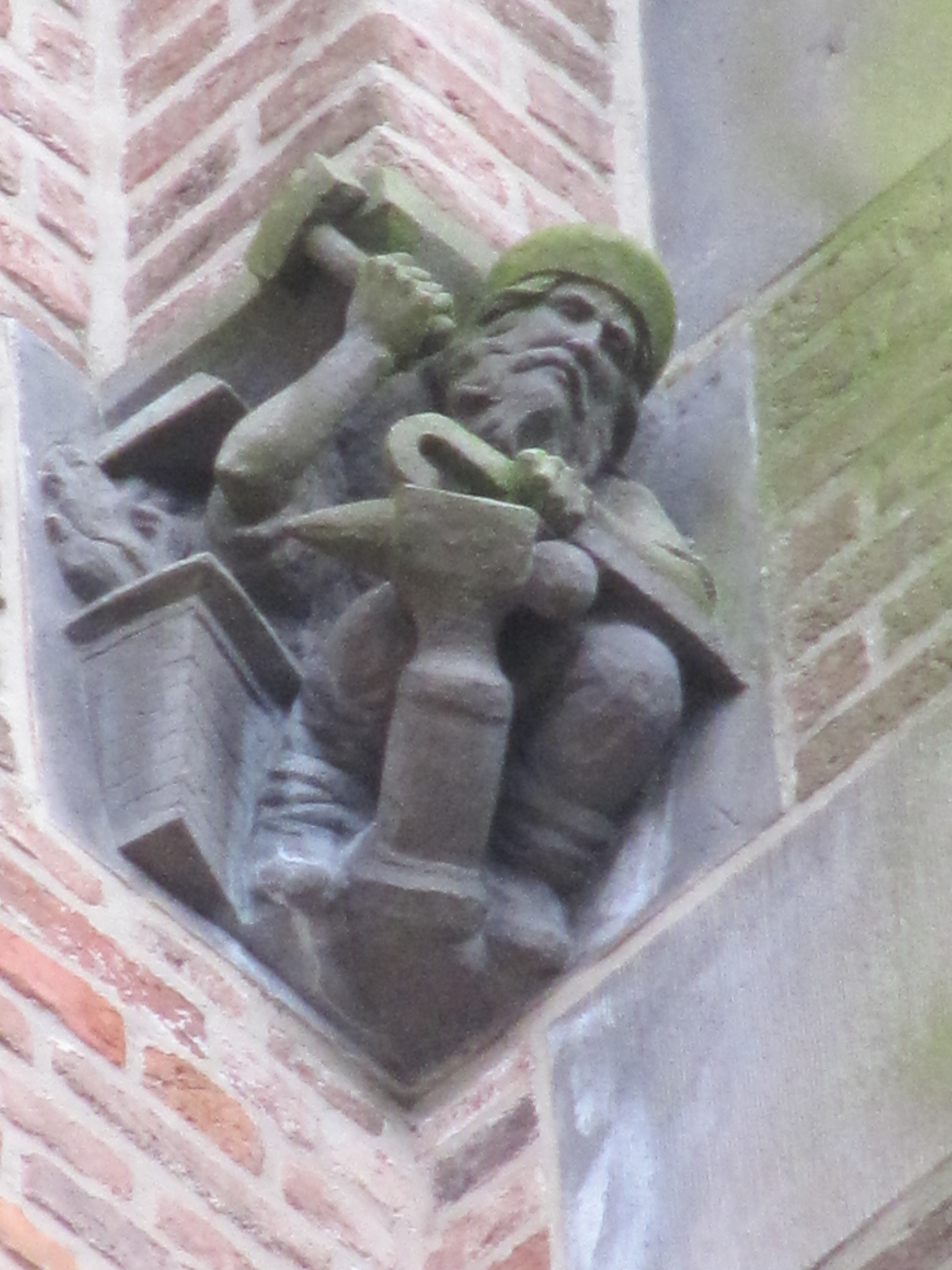
Blacksmith

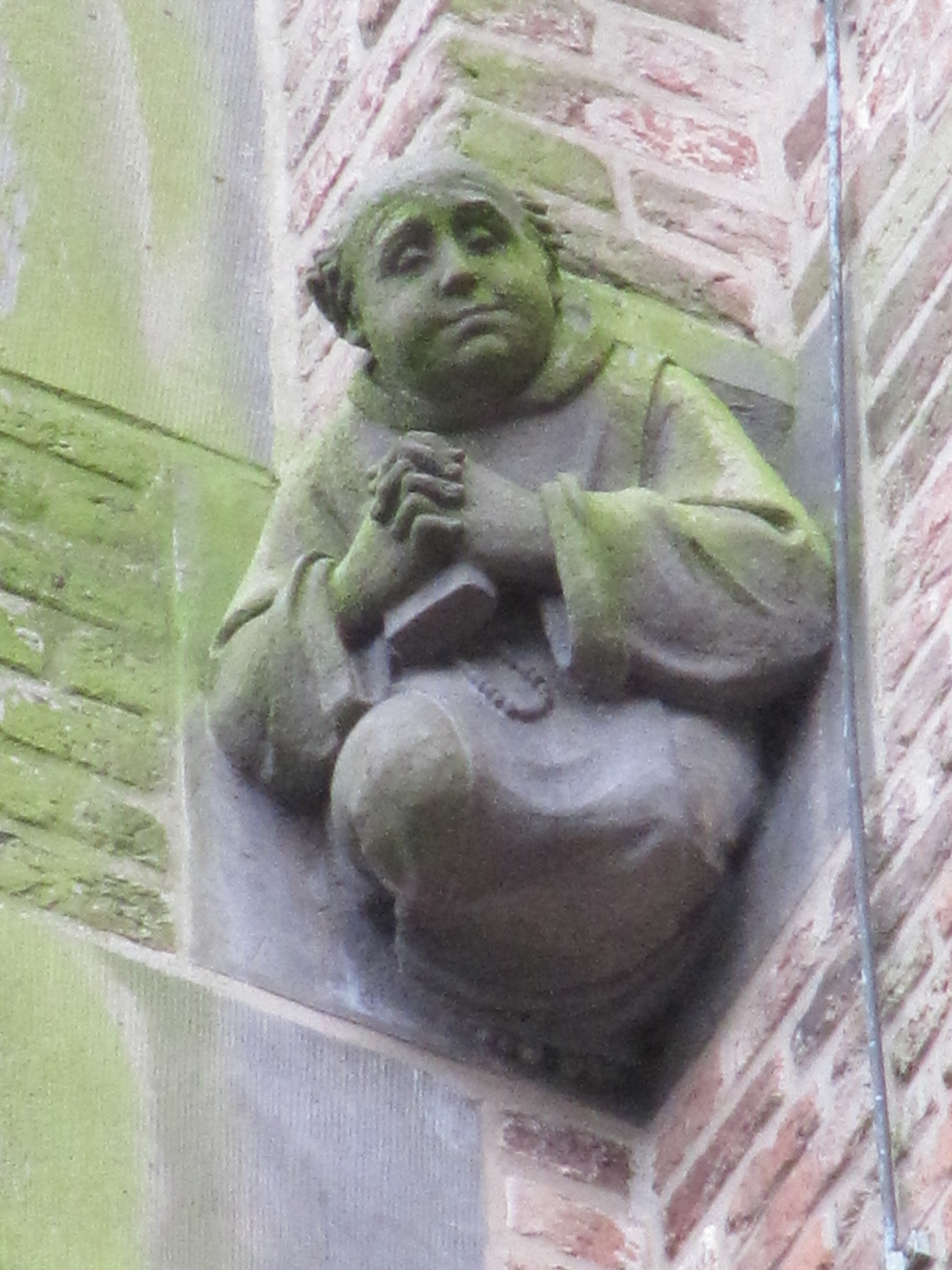
Monk

== See also ==
- List of tallest structures built before the 20th century
