= Yongning Pagoda =

Historical temple in Luoyang, China

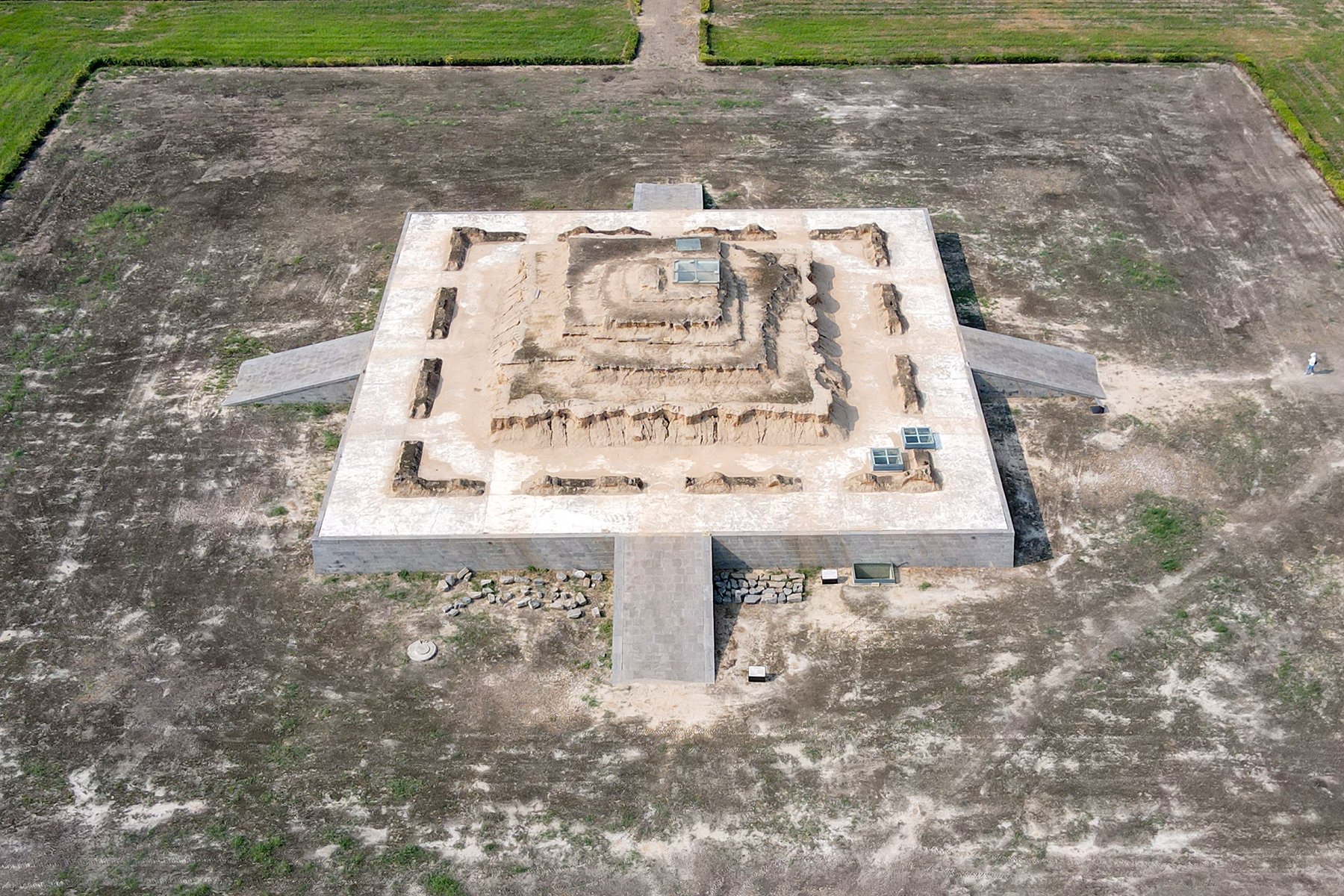
Site of the Yongning Pagoda in Luoyang

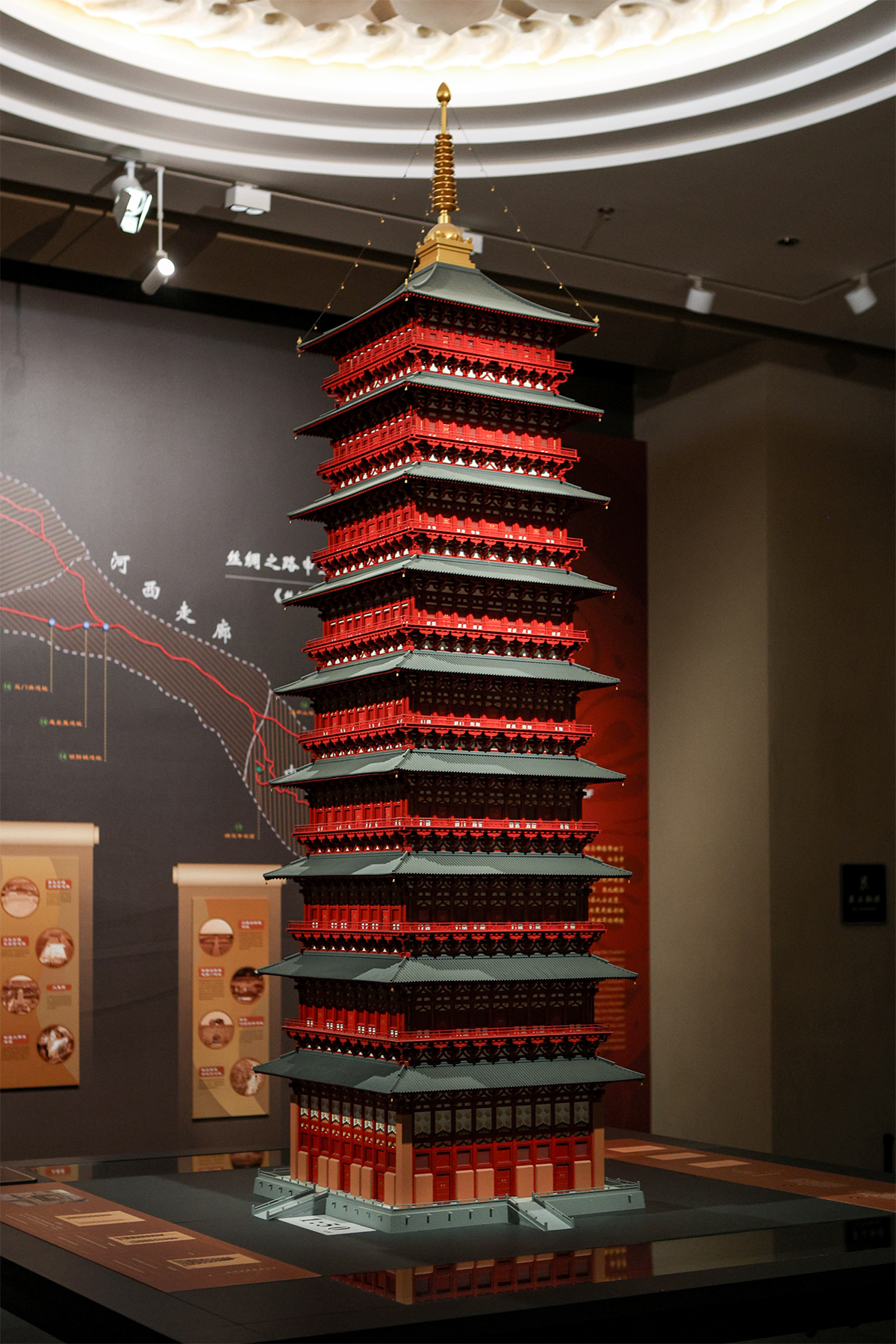
Hypothetical model reconstruction of Yongning Pagoda at Han-Wei Luoyang Ancient City Site Museum

The Yongning Pagoda or Yongning Temple (simplified Chinese: 永宁寺; traditional Chinese: 永寧寺; pinyin: Yǒngníng Sì) in Luoyang was one of the tallest buildings of the world from 516 AD to 534 AD. The timber-frame pagoda with a complete column grid and a stabilising masonry-core was built during the Northern Wei in 516 AD, but is no longer extant. Possibly nine stories high, of which seven were made of earth platforms with wooden verandas, and the top two stories being completely out of wood. One source states that it was 90 zhang (about 240 m (790 ft)) high, plus a 10 zhang high pinnacle, which is thought to be an exaggeration. More reliable sources suggest that it may have been 40 zhang (about 100 m (330 ft)) or 49 zhang high, including the pinnacle having possibly had a top height of 137, 147, or with a pinnacle of extra 7 zhang even 154.95 m (508.4 ft), making it the tallest building in the world at that time and the tallest pagoda ever built until the completion of the Tianning Temple (Changzhou) in 2007. According to evidence unearthed by modern archaeological excavation, the pagoda had a square foundation of rammed earth with a width of 38.2 m (125 ft). The earthen foundation was covered by a 2.2 m (7.2 ft) thick layer of limestone bricks. Pillar bases have been discovered at each corner of the pagoda. According to Yang Xuanzhi who lived in Luoyang in the year 520, the pagoda could be seen from as far as 50 km (30 mi). The Yongning Pagoda was destroyed in 534 when it was struck by lightning and caught fire.

== See also ==
- List of tallest structures built before the 20th century

Records
Preceded by Great Pyramid of Giza	World's tallest structure ever built (disputed) c. 516–1221; 147 m	Succeeded by Old St Paul's Cathedral
Preceded by Great Pyramid of Giza	World's tallest existing structure (disputed) c. 516-532	Succeeded by Great Pyramid of Giza
