= Beisi Pagoda =

Pagoda in Suzhou, China

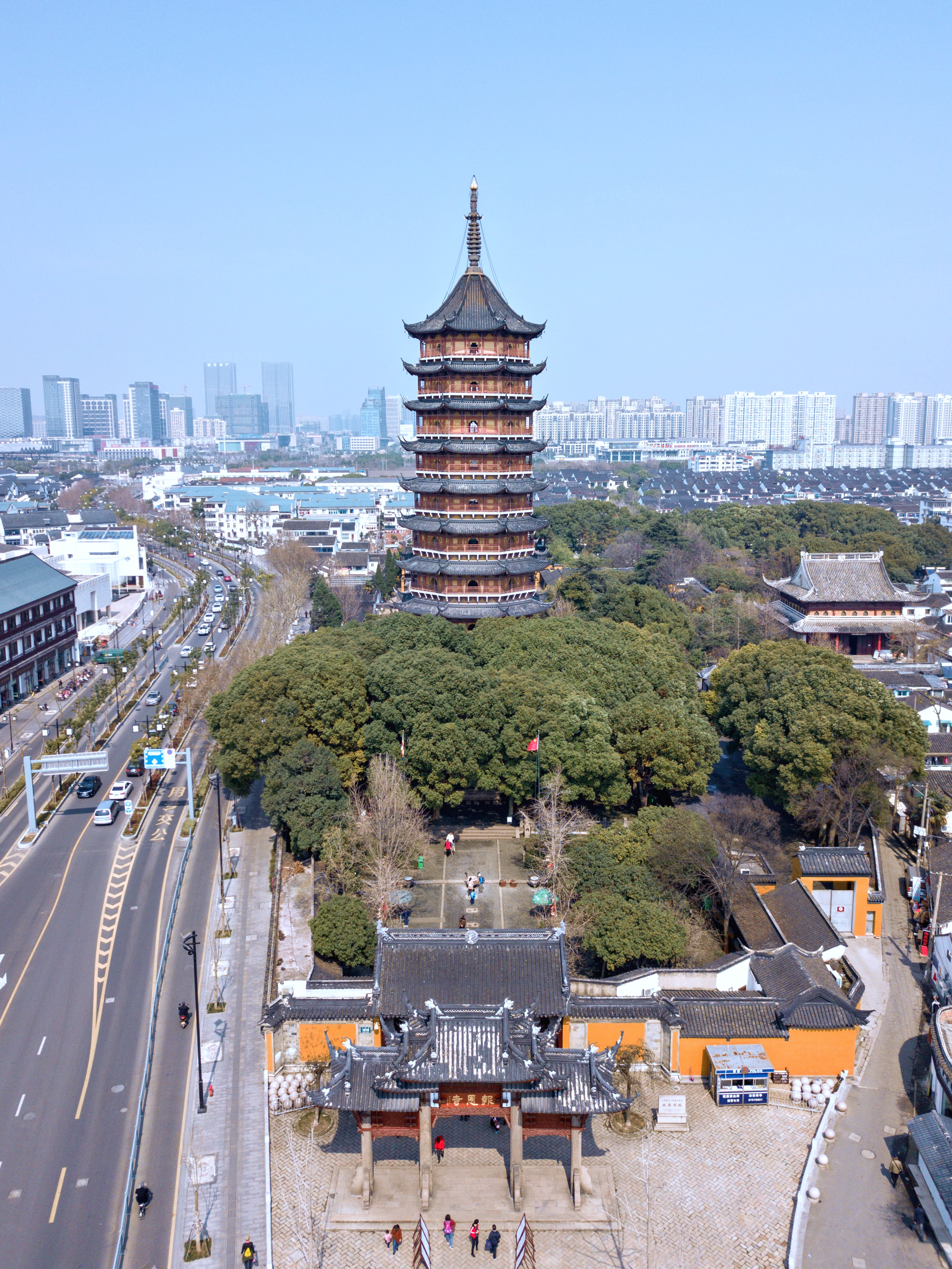
The Beisi Pagoda

The Beisi Pagoda (Chinese: 北寺塔; pinyin: Běisì Tǎ; Wade–Giles: Peiszu T'a; Suzhou Wu, Wugniu: poq^{7} zy^{6} thaeq^{7}, Wu Chinese pronunciation: [poʔ zz̩ tʰaʔ]) or North Temple Pagoda is a Chinese pagoda located at Bao'en Temple in Suzhou, Jiangsu Province, China. The base of the pagoda has an octagonal frame, and the tower rises nine stories in a total height of 76 m (249 ft). The pagoda was once eleven stories tall, but was damaged and reduced to nine stories. It's double eaves and flying corners are similar to that of the Liuhe Pagoda found in Hangzhou. Its base and outside walls are made of brick, the balustrades made of stone, and the eaves and banisters encircling the structure are made of wood.

== History ==
Although the present structure dates to the Ming dynasty (1368–1644) (with renovations in following eras), the historical site of construction for the pagoda dates back 1,700 years. A Buddhist pagoda built during the reign of Sun Quan in the 3rd century originally stood at the site (in honor of his wet nurse), along with another pagoda built during the Liang dynasty (502-557). The current design of the pagoda structure was made between the years 1131 and 1162, during the Song dynasty (960-1279). Patronage and construction for the Song era pagoda was headed by the Buddhist monk Dayuan. However, the pagoda was burnt down by fire towards the end of the Song dynasty and rebuilt during the Ming.

During the modern repairs of the pagoda in 1960 and 1975, Chinese artifacts were found within the steeple, including a copper turtle and statues of the Buddha. The latest restoration of the pagoda was in 2006.

== See also ==
- Architecture of the Song dynasty
- Chinese architecture
- List of tallest structures built before the 20th century
