= Anah =

Anah عانة
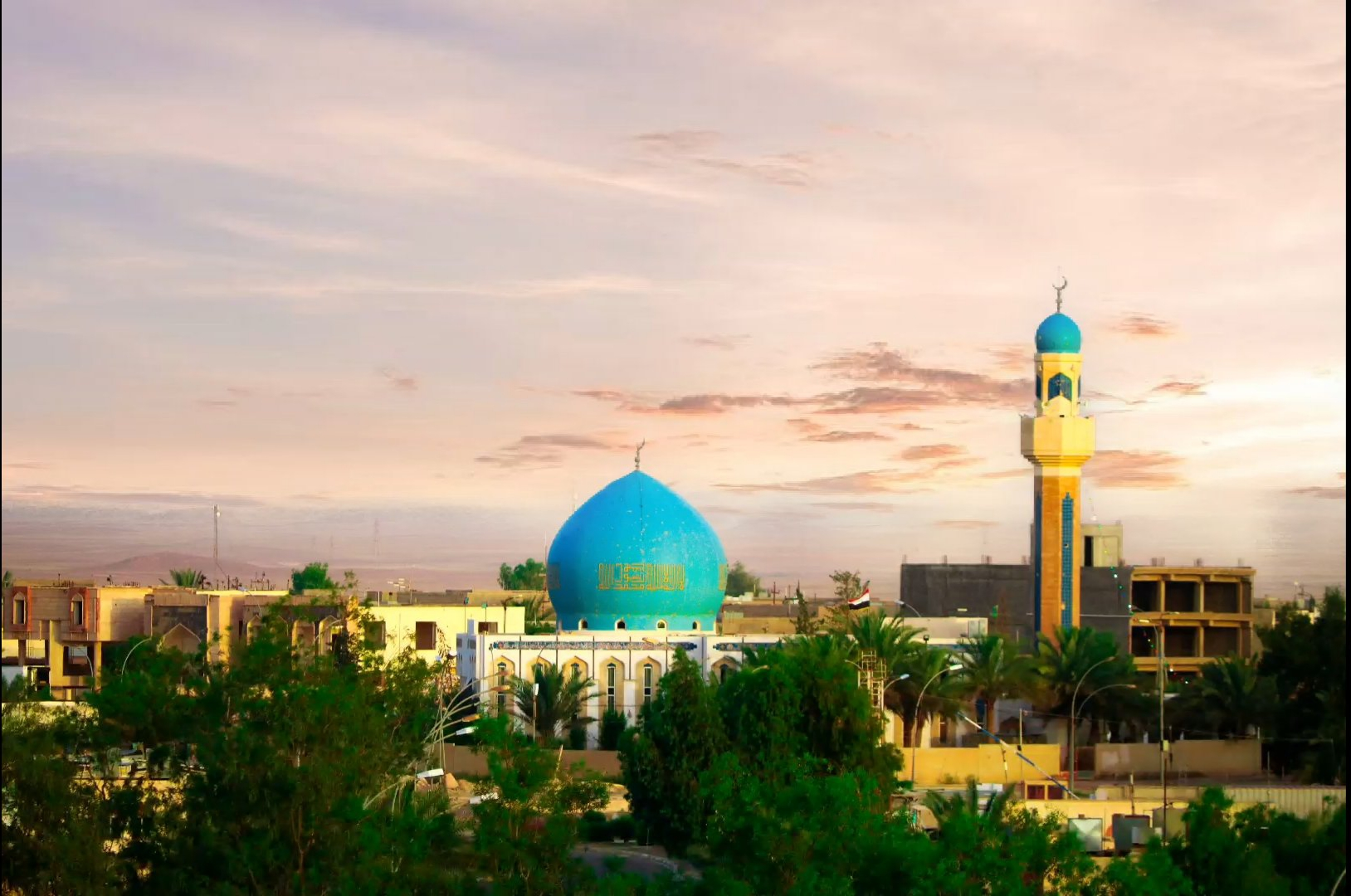
- Anah landscape

- Location within Iraq
- Coordinates: 34°22′20″N 41°59′15″E
- Country: Iraq
- Province: Al-Anbar

Government
  - Mayor: Saad Awwad
- Elevation: 34 m (112 ft)

Population (2018)
  - Total: 21,000
- Time zone: UTC+3 (GMT+3)
- Postal code: 31005

Anah or Ana (Arabic: عانة, romanized: ʿĀna, Syriac: ܐܢܐ), formerly also known as Anna, is an Iraqi town on the Euphrates approximately midway between the Gulf of Alexandretta and the Persian Gulf. Anah lies from west to east on the right bank along a bend of the river just before it turns south towards Hīt.

== Name ==
The town was called ^{(d)}Ha-na-at^{KI} in cuneiform texts from the Old Babylonian period, A-na-at of the land Suhum by the scribes of Tukulti-Ninurta c. 885 BC, and An-at by the scribes of Assur-nasir-pal II in 879 BC. The name has been connected with the widely worshipped war goddess Anat. It was known as Anathō (Ancient Greek: Άναθω) to Isidore Charax and Anatha to Ammianus Marcellinus; early Arabic writers described it variously as ʾĀna or (as if plural) ʾĀnāt.

== History ==
=== Middle Bronze Age ===
The earliest references to Anah are probably found in letters of the period of Zimri-Lim of Mari.

Under Hammurapi of Babylon the town was under Babylonian control, being included in the governorate of Sūḫu. Later, the town was under Assyrian rule.

=== Iron Age ===
At the beginning of the 8th century BC, Šamaš-rēša-uṣur and his son Ninurta-kudurrī-uṣur succeeded in creating an independent political entity, and called themselves "governors of Sūḫu and Mari". The land of Sūḫu occupied a quite extensive region on the Middle Euphrates, approximately from the area near Falluja in the southeast to the area of Ḫindanu (modern Tell Jabiriyah, near Al-Qa'im) in the northwest. Important evidence for this period was recovered during English and Iraqi salvage excavation campaigns at Sur Jurʿeh and on the island of ʿAna (Anah) in the early 1980s.

Xenophon recorded that the army of Cyrus the Younger resupplied during a campaign in 401 BC at "Charmande" near the end of a 90-parasang march between Korsote and Pylae, which likely intends Anah.

Anatha was the site where the Roman emperor Julian first met opposition in his AD 363 expedition against the Sassanid Empire. He got possession of the place and relocated its inhabitants.

=== Middle Ages ===
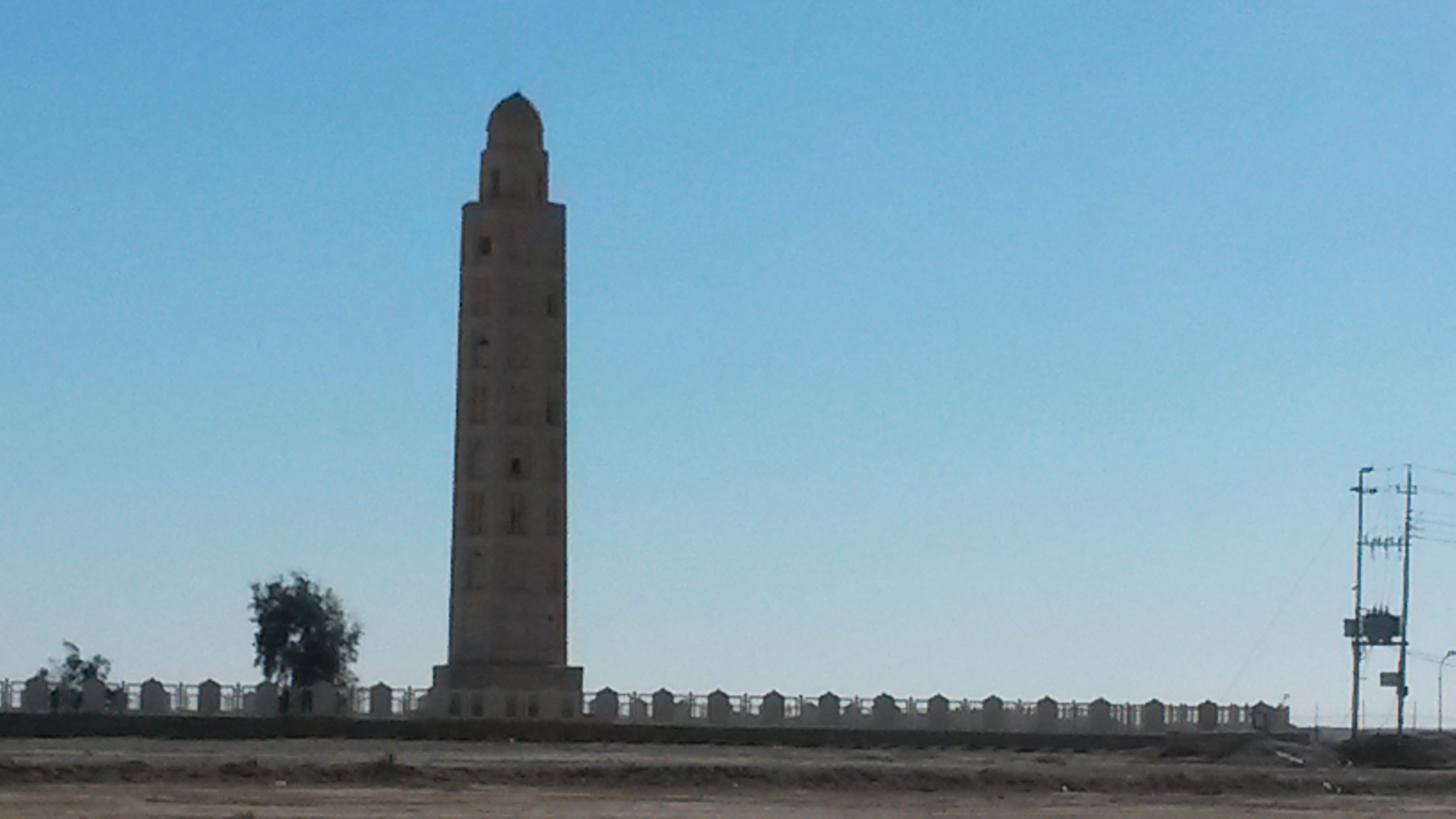
Minaret of Anah, Abbasid era heritage site, before its destruction.

In 657, during the Muslim conquest of Iraq, Ali's lieutenants Ziyad and Shureih were refused passage across the Euphrates at Anah. Later, in 1058, Anah was the place of exile of the caliph Qaim when al-Basasiri was in power. In the 14th century, Anah was the seat of the catholicos who served as primate over the Persian Christians. Throughout early Islamic rule, it was a prosperous trade town, well known for its date palms and gardens; in the 14th century, Mustafi wrote of the fame of its palm groves. Medieval Arab poets celebrated Anah's wine; Between the 14th and 17th centuries, Anah served as a headquarters for a host of regional Arab tribes.

=== Ottoman rule ===
Starting around 1535, during the period of Ottoman Iraq, the town served as the de facto capital of the Abu Rish bedouin emirs, whom the Ottomans appointed as governors of several sancaks (provinces) as well as çöl beyis or "desert emirs". In 1574, Leonhart Rauwolff found the town divided into two parts, the Turkish "so surrounded by the river that you cannot go into it but by boats" and the larger Arab section along one of the banks. In 1610, Texeira said Anah lay on both banks of the river, with which Pietro Della Valle agreed. In that year, Della Valle found the Scot George Strachan resident at Anah, working as the physician to the emir and studying Arabic; he also found some "sun worshippers" (actually Alawites) still living there. Della Valle and Texeira called Anah the principal Arab town on the Euphrates, controlling a major route west from Baghdad and territory reaching Palmyra.

About 1750, the Ottomans installed a rudimentary administration to run Anah and its district. After roughly a century, a more organized local government was put in place, whereby Anah became the center of a kaza belonging to the Baghdad Vilayet.

At the beginning of the 19th century, G.A. Olivier found only 25 men in service of the local prince, with residents fleeing daily to escape from bedouin attacks against which he offered no protection. He described the city as a single long street of five or six miles along a narrow strip of land between the river and a ridge of rocky hills. W. F. Ainsworth, chronicling the British Euphrates expedition, reported that in 1835 the Arabs inhabited the northwest part of the town, the Christians the center, and the Jews the southeast. The same year, the steamer Tigris went down in a storm just above Anah, near where Julian's force had suffered from a similar storm.

By the mid-19th century, the houses were separated from one another by fruit gardens, which also filled the riverine islands near the town. The most easterly island contained a ruined castle, while the ruins of ancient Anatho extended a further two miles along the left bank. It marked the boundary between the olive (north) and date (south) growing regions in the area. With the positioning of Turkish troops in the town around 1890, the locals no longer had to pay blackmail (huwwa) to the bedouins. Through the early 20th century, coarse cotton cloth was the only manufacture. In 1909 Anah had an estimated population of 15,000 and 2,000 houses. Most of the inhabitants were Sunni Muslim Arabs, though a small Jewish community lived on the town's southern edge.

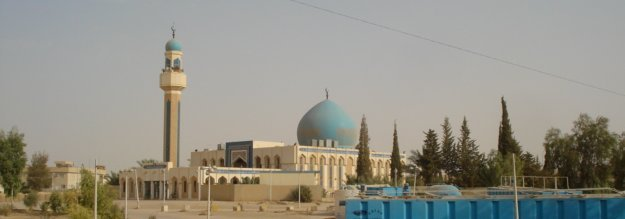
Mosque in Anah

=== Kingdom of Iraq ===
In 1918, the town was captured by British forces and by 1921, became incorporated into the Kingdom of Iraq. It remained an administrative center of a qadaa, part of the larger Ramadi-based liwa of Dulaym. Anah's qadaa also included the subdistricts of Hīt, al-Qa'im and Jubba. The townspeople's long feud with the inhabitants of Rawa was settled diplomatically by 1921. Its territory to the west was dominated by the subtribes of Anizzah, while to the east the Jarba branch of the Shammar held sway.

Most of Anah's building were located among a dense belt of date palms and was "reckoned as healthy and picturesque", according to historian S. H. Longrigg. The date palms were irrigated by water wheels. There were also more scattered dwelling in the mid-stream islands of the Euphrates near the town center. The women of the town were well known for their beauty and the weaving of cotton and wool textiles. The men, many of whom were compelled to emigrate to lack of living space, were largely engaged as boatmen and transporters of water to Baghdad. The town had relatively high educational standards, with eight schools built there by 1946.

F. R. Chesney reported about 1800 houses, two mosques, and 16 waterwheels. One minaret is particularly old. Northedge reported the locals commonly attributed it to the 11th century but opined that it was more likely from about a century after that. It rose from one of the islands and belonged to the local mosque. Dr. Muayad Said described it as an octagonal body "enhanced by alcoves, some of which are blind" and noted earlier conservation work undertaken in 1935, 1963 and 1964. When the valley was flooded by the Haditha Dam in 1984/85, the Iraqi State Board of Antiquities cut it into sections and removed it to the new Anah, where it was re-erected to a height of 28 meters (92 ft) at the end of the 1980s.

The Islamic State of Iraq and the Levant captured the town in 2014. On September 19, 2017, an offensive to retake the town from ISIS control began. After two days of fighting the town was recaptured by the Iraqi army.

== Climate ==
Anah has a hot desert climate (Köppen climate classification BWh). Most rain falls in the winter. The average annual temperature in Anah is 20.7 °C (69.3 °F). About 127 mm (5.00 in) of precipitation falls annually.

Climate data for Anah
Month	Jan	Feb	Mar	Apr	May	Jun	Jul	Aug	Sep	Oct	Nov	Dec	Year
Mean daily maximum °C (°F)	12.8 (55.0)	16.2 (61.2)	21.8 (71.2)	27.1 (80.8)	34.2 (93.6)	38.5 (101.3)	41.2 (106.2)	41.0 (105.8)	38.0 (100.4)	31.8 (89.2)	22.0 (71.6)	14.1 (57.4)	28.2 (82.8)
Daily mean °C (°F)	7.6 (45.7)	10.3 (50.5)	15.8 (60.4)	20.8 (69.4)	27.7 (81.9)	32.0 (89.6)	34.0 (93.2)	33.4 (92.1)	29.7 (85.5)	24.0 (75.2)	14.8 (58.6)	8.5 (47.3)	21.6 (70.8)
Mean daily minimum °C (°F)	3.9 (39.0)	5.4 (41.7)	8.1 (46.6)	12.6 (54.7)	18.0 (64.4)	21.8 (71.2)	24.5 (76.1)	23.5 (74.3)	19.6 (67.3)	14.8 (58.6)	7.1 (44.8)	3.2 (37.8)	13.5 (56.4)
Average precipitation mm (inches)	19 (0.7)	17 (0.7)	20 (0.8)	22 (0.9)	6 (0.2)	0 (0)	0 (0)	0 (0)	0 (0)	5 (0.2)	10 (0.4)	23 (0.9)	122 (4.8)
Source: FAO
