= Minaret of Anah =

Historic minaret in Anah, Iraq

- مئذنة عانة
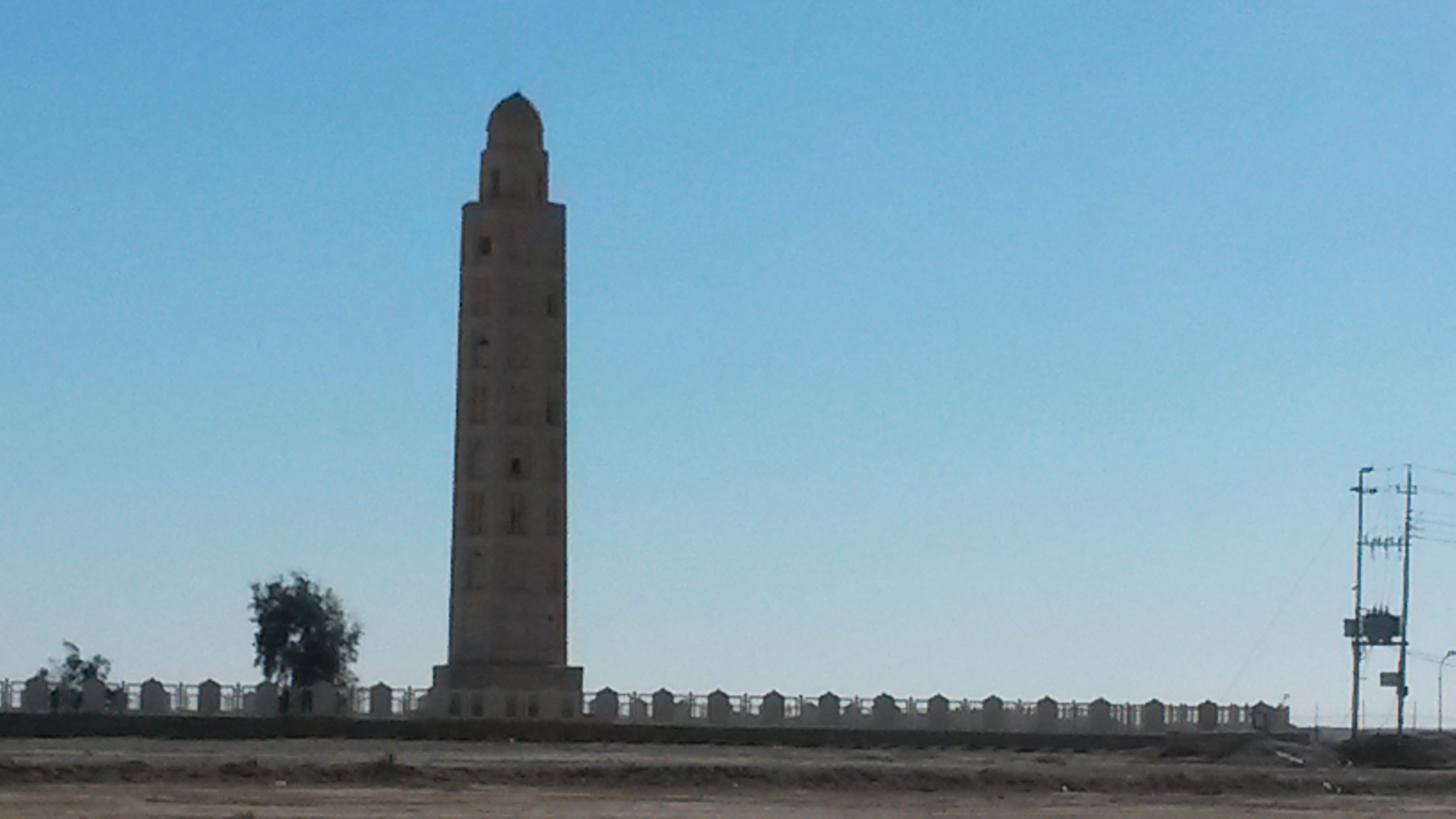
- The minaret in 2013

- Location of the minaret in Iraq

Religion
- Affiliation: Islam
- Ecclesiastical or organisational status: Minaret
- Status: Reconstructed

Location
- Location: Anah, Al Anbar Governorate
- Country: Iraq
- Interactive map of Minaret of Anah
- Coordinates: 34°22′08″N 42°00′34″E

Architecture
- Type: Islamic architecture
- Style: Abbasid
- Founder: Uqaylid dynasty
- Completed: 996-1096 CE; 2013 (rebuilt); 2022 (reconstruction)
- Destroyed: 2006 (vandalism); 2016 (ISIL)

Specifications
- Minaret height: 28 metres (92 ft)
- Materials: Stone, gypsum

The Minaret of Anah (Arabic: مئذنة عانة), also known as the Manaret al-Anah and the Tower of Anah, is a free-standing minaret in Anah, in the governorate of Al Anbar, Iraq. It was built during the late Abbasid period by a ruler of the Uqaylid dynasty. The minaret was destroyed twice in the 21st century, and it was subsequently rebuilt.

== History ==
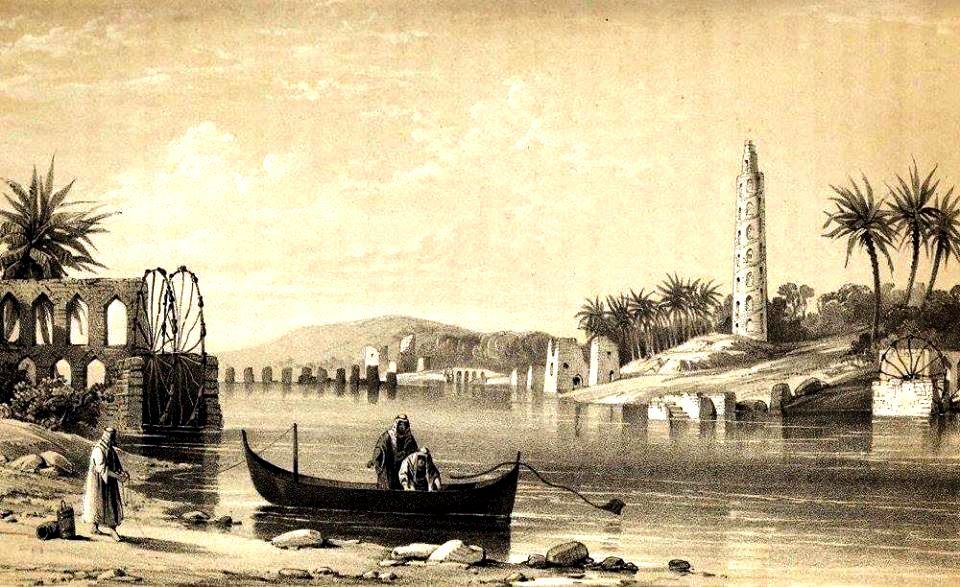
The minaret in a 19th-century illustration

The minaret was built by one of the Uqaylid rulers. Experts have dated the construction of the minaret to between 996 CE to 1096 CE, with evidence from inscriptions and archeological features.

In the mid-80s, the late president Saddam Hussein inaugurated several dams in the Euphrates river in order to secure the stable supply of water, affecting the region where the tower was located and resulted in the potential danger of the tower submerging into the water. A team of Iraqi archeological experts were able to figure out a plan to dismantle the minaret into at least 28 pieces, and put it back together at a nearby, less dangerous site.

== Architecture ==
The minaret is approximately 28 metres (92 ft) high and consists of eight levels. On the northern side of the base of the minaret, one can access the minaret's interior through the opening entrance, and a staircase leads to a balcony. The octagonal spire below the small dome topping the minaret has a total of 64 niches. The minaret slightly leans on one end, but the tilt is not very prominent.

As a freestanding tower it was built with rubble stones and covered with juss, or gypsum, on an octagonal plan. The octagonal base has an arched opening on the north side providing access to the interior of the minaret. The shaft ends with an octagonal recessed spire covered by a low dome. This recess creates a space for the balcony inscribed inside the minaret envelope; it is accessible through four arched openings situated on the sides of the octagonal spire below the dome.

== Destruction ==
The minaret was destroyed twice, in 2006 and in 2016.

=== 2006 destruction ===
The minaret suffered vandalism attacks in 2006. It was then blown up completely by a still-unknown perpetrator. The explosion was considered among a series of events which targeted Iraqi cultural heritage sites, including the statue of Abu Ja’afar al-Mansur in Baghdad. The Iraqi Accord Front accused Shiite militias of deliberately destroying cultural heritage built during the Sunni dynasties, including the statue of al-Mansur and the top of the Great Mosque of Samarra's historic Malwiya Minaret. Fortunately, the minaret was rebuilt in 2013, by the work of Iraqi engineers, artists and heritage conservation based on the preserved architectural blueprint from the Iraqi Ministry of Tourism.

=== 2016 destruction ===
The minaret was destroyed in late 2016 by the Islamic State of Iraq and the Levant as part of an attempt to destroy cultural heritage in Iraq.

== Reconstruction ==
The minaret was reconstructed in 2022, with efforts from Iraq's Ministry of Culture. Several fragments from the ruined minaret were also sampled. On 1 January 2023, further improvements and rehabilitation efforts were announced such as extending electrical supply to the area and rebuilding the guardhouse.

== See also ==
- Islam in Iraq
- Imam Dur Mausoleum, another structure associated with the Uqaylid dynasty
