= List of oldest minarets =

This article lists some but by no means all of the oldest known minaret towers in the world.

The oldest minaret still surviving is that of the Great Mosque of Kairouan in Tunisia. It was constructed in 836 AD and is considered as the prototype for all the square shaped minarets built in the Western Muslim World.

Most ancient, surviving minarets were constructed adjacent to a mosque, for the Muslim call to prayer (Adhan) five times each day by a muezzin (crier). A few minarets were built as watchtowers, landmarks or symbols of victory or glory of a Muslim Khanate or empire. In some instances, like the Minaret of Jam only the minaret tower survives today while the adjoining mosques and other structures were destroyed over time by nature and invaders.

== List of oldest minarets ==
This list ranks the oldest surviving minarets in the world. Only minarets built before 1900 AD. are included.

Name	Image	Location	Country	Region	Height (m)	Height (ft)	Year built	Status	Notes	Ref.
Great Mosque of Kairouan Minaret		Kairouan	Tunisia	North Africa	31.5	103	836	Preserved		
Great Mosque of Samarra Minaret		Samarra	Iraq	Western Asia	52	171	851	Preserved		
Abu Dulaf Mosque Minaret		Samarra	Iraq	Western Asia	32	105	859	Preserved		
Umayyad Mosque's minaret of the bride		Damascus	Syria	Western Asia	30+	98	lower part 9th cent., upper part 12th cent.	Preserved	The mosque's northern and oldest minaret	
Great Mosque of Qal'at Bani Hammad		M’sila Province	Algeria	North Africa	25	82	1007/1008		Part of the World Heritage Site	
Kutlug Timur Minaret		Konye-Urgench	Turkmenistan	Central Asia	60+	197	1011		Believed to be the tallest of the ancient minarets in Central Asia. Dome was destroyed in 1221 by Mongols. Only 60 meters remain.	
Burana Tower		Chuy Valley	Kyrgyzstan	Central Asia	25	82	11th Century	Preserved	Originally 45 metres tall. Top destroyed by earthquake in 15th century.	
Uzgen Minaret		Uzgen	Kyrgyzstan	Central Asia	27.5	90	11th century	Preserved		
Ali minaret		Isfahan	Iran	Western Asia	52-54	171-177	11th-12th Century	preserved	Formerly built for a Seljuk-era mosque, now attached to a Safavid-era mosque.	
Ghazni Minarets		Ghazni	Afghanistan	South Asia	20	65	12th century	Endangered	2 minaret towers. Upper portion of tower lost to earthquake in 1902	
Jarkurgan minaret		Jarkurgan	Uzbekistan	Central Asia	21.6	71	1108			
Khosrogerd Minaret		Sabzevar	Iran	Western Asia	30	98	1112			
Kalyan minaret		Bukhara	Uzbekistan	Central Asia	45.6	150	1127	Preserved		
Minaret of Jam		Shahrak District	Afghanistan	South Asia	65	213	1194	Endangered	In UNESCO List of World Heritage in Danger	
Kutubiyya Mosque Minaret		Marrakesh	Morocco	North Africa	77	253	1195	Preserved		
Qutub Minar		Delhi	India	South Asia	72.5	238	1311	Preserved	Tallest minaret made of bricks(marble and red sandstone).	
5 Musalla Minarets of Herat		Herat	Afghanistan	South Asia	55	180	1417	Endangered	Only 5 of original 20 minarets remain.	
Menara Kudus Mosque Minaret		Kudus Regency	Indonesia	Southeast Asia	18	59	1549			
Great Mosque of Banten Minaret		Serang	Indonesia	Southeast Asia	24	78	1632			
Eger minaret		Eger	Hungary	Central Europe	40	131	17th century	Preserved	One of three surviving minarets of Ottoman rule in Hungary.	
Hiran Minar		Sheikhupura	Pakistan	Asia	110	330	17th century	Endangered	Mughal Empire	

== See also ==
- Minaret
- List of tallest minarets
- List of tallest mosques
- List of the oldest mosques
