= List of tallest minarets =

This is a list of the tallest minarets in the world. It ranks minarets by their height.

The tallest minaret in the world is the minaret of the Djamaa el Djazaïr in Algiers, Algeria which stands at 265 metres (870 ft).

== List of tallest minarets ==
This list ranks the tallest minarets in the world. Only minarets taller than 25 metres (82 feet) or remarkable for some distinctive feature are included.

Name	Image	Location	Country	Height (m)	Height (ft)	Year built	Status	Notes	Ref.
Djamaa el Djazaïr Minaret		Algiers	Algeria	265	869	2019			
Hassan II Mosque Minaret		Casablanca	Morocco	210	689	1993			
Menara Pemuda dan Perdamaian		Indramayu	Indonesia	201	659				
Sultan Salahuddin Abdul Aziz Mosque Minarets		Selangor	Malaysia	142.3	467	1988			
Egypt's Islamic Cultural Center Minarets		New Administrative Capital	Egypt	140	459	2023			
Putra Mosque		Putrajaya	Malaysia	116	380	1999			
Mosque of Sheikh Ibrahim Al-Ibrahim		Caracas	Venezuela	113	370	1989			
Al-Masjid an-Nabawi Minarets		Medina	Saudi Arabia	105	344				
Al Jabbar Grand Mosque Minaret		Bandung	Indonesia	99	325	2023			
Grand Jamia Mosque, Karachi		Karachi	Pakistan	99	325	2021			
Pondok Pesantren Walibarokah Minaret		Kediri	Indonesia	99	325	2009			
Great Mosque of Central Java Minaret		Semarang	Indonesia	99	325	2006			
Sultan Qaboos Grand Mosque Main Minaret		Muscat	Oman	91.5	300	2001			
Faisal Mosque Minarets		Islamabad	Pakistan	90	300	1986			
Great Mosque of Mecca Minarets		Makkah (Mecca)	Saudi Arabia	89	292				
Selimiye Mosque Minarets		Edirne	Turkey	70.89	239.5	1574		Tallest Ottoman minarets.	
Delimeđe Mosque Minarets		Delimeđe	Serbia	77.2	253	2009		The mosque with the tallest minarets in Serbia and in Europe outside of Turkey.	
Kutubiyya Mosque Minaret		Marrakesh	Morocco	77	253	1195			
Qutub Minar		Delhi	India	72.5	238	1311	Preserved	Tallest minaret made of bricks.	
Pećigrad Mosque Minarets		Pećigrad	Bosnia and Herzegovina	71	233	2020		The tallest minaret in Bosnia and Herzegovina.	
Minar-e-Pakistan		Lahore	Pakistan	70	230	1968			
Istiqlal Mosque Minaret		Jakarta	Indonesia	66.6	218	1974		The symbolize the divine oneness of God.	
Podgredina Blue Mosque Minarets		Podgredina	Bosnia and Herzegovina	66	217	2018		The first mosque with 5 şerefe's (balconies) on a minaret.	
Minaret of Jam		Shahrak District	Afghanistan	65	213	1194	Endangered	In UNESCO List of World Heritage in Danger	
Minaret in the Lednice–Valtice Cultural Landscape		Lednice	Czech Republic	62	203	1804	Preserved	Tallest in all non-Islamic countries. Built as a park decoration.	
Turhan Emin-Begova Mosque Minarets		Ustikolina	Bosnia and Herzegovina	60	197	1448	Rebuilt	It is believed, that this is the first mosque ever built in Bosnia and Herzegovina.	
Kutlug Timur Minaret		Konye-Urgench	Turkmenistan	60	197	1011		Believed to be the tallest of the ancient minarets in Central Asia. Dome was destroyed in 1221 by Mongols. Only 60 meters remain.	
Islam Khoja Minaret		Khiva	Uzbekistan	56.6	170	1910	Preserved		
Kalyan Minaret		Bukhara	Uzbekistan	45.6	150	1127	Preserved		
Juma Mosque		Balaken	Azerbaijan	44	144	1877			
Kajserija Mosque		Goražde	Bosnia and Herzegovina	43.5	143	2007			
Vabkent Minaret		Vobkent	Uzbekistan	40.3	145	1199	Preserved		
Kalta Minara		Khiva	Uzbekistan	29.0	86	1852	Preserved		
Uzgen Minaret		Uzgen	Kyrgyzstan	27.5	90	11th Century	Preserved		
Burana Tower		Chuy Valley	Kyrgyzstan	25	82	11th Century	Preserved	Originally 45 metres tall. Top destroyed by earthquake in 15th century.	
Great Mosque of Banten Minaret		Serang	Indonesia	24	78	1632			
Menara Kudus Mosque Minaret		Kudus Regency	Indonesia	18	59	1549			
Mahmoudiya Mosque		Tel Aviv	Israel	18	59	19th century			

== See also ==
- List of tallest mosques
- Minaret
- Mosque
- List of oldest minarets
