= Burana Tower =

Large minaret in the Chüy Valley in northern Kyrgyzstan

- Бурана мунарасы (Kyrgyz)
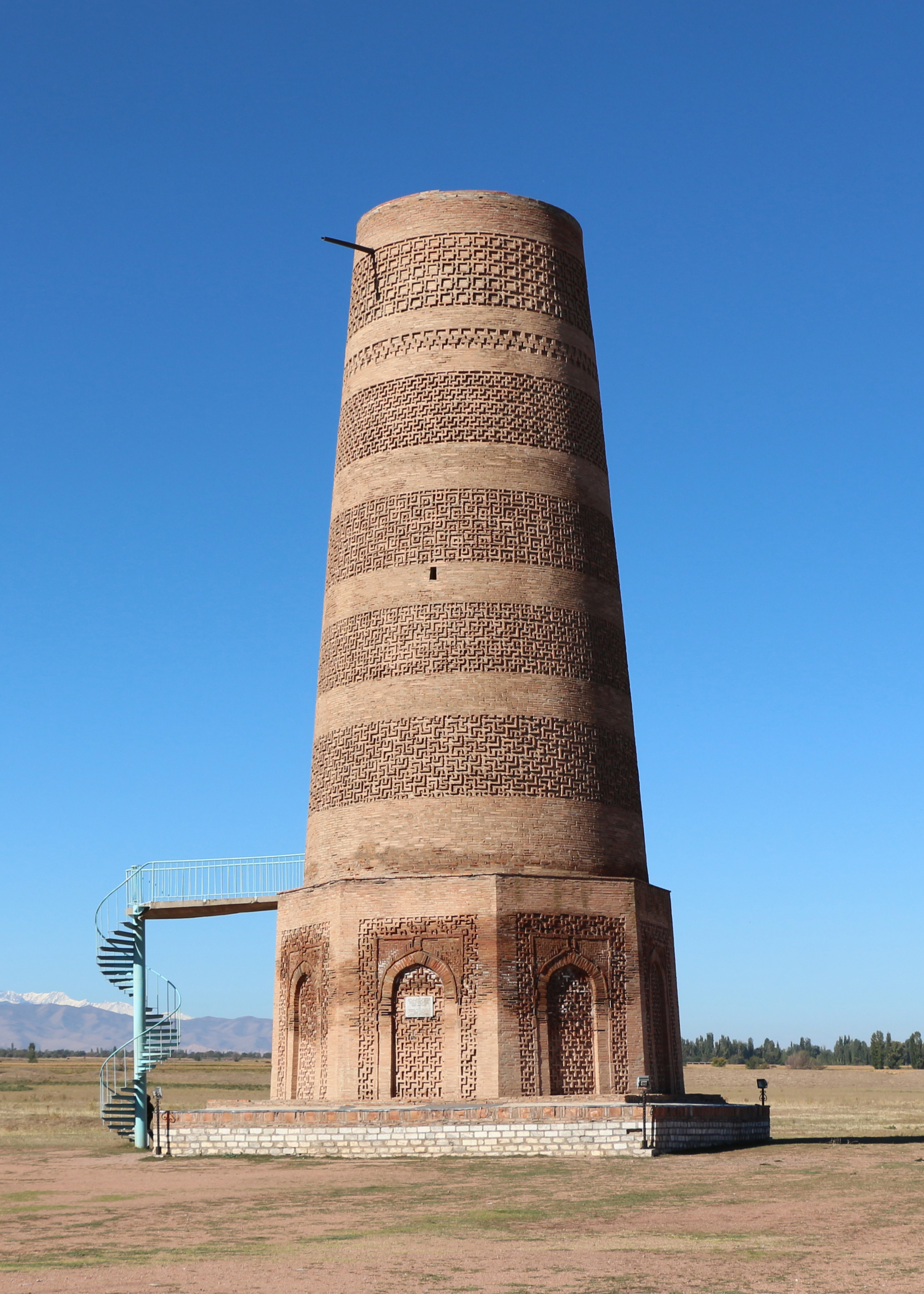
- Burana Tower

- Location in Kyrgyzstan Balasagun (Kyrgyzstan)
- 42°44′49″N 75°14′55″E
- Type: Minaret
- Location: Balasagun, Kyrgyzstan
- Region: Chüy Region

History
- Built: 9th century
- Built by: Karakhanids

Site notes
- Material: Bricks
- Height: 25 m (82 ft)
- Architectural style: Minaret

The Burana Tower (Kyrgyz: Бурана мунарасы) is a large minaret in the Chüy Valley in northern Kyrgyzstan. It is located about 80 km east of the country's capital Bishkek, near the town of Tokmok. The tower, along with grave markers, some earthworks and the remnants of a castle and three mausoleums, is all that remains of the ancient city of Balasagun, which was established by the Karakhanids at the end of the 9th century. The tower was built in the 11th century and was used as a template for other minarets. An external staircase and steep, winding stairway inside the tower enables visitors to climb to the top. It is one of the oldest architectural constructions in Central Asia.

The tower was originally 45 m (148 ft) high. However, over the centuries a number of earthquakes caused significant damage to the structure. The last major earthquake in the 15th century destroyed the top half of the tower, reducing it to its current height of 25 m (82 ft). A renovation project was carried out in the 1970s to restore its foundation and repair the west-facing side of the tower, which was in danger of collapse.

The entire site, including the mausoleums, castle foundations and grave markers, now functions as museum and there is a small building on the site containing historical information as well as artifacts found at the site and in the surrounding regions.

== Legend ==
A legend connected with the tower says that a daughter of a powerful khan had been born. The khan celebrated the occasion by inviting all the fortune tellers and wise man from the country to tell him the future of his daughter. One old man said that his daughter would die from a spider bite on her sixteenth birthday. To protect her, the khan built a tall tower for her daughter to reside in, alone. Servants of the khan brought her food, delivering it in a basket via climbing a ladder that was put against the tower. Everything was inspected thoroughly to make sure no spider would be able to get in the tower.

On her sixteenth birthday, the khan celebrated her birthday by bringing a basket of fruits for her. The khan failed to notice a poisonous spider that had concealed itself in the basket. As his daughter reached for a fruit, the poisonous spider bit her and killed her. The khan was so distraught that he cried so loudly, part of the tower went to shambles.

== Gallery ==
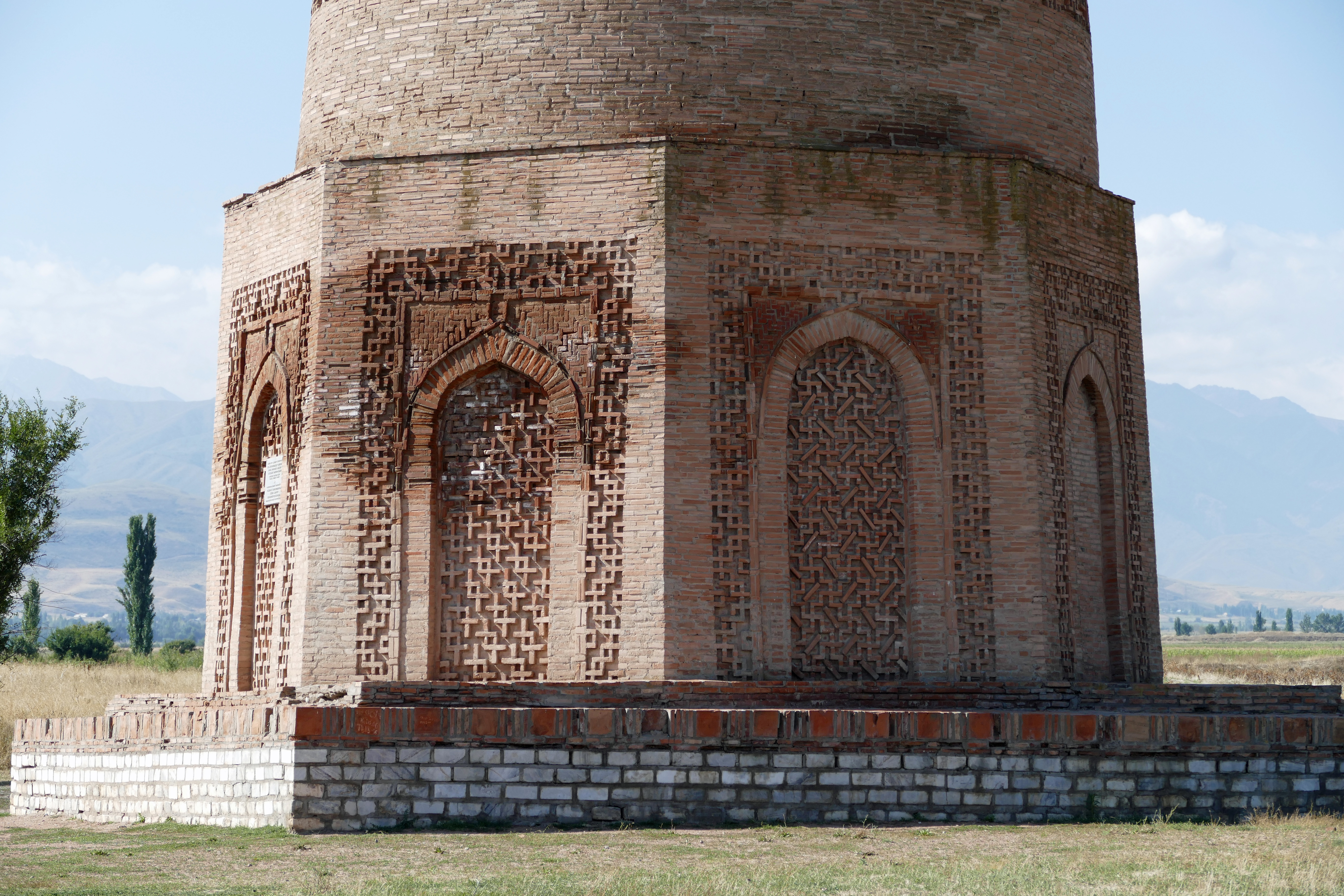
Decorative details of the base

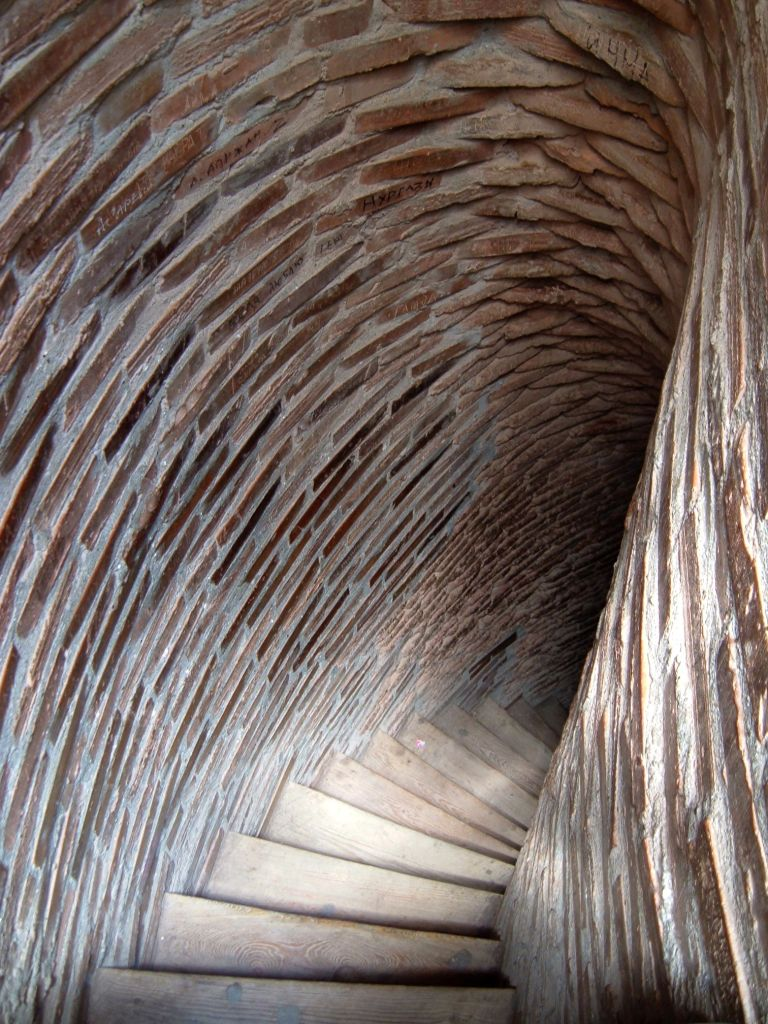
The winding stairway inside the Burana Tower

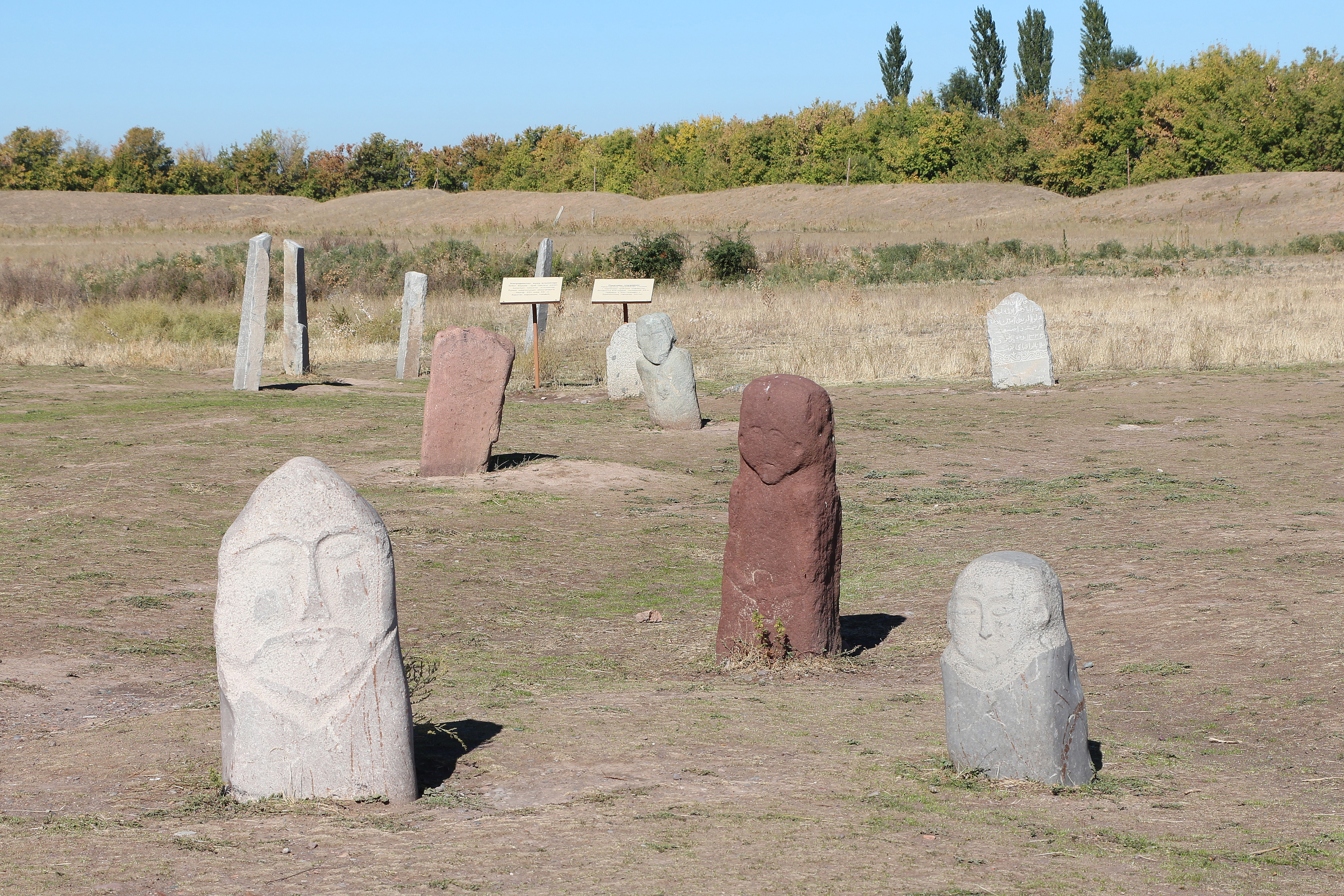
Balbals on the site

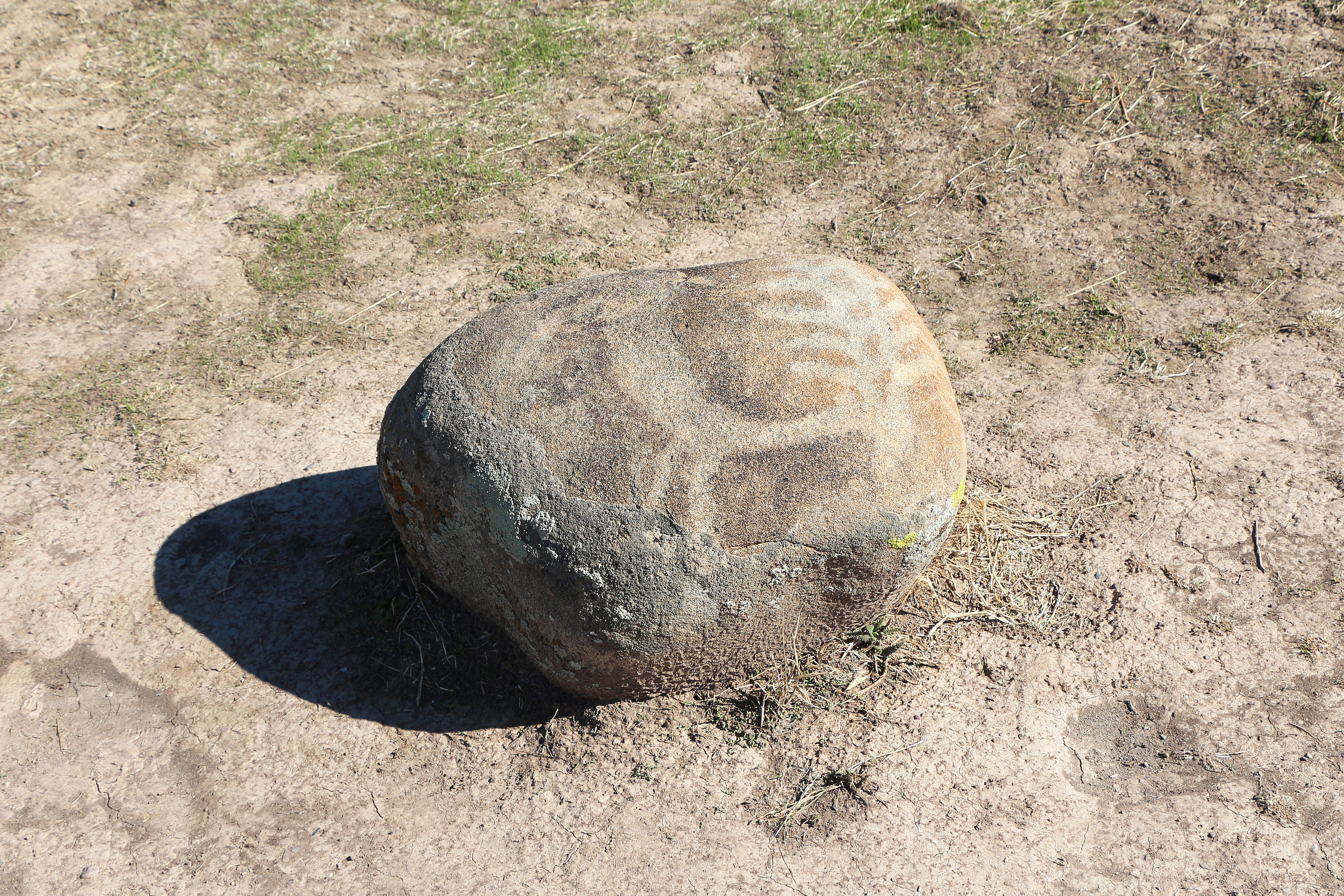
Petroglyph on the site

Tower site 122

== See also ==
- Uzgen Minaret
- Kutlug Timur Minaret (Turkmenistan)
- List of oldest minarets
- List of tallest minarets
