= Uzgen Minaret =

- Özgön Minar, Uzgend Minaret
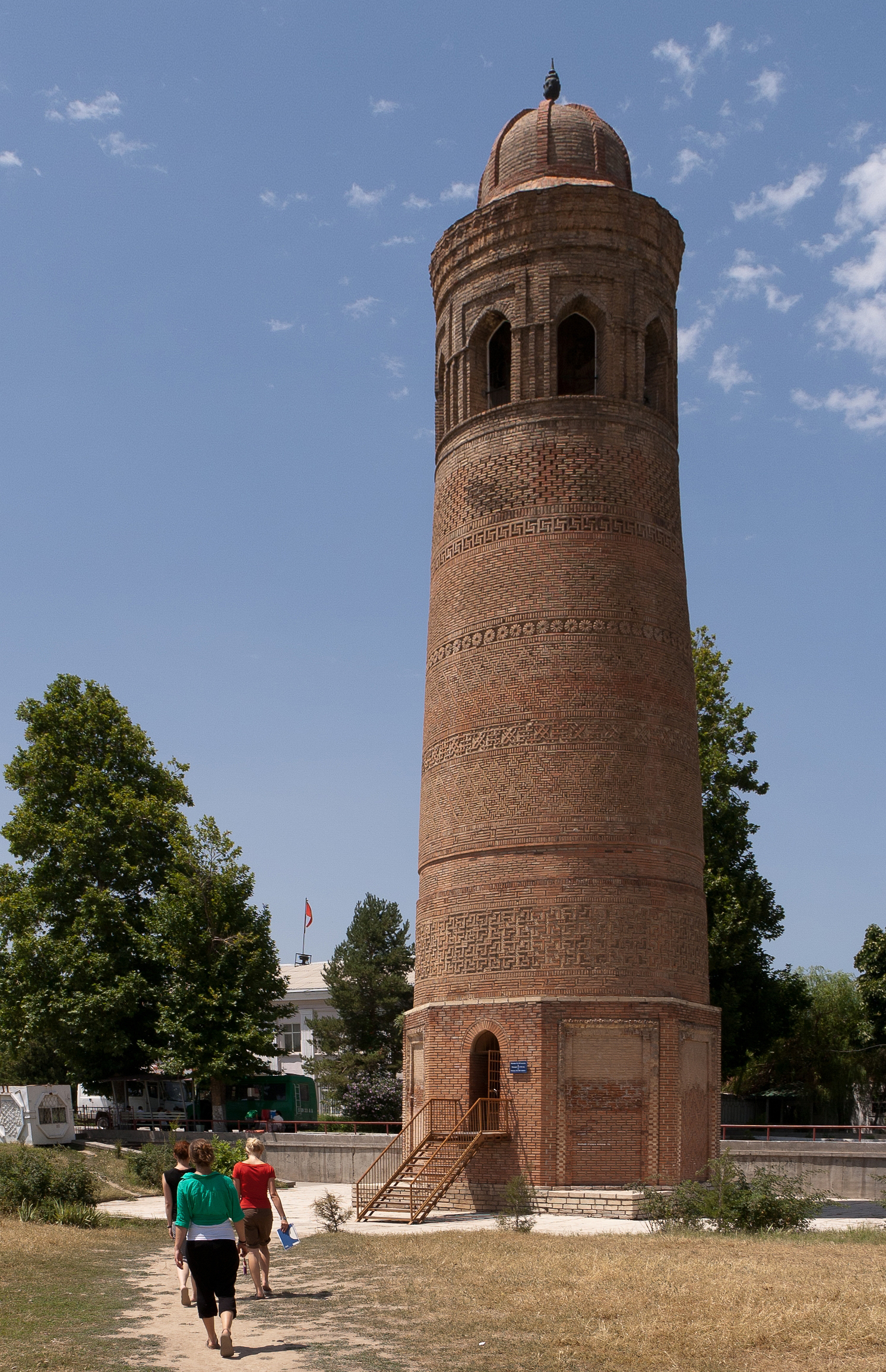
- Minaret at the Uzgen as of 2012

- Location in Kyrgyzstan
- 40°46′0″N 73°18′0″E
- Location: Uzgen
- Region: Osh Region

Site notes
- Material: Bricks
- Height: 27.5 m (90 ft)
- Architectural style: Minaret

The Uzgen Minaret also spelled as Özgön Minar or Uzgend Minaret is an 11th-century minaret tower located in Uzgen, Kyrgyzstan. It forms part of the ancient ruins in Uzgen along with three well preserved mausoleums located nearby. Uzgen Minaret is a 27.5 metres (90 feet) tall tapering tower, with an 8.5 metres (28 feet) base diameter, reducing to 6.2 metres (20 feet) at the top.

Built with bricks, the Uzgen minaret's architecture consist of three distinctive parts. It has a 5 metres (16 feet) high octahedron shaped lower part and a tapering cylindrical middle part, similar to the Burana Tower in northern Kyrgyzstan. The upper part with arched windows and a cupola is a relatively recent addition, built in 1923 to 1924.

== Gallery ==
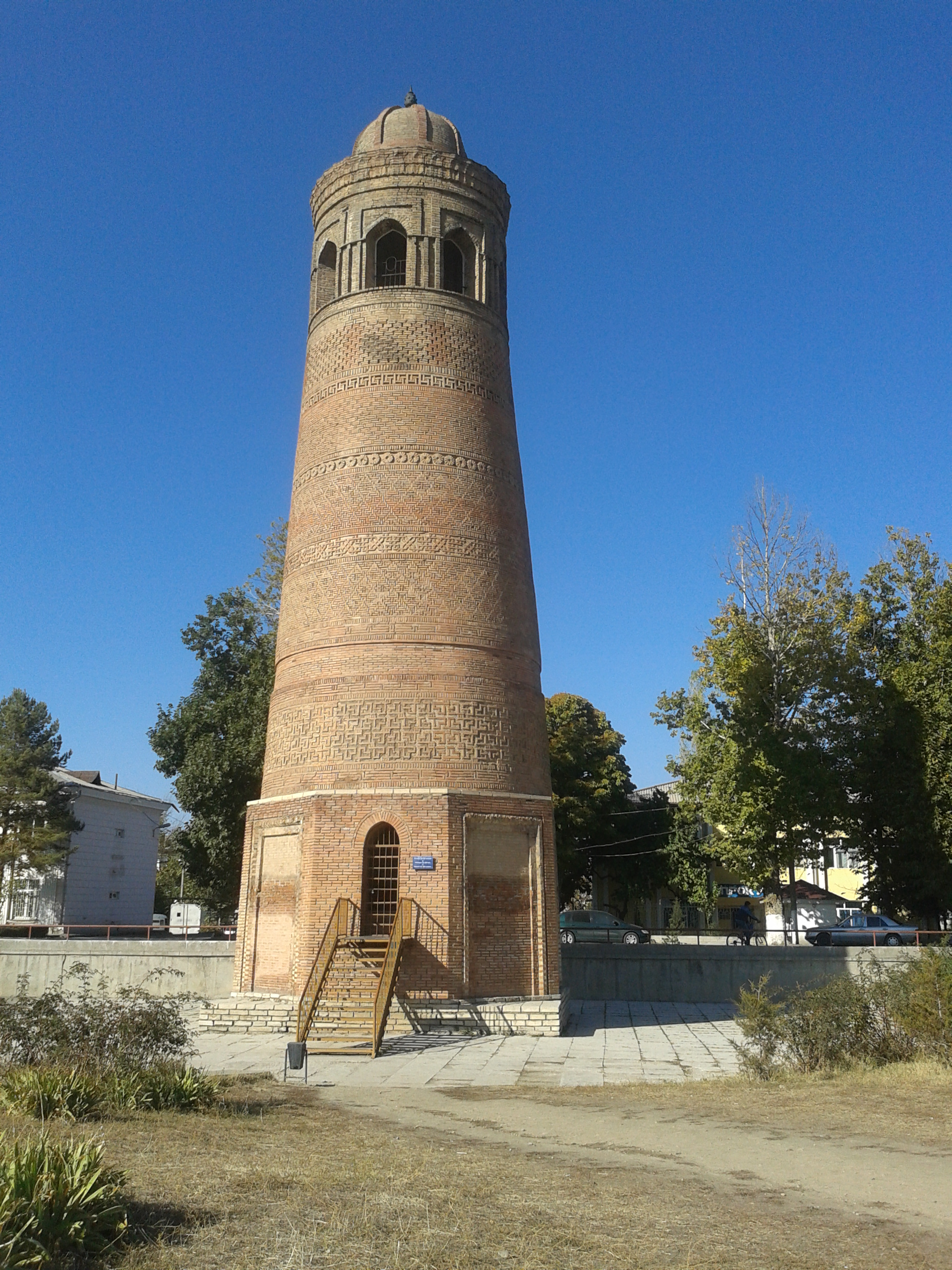

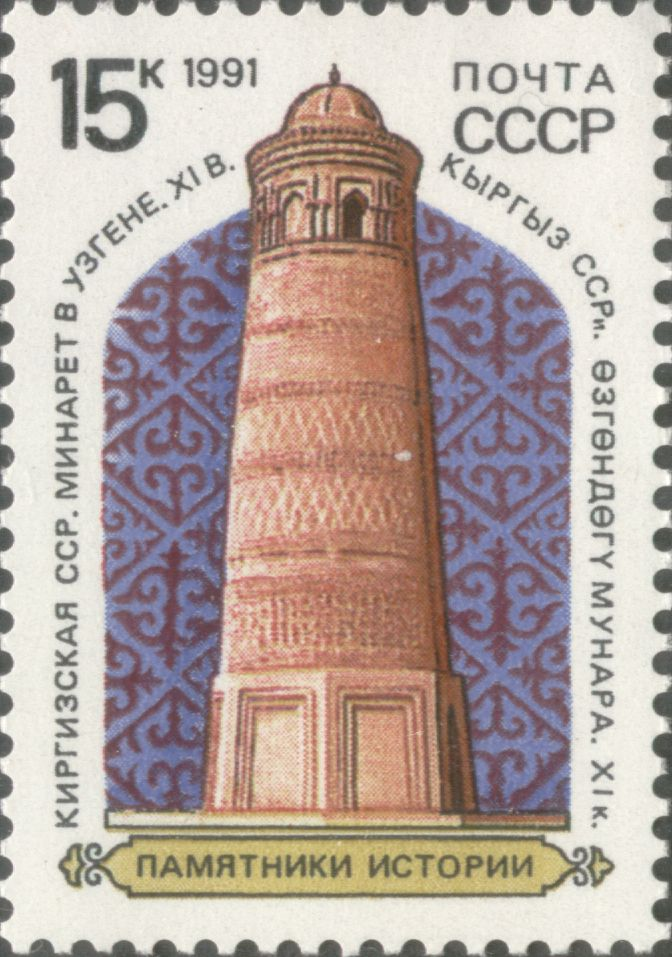

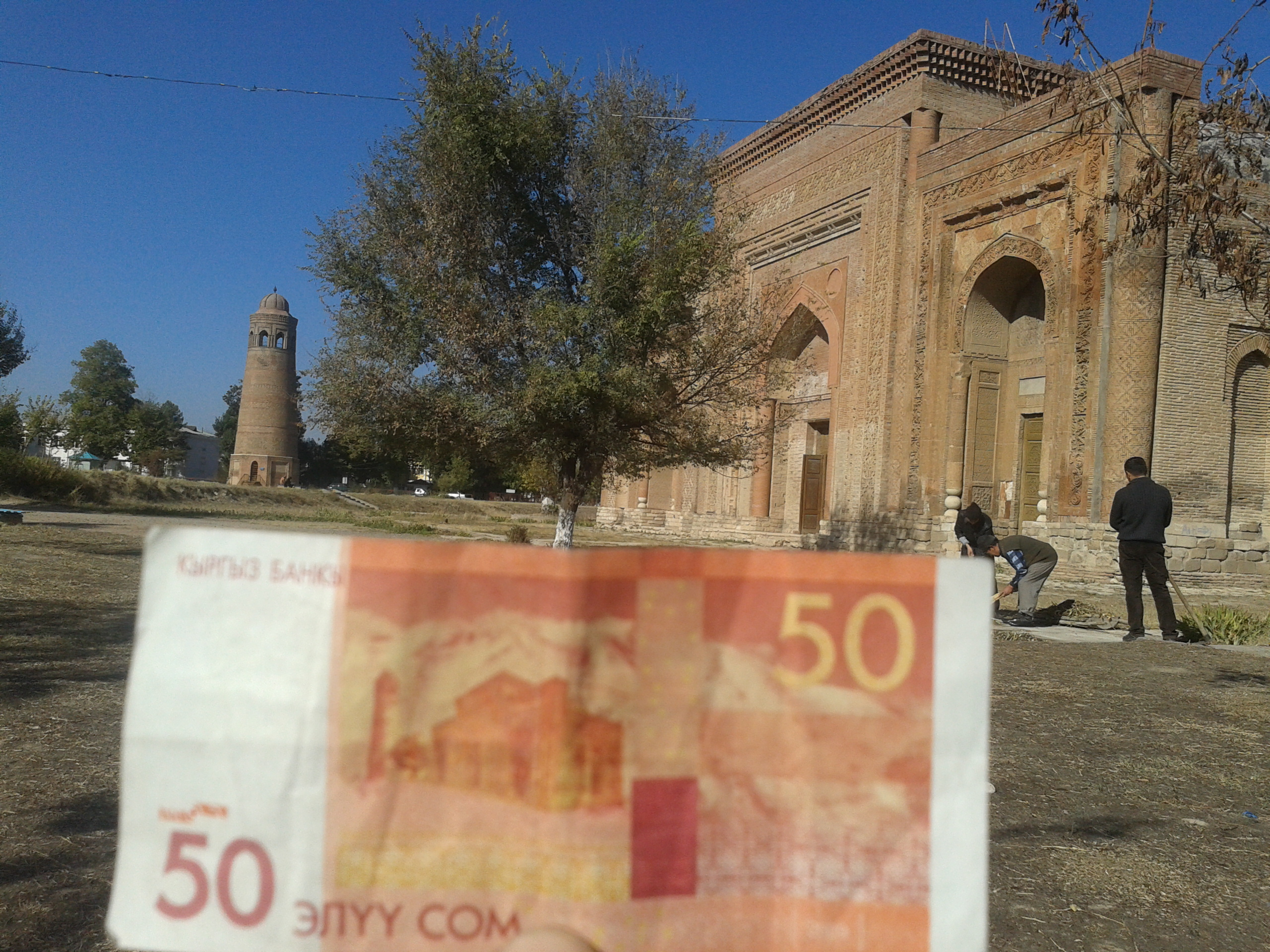
Minaret and mausoleums depicted in a banknote.

== See also ==
- Minaret
- List of oldest minarets
- List of tallest minarets
