= Delimeđe =

- Village (Selo)
- Location within Serbia
- Coordinates: 43°06′N 20°18′E
- Country: Serbia
- District: Raška District
- Municipality: Tutin

Population (2002)
  - Total: 445
- Time zone: UTC+1 (CET)
  - Summer (DST): UTC+2 (CEST)

Delimeđe is a village in the municipality of Tutin, Serbia. According to the 2002 census, the village has a population of 445 people. The two minarets of the mosque constructed in 2013, with the height of 77.2 meters, are the tallest in Serbia and in Europe outside of Turkey.
