= Dahan-e Falezak =

Dahan-e Falezak دهن فليزک
- Location within Afghanistan
- Country: Afghanistan
- Province: Ghor
- District: Shahrak
- Elevation: 2,385 m (7,825 ft)

Dahan-e Falezak (Dari: دهن فليزک) is the district center of Shahrak District in Ghor province, Afghanistan. It is located on 34.1000°N 64.2667°E at 2,385 m altitude. Very close to it is situated the village of Shahrak, which gives the name of the district.
