= Ralph Pinder-Wilson =

British historian

Ralph H. Pinder-Wilson (17 January 1919 – 6 October 2008) was a British historian of Islamic art. He is most noteworthy for his studies of Afghan architecture while Director of the British Institute of Afghan Studies in Kabul (1976–82) which included his study of the Minaret of Jam which is a UNESCO World Heritage Site. He graduated from Christ Church, Oxford and then joined the Indian Army where he learnt Persian.
