= Khosrogerd Minaret =

12th century minaret in Iran

Khosrowgerd Minaret
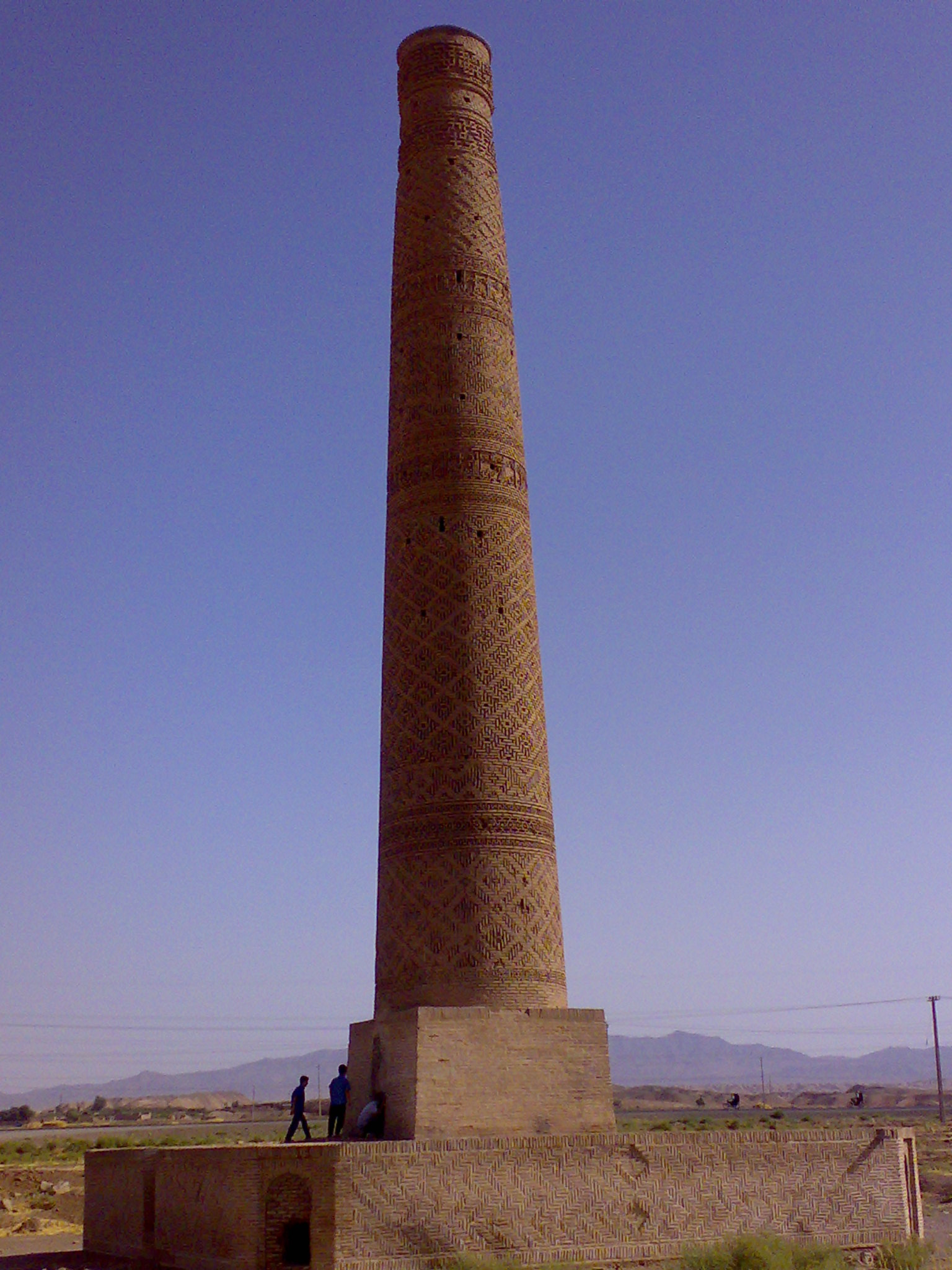

- Location within Iran
- 36°12′32″N 57°35′43″E

Iran National Heritage List
- Official name: Khosrowgerd Minaret
- Type: Minaret
- Designated: 1932
- Reference no.: 77
- Conservation organization: Cultural Heritage, Handicrafts and Tourism Organization of Iran

Khosrogerd Minaret (Persian: مناره خسروگرد) is a 12th-century tower located 10 kilometres (6.2 mi) to the west of Sabzevar, Iran, and is all that remains of the Silk Road town of Khosrogerd, destroyed in the Mongol invasion in 1220 AD. It is an example of Seljuk architecture.

The minaret was built around 1112 AD (in the 6th century AH) during the Seljuk era, and is almost 30 metres (98 ft) high.

== Gallery ==
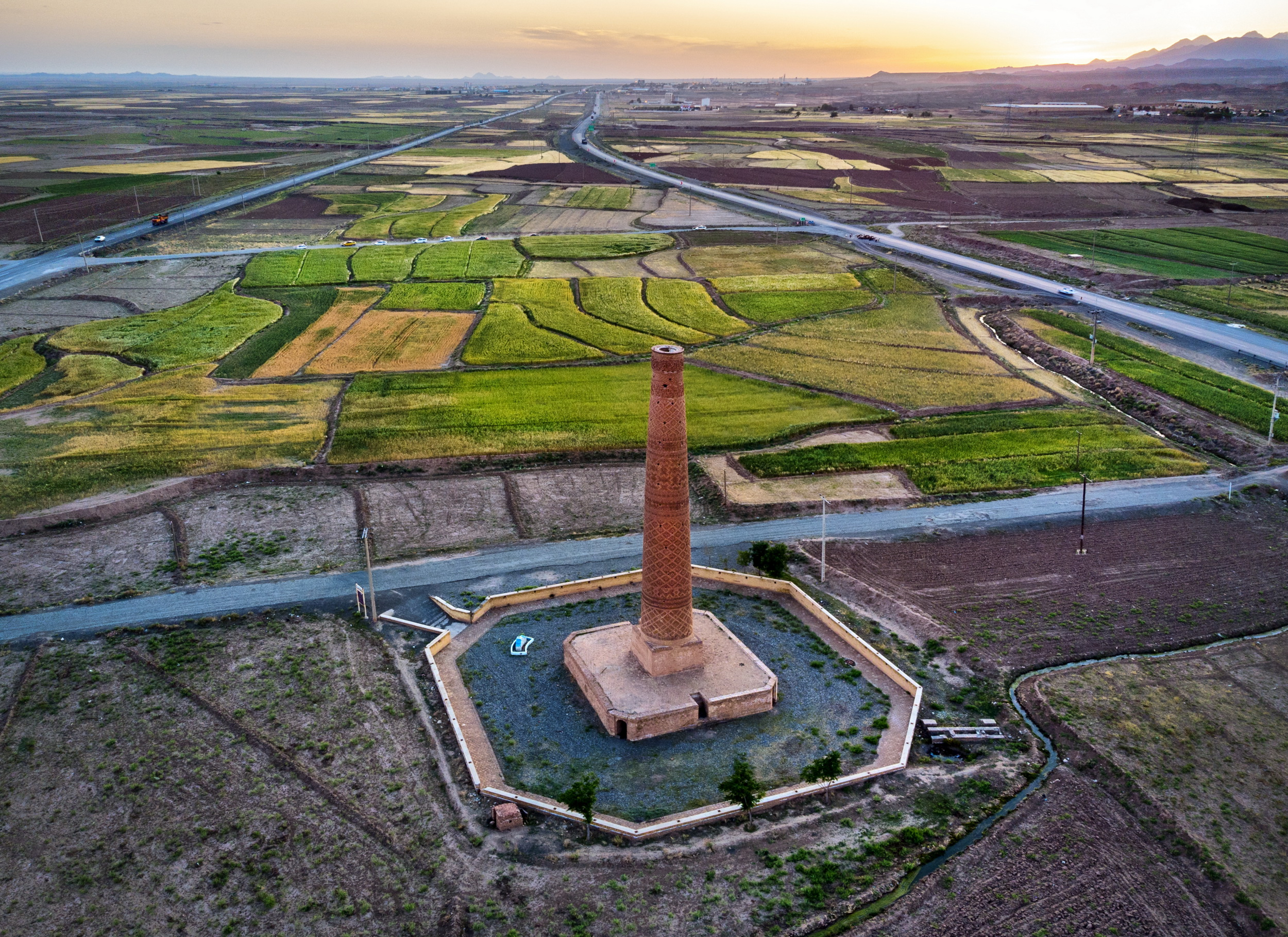
The minaret in 2021

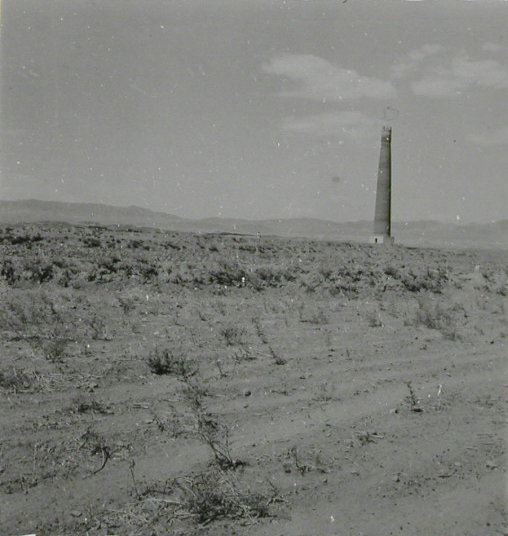
The minaret by Annemarie Schwarzenbach, c. 1940

== See also ==
- Architects of Iran
