= Shahrak District =

Shahrak شهرک
- District
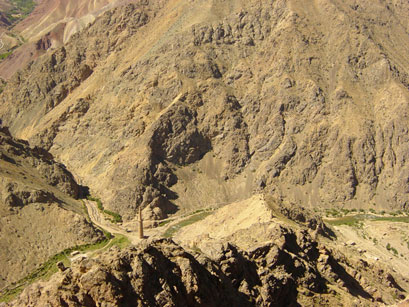
- The Minaret of Jam seen from overhead

- Location within Afghanistan
- Coordinates: 34°06′00″N 64°16′00″E
- Country: Afghanistan
- Province: Ghor
- Center: Dahan-e Falezak

Area
  - Total: 4,350 km^{2} (1,680 sq mi)
- Elevation: 2,350 m (7,710 ft)

Population (2012)
  - Total: 58,200

Shahrak District is located in the western part of Ghor province, Afghanistan. The population is 58,200. The district center is Dahan-e Falezak.

== Economy ==
The district suffers from a weak economy and severe poverty due to lack of road linkage between villages and district centre, low level of agriculture and livestock productions, inaccessibility to healthcare services and security problems. In 2014, construction work of irrigation projects began in five villages of the district by the Ministry of Rural Rehabilitation and Development (MRRD).

- Main handicrafts: rug weaving.
- Agricultural products: wheat, barley and potato.

== Architecture ==
Near the village of Jam stands the Minaret of Jam, a historic building.

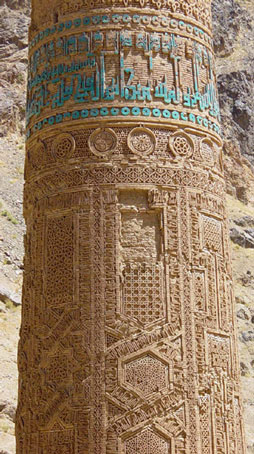
Minaret of Jam (close up)

== Climate ==
Shahrak features a mediterranean-influenced humid continental climate (Köppen: Dsb) with warm summers and cold, snowy winters.

Afghanistan’s lowest recorded temperature of −52.2 °C (−62.0 °F) was observed at Shahrak.

Climate data for Shahrak, elevation: 2,325 metres (7,628.0 ft)
Month	Jan	Feb	Mar	Apr	May	Jun	Jul	Aug	Sep	Oct	Nov	Dec	Year
Record high °C (°F)	9.8 (49.6)	16.3 (61.3)	24.1 (75.4)	24.7 (76.5)	31.0 (87.8)	34.6 (94.3)	36.2 (97.2)	34.4 (93.9)	29.9 (85.8)	26.2 (79.2)	19.1 (66.4)	15.2 (59.4)	36.2 (97.2)
Mean daily maximum °C (°F)	−1.5 (29.3)	−0.9 (30.4)	8.7 (47.7)	16.8 (62.2)	18.6 (65.5)	26.6 (79.9)	28.5 (83.3)	26.5 (79.7)	23.0 (73.4)	17.2 (63.0)	9.7 (49.5)	3.9 (39.0)	14.8 (58.6)
Daily mean °C (°F)	−8.0 (17.6)	−8.5 (16.7)	2.2 (36.0)	9.4 (48.9)	10.5 (50.9)	16.8 (62.2)	18.4 (65.1)	16.1 (61.0)	12.0 (53.6)	7.8 (46.0)	1.6 (34.9)	−3.3 (26.1)	6.3 (43.3)
Mean daily minimum °C (°F)	−14.5 (5.9)	−16.0 (3.2)	−4.3 (24.3)	1.9 (35.4)	2.3 (36.1)	7.0 (44.6)	8.2 (46.8)	5.6 (42.1)	0.9 (33.6)	−1.6 (29.1)	−6.6 (20.1)	−10.5 (13.1)	−2.3 (27.9)
Record low °C (°F)	−52.2 (−62.0)	−46.1 (−51.0)	−22.0 (−7.6)	−6.0 (21.2)	−5.0 (23.0)	2.0 (35.6)	3.0 (37.4)	0.0 (32.0)	−3.0 (26.6)	−8.0 (17.6)	−18.0 (−0.4)	−29.0 (−20.2)	−52.2 (−62.0)
Average precipitation mm (inches)	53.6 (2.11)	68.2 (2.69)	83.0 (3.27)	59.3 (2.33)	35.7 (1.41)	10.4 (0.41)	3.7 (0.15)	5.6 (0.22)	0.3 (0.01)	6.8 (0.27)	20.4 (0.80)	42.8 (1.69)	389.8 (15.36)
Average relative humidity (%)	61.4	62.2	59.7	55.0	45.7	34.0	31.4	31.2	32.6	39.6	46.4	57.6	46.4
Source 1: Meteo-Climat
Source 2: Weatherbase (Precipitation & Humidity), The Prediction Of Worldwide Energy Resources (Record High (1990-2021))
