= Minaret of Jam =

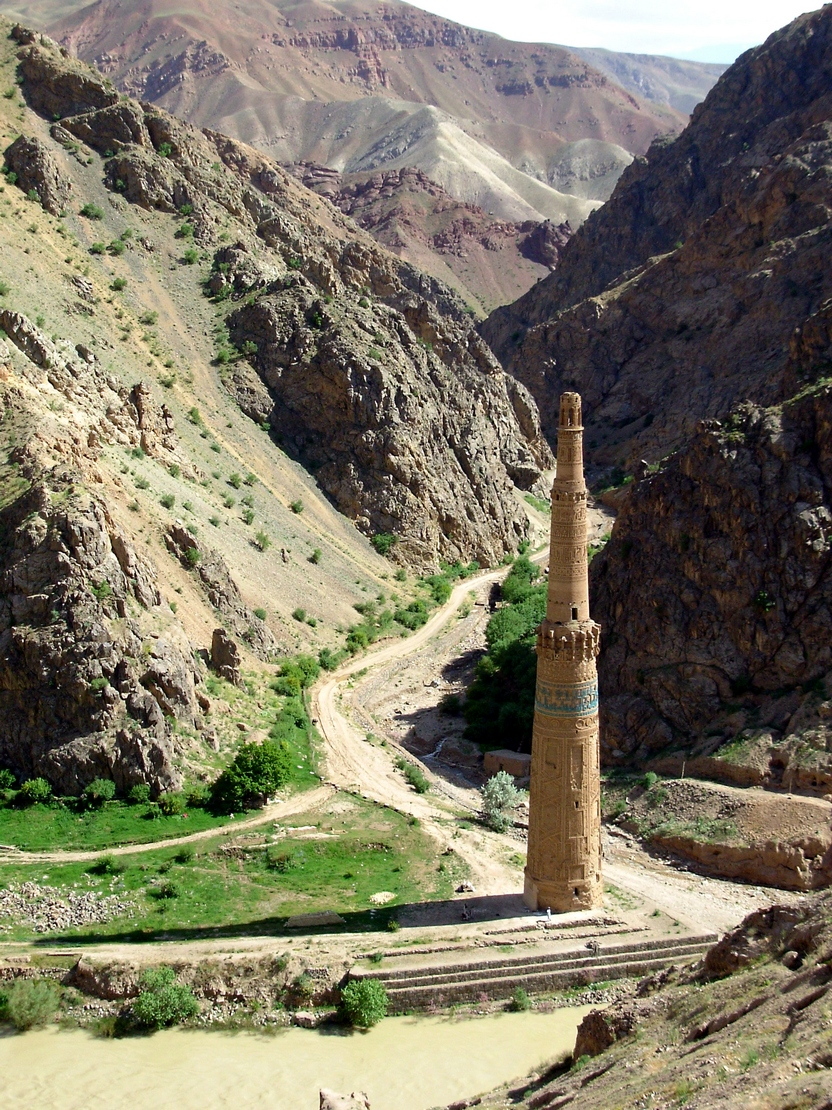

- Location within Afghanistan
- 34°23′47.6″N 64°30′57.8″E
- Type: Minaret
- Location: Shahrak District, Ghor Province, Afghanistan

History
- Built: c. 1190

Site notes
- Height: 65 m (213 ft)

UNESCO World Heritage Site
- Official name: Minaret and Archaeological Remains of Jam
- Type: Cultural
- Criteria: (ii), (iii), (iv)
- Designated: 2002 (26th session)
- Reference no.: 211
- Region: Central Asia
- Endangered: 2002–...

The Minaret of Jam (Pashto: د جام منار, Dari: منار جام) is a UNESCO World Heritage Site in western Afghanistan. It is located in a remote and nearly inaccessible region of Shahrak District, Ghor Province, between the Jam and Hari Rivers. The 62 m (203 ft) or 65 m (213 ft) high minaret was built c. 1190, entirely of baked bricks, and is famous for its intricate brick, stucco and glazed tile decoration, which consists of alternating bands of Kufic and Naskhi calligraphy, geometric patterns, and verses from the Qur'an. Since 2002, the minaret has remained on the list of World Heritage in Danger, under serious threat of erosion, and has not been actively preserved. In 2014, the BBC reported that the tower was in imminent danger of collapse.

In 2020, the Minaret of Jam was listed among cultural heritage sites of the Islamic world by the Islamic World Educational, Scientific and Cultural Organization (ICESCO). According to the Afghan Ministry of Foreign Affairs (MoFA), the Minaret of Jam is Afghanistan's first cultural heritage site to be listed by ICESCO.

== Etymology ==
The word minaret is Arabic [منارة] and usually means a tower next to a mosque from which the muezzin calls the faithful to prayer. However it also means lighthouse and has other meanings. Here, it is used loosely.

== Architecture ==
The Minaret of Jam measures at 65 meters (210 feet) and is made out of baked brick, stucco, terracotta, and turquoise glazed tiles, with its exterior decorated with floral and geometric designs. Inscribed on the eastern face of the tower is executed in ornamental angular Kufi script except for the cursive script of the architect, Ahmad ibn Ibrahim al-Naysaburi. On the top of the tower is a gallery Inside the structure there is a central pillar with double spiral staircases, both have 159 steps leading up to the two wooden balconies. Each of the steps consists of four courses that have additional four or five baked bricks that are arranged horizontally. The steps at the bottom are 4.59 feet (1.4) wide and ascending at the summit they are 3.28 feet (1.0) wide and are alternatively keyed into the tower's central pillar and its exterior. Both the central pillar and the staircases terminate at the landing, followed by a series of six vaulted brick platforms above. On the outside of tower, there are inscribed texts in angular square Kufi script with text from the Quran. Also on it, there are ribbon like and strands of intersecting rhomboidal knots that alternate with each other.

== Site ==
The Minaret of Jaam is probably located at the site of the Ghurid dynasty's capital, Firozkoh.

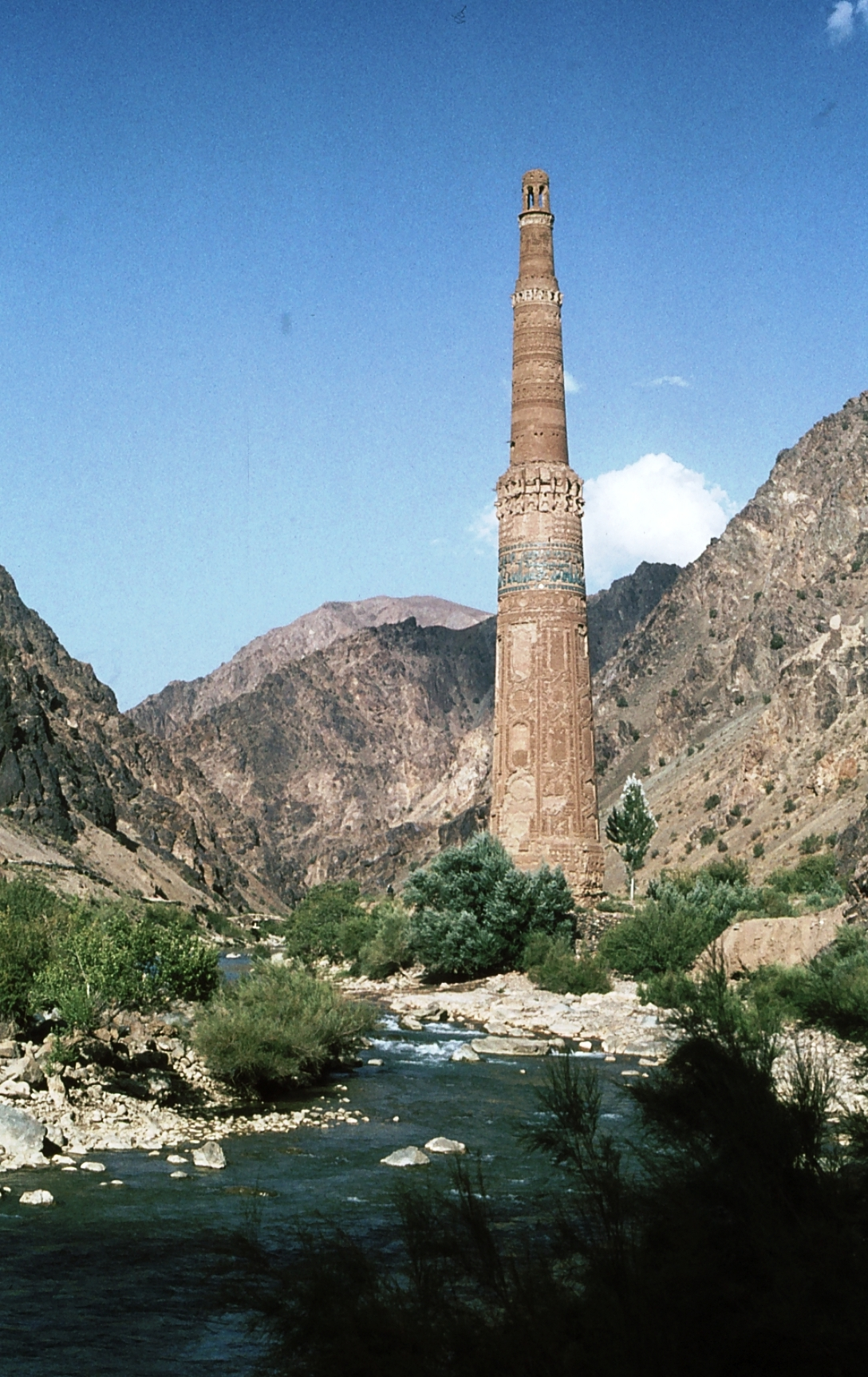
Film photograph of the minaret and surrounding landscape

The circular minaret rests on an octagonal base; it had 2 wooden balconies and was topped by a lantern. The Minaret itself is made out of baked brick, stucco, terracotta, and turquoise glazed tiles, with its exterior decorated with floral and geometric designs. Inside the structure there is a central pillar with double spiral staircases, both have 159 steps leading up to the two balconies. Each step consists of four courses that have additional four or five baked bricks that are arranged horizontal. The steps at the bottom are 4.59 feet (1.4) wide and at the summit they are 3.28 feet (1.0) wide and are alternatively keyed into the tower's central pillar Its formal presentation has a striking similarity to the Ghazni minarets built by Masud III. It is thought to have been a direct inspiration for the Qutub Minar in Delhi, India.

The Minaret of Jam belongs to a group of around 60 minarets and towers built between the 11th and the 13th centuries in Central Asia, Iran and Afghanistan, including the Kutlug Timur Minaret in Old Urgench (long considered the tallest of these still in existence). The minarets are thought to have been built as symbols of Islam's victory, while other towers were simply landmarks or watchtowers. However, the main theme Koranic verses inscribed to the minaret is Mary or the Virgin mother of Jesus who is a figure also revered in Islam and there has been some evidence that the tower was perhaps commissioned by a noble woman in the Ghurid Dynasty.

The archaeological landscape around Jam includes the ruins of a 'palace', fortifications, a pottery kiln and a Jewish cemetery, and has been suggested to be the remains of the lost city of Turquoise Mountain. Analysis of the "robber holes" around the site, high-resolution satellite images and data from Google Maps has led to an estimate that the Ghūrid summer capital around the minaret was about 19.5 hectares in size.

The archaeological site of Jam was successfully nominated as Afghanistan's first World Heritage site in 2002. It was also inscribed in UNESCO's list of World Heritage in Danger, due to the precarious state of preservation of the minaret, and the results of looting at the site.

According to archaeologists, a Jewish cemetery was also discovered 10 kilometers away from the minaret including remains from a military building, a palace and pottery jars.

== History ==
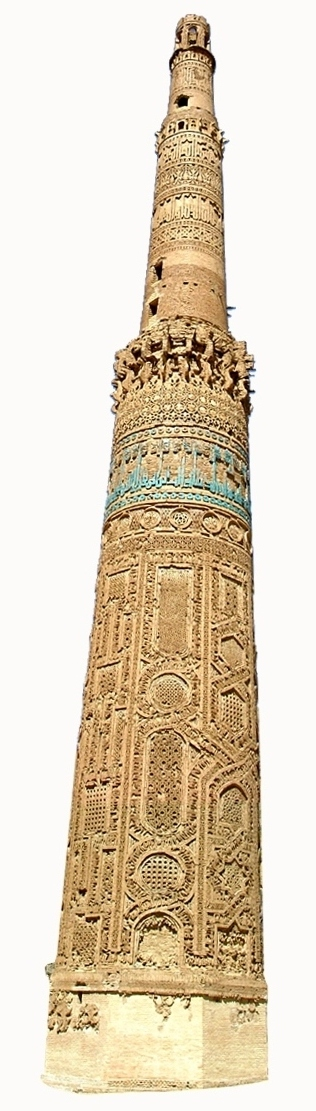
Jam minaret

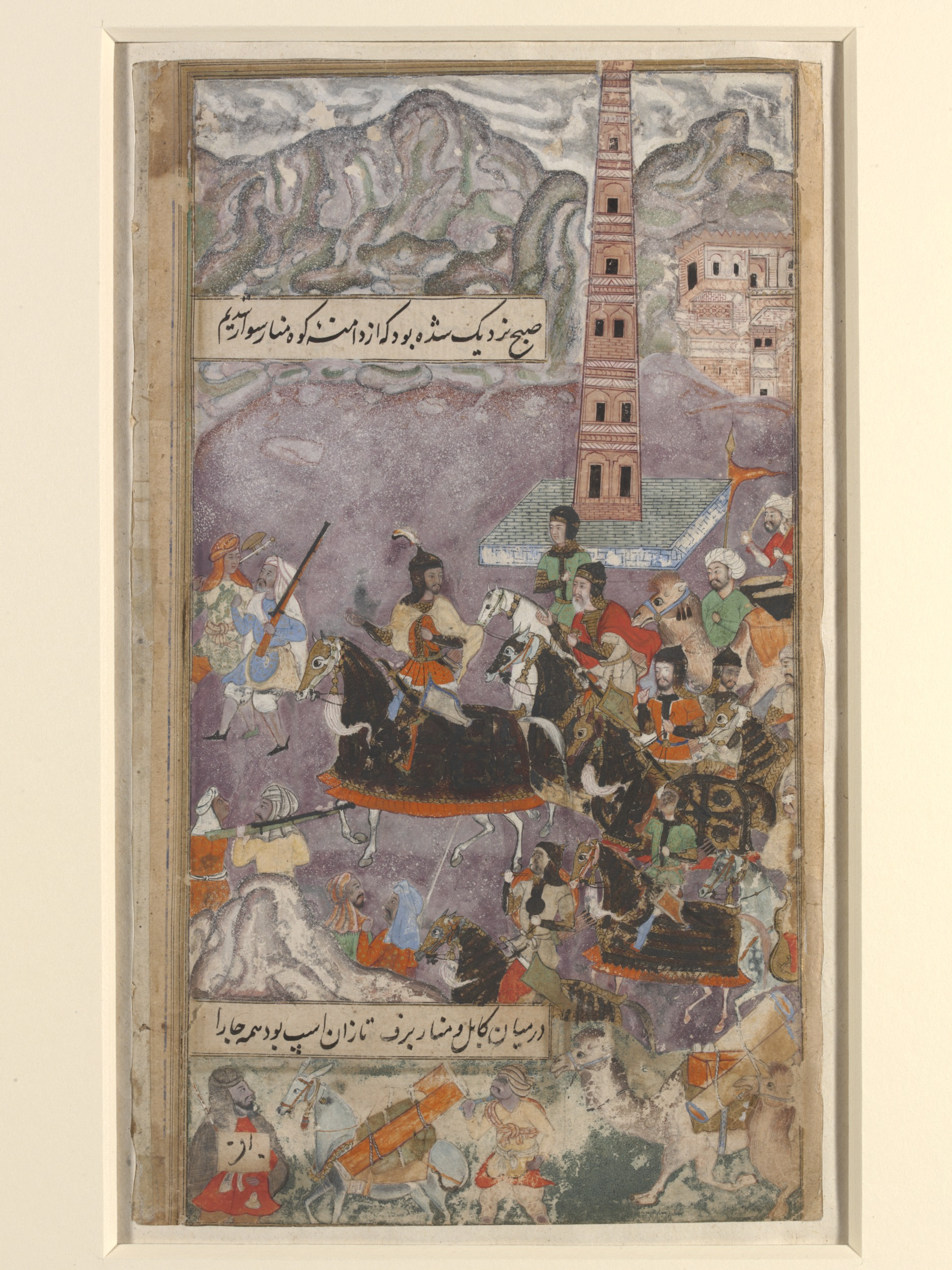
Timurid conqueror Babur advances through Jam and the mountains to Kabul.

During the 12th and 13th century, the Ghurids controlled what is now Afghanistan, but also parts of eastern Iran, Central Asia, Northern India and parts of Pakistan.

The Arabic inscription dating the minaret is unclear – it could read 1193/4 or 1174/5 when converted to Gregorian dates. It could thus commemorate the victory of the Ghurid sultan Ghiyas ud-Din over the Ghaznavids in 1186 in Lahore. However, Ralph Pinder-Wilson, a British Archeologist and Director of the British Institute of Afghan Studies in the 1970s, wrote a major study of the Minarets of Jam and Ghazni in which he expressed his belief that the minaret was built to commemorate the victory of Mu'izz ad-Din, Ghiyath ud-Din's brother, over Prithviraj Chauhan. This victory allowed Islam to spread into the northern Indian subcontinent. Pinder-Wilson believed that the minaret was built in the style of the time, which included a tradition of early Islamic victory towers proclaiming the conquering power of Islam.

It is assumed that the Minaret was attached to the Friday Mosque of Firozkoh, which the Ghurid chronicler Minhaj-i Siraj Juzjani states was washed away in a flash flood, some time before the Mongol sieges in the early 13th century. Work at Jam by the Minaret of Jam Archaeological Project has found evidence of a large courtyard building beside the minaret, and evidence of river sediments on top of the baked-brick paving.

The Ghurid Empire's glory waned after the death of Ghiyath ud-Din in 1202, as it was forced to cede territory to the Khwarazm Empire. Juzjani states that Firuzkuh was destroyed by the Mongols in 1222.

The Minaret was little known outside of Afghanistan until Sir Thomas Holdich reported it in 1886 while working for the Afghan Boundary Commission. It did not come to world attention, however, until 1957 through the work of the French archaeologists André Maricq and Gaston Wiet. Later, Werner Herberg conducted limited surveys around the site in the 1970s, and Ralph Pinder-Wilson completed his major study of the site in the same decade, before the Soviet invasion of 1979 once again cut off outside access.

== Inscriptional content ==
- The uppermost band consists of the Muslim confession of faith, the shahada; "I bear witness there is no god but Allah (and that) Muhammad is the messenger of Allah."
- Below this, are upper two bands that consists of verse 13, surat al-Saff LXI;"Help from Allah and present victory. Give good tidings (O Muhammad) to believers. O ye who believe."
- The band below this consists of names and titles of Ghiyath ad-Din Muhammad bin Sam
- Located below this is a band containing an amplified version of Ghiyath ad-Din Muhammad's names and titles in turquoise mosaic tiles.
- An oblong hexagon with two lines of naskhi underneath, (1)"The work of 'Ali ibn...", (2)undeciphered
- An inscription, "Abu'l-Fath", heavily damaged, due to being made of stucco.
- Interlaced bands consisting of surat Maryam XIX.
- Facing north is a Kufic inscription, "On the date of the year five hundred ninety"(equivalent of 27 December 1193 to 16 December 1194).

== Conservation issues ==
=== Threats ===
The Minaret of Jam is threatened by erosion, water infiltration and floods, due to its proximity to the Hari and Jam rivers. Another threat is the earthquakes that happen frequently in the region. As a result of these issues, the tower has been deteriorating and slowly tilting.

Following his 2002 visit, British explorer and future Member of Parliament Rory Stewart reported that looters and illegal excavations had also damaged the archaeological site surrounding the minaret.

On 21 July 2018 Pajhwok News reported Taliban clashes with local forces at checkpoints near the Minaret of Jam in a 6-hour long skirmish. The militants set the forests surrounding the historic district on fire, damaging a mosque. Ghor Director of Culture and Information Fakhruddin Ariapoor expressed concern at the instability in the area, stating that some parts of the green area were damaged; and although the minaret remained intact, warned that if the central government did not pay due attention to the security of the site, the militants would destroy it.

On January 17, 2022, an earthquake struck western Afghanistan, killing 28 people. The earthquake caused bricks to fall from the tower and it has since been at an even greater risk of collapsing.

Threats to the integrity of the structure, including the risk of collapse, have been reported multiple times in recent years due to severe flooding, including in 2014, 2019, and 2024.

=== Restoration efforts ===
Stabilisation work was started and carried out in the 1970s, but then lapsed. Work resumed after 2001, but was reported to have stopped again by 2008.

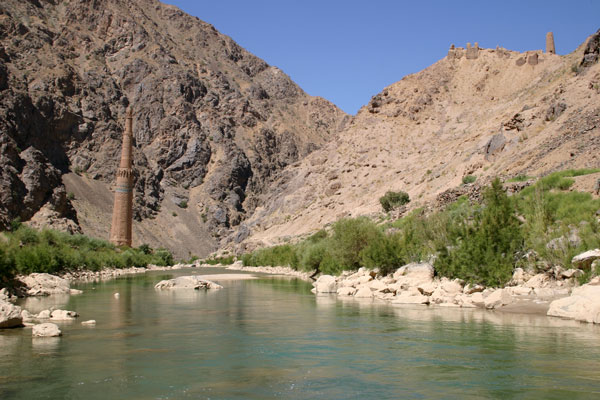
The Minaret of Jam and Qasr Zarafshan melt into the rugged surrounding landscape – August 2005

UNESCO has tried to launch assessment programs. In 2012 UNESCO outlined plans for 3D scanning, hydraulic measurements, and strengthening of support beams and walls to maintain the Minaret, and photos of the external structure have been taken to provide models for future reconstruction. Although the 3D modelling of the minaret was finally carried out for UNESCO by Iconem, political instability has led to a lack of funding and no maintenance efforts have been conducted. Furthermore, the surrounding terrain has made it difficult to make any progress of the structure as it impedes access. However, these assessments have provided a strong basis for future maintenance. While fieldwork remains difficult, archaeologists have analyzed satellite images and data from Google Maps to make new discoveries about the minaret and the surrounding site.

In December 2024, the local governor of Ghor announced that consolidation works, including the construction of retaining walls, would soon begin, following the damage done by recent floods. It was reported in March 2025 that the retaining walls were completed after 50 days of work. However, some experts indicate that more drastic efforts would be needed to prevent long term deterioration.

== Gallery ==
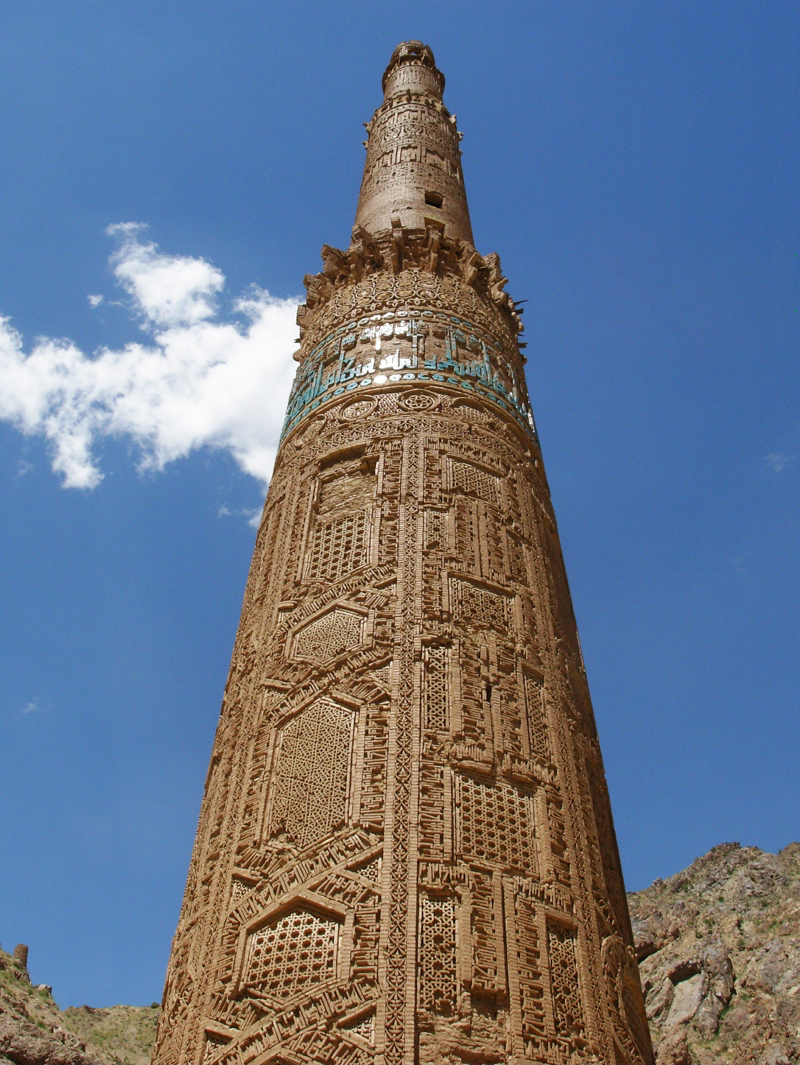
Minaret of Jam, Decorative inscriptions on the exterior

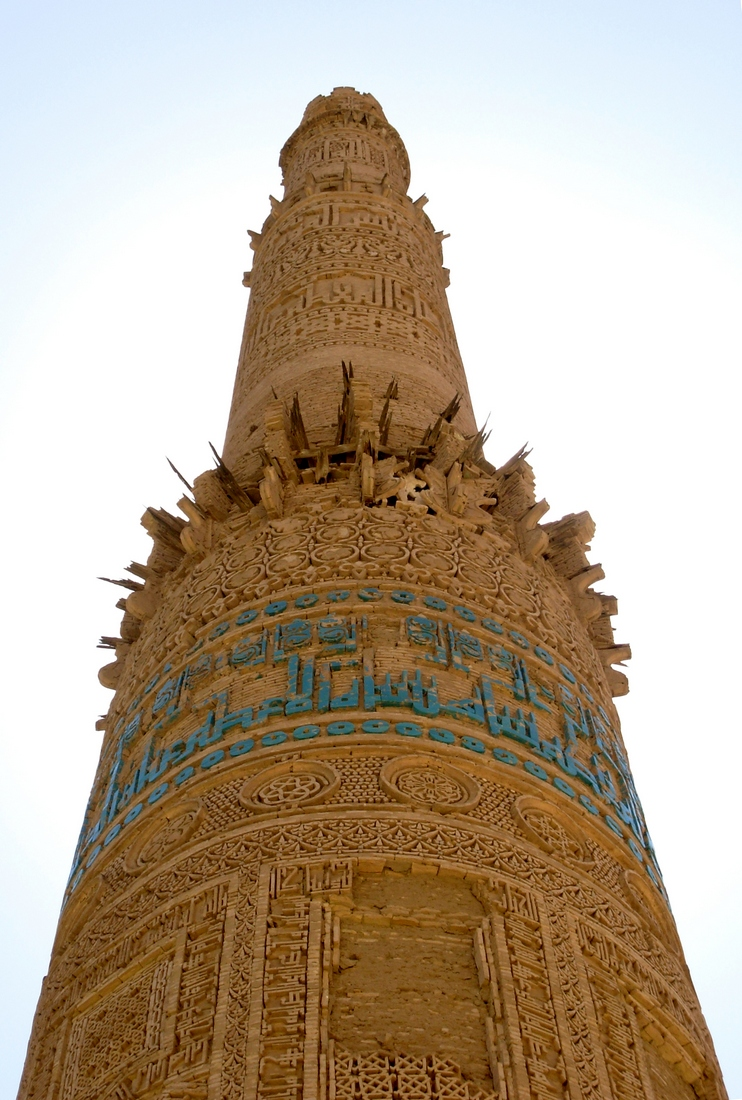
Minaret of Jam, detail view

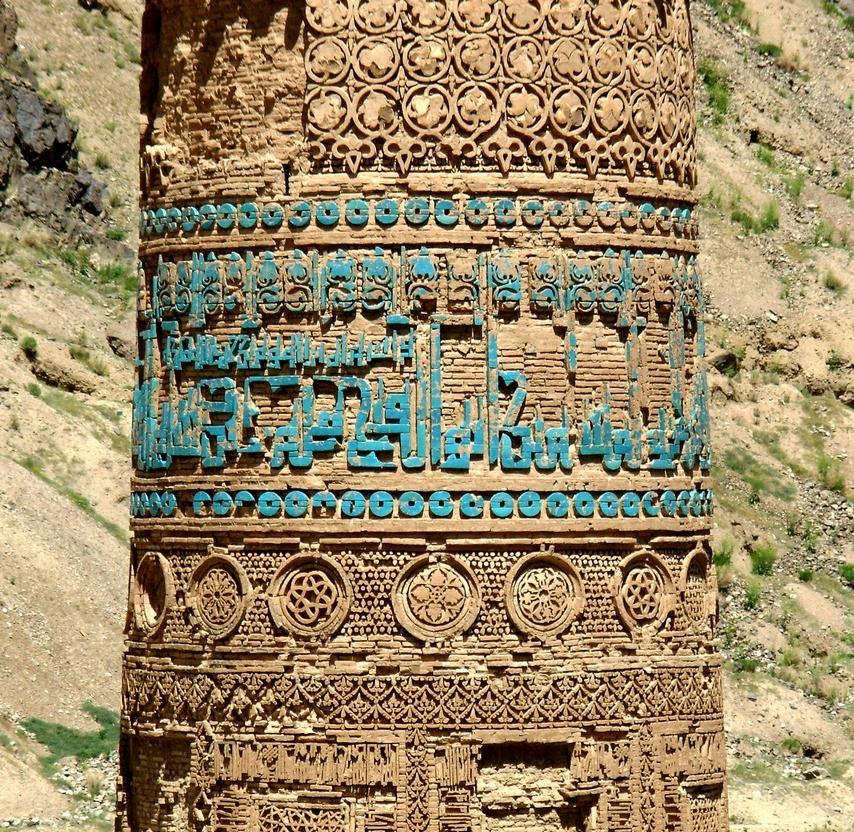
Minaret of Jam, part of decorative exterior inscription

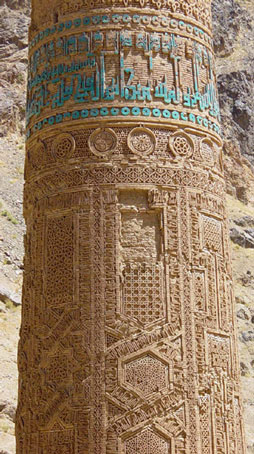
Decorated exterior of the Minaret of Jam, August 2005

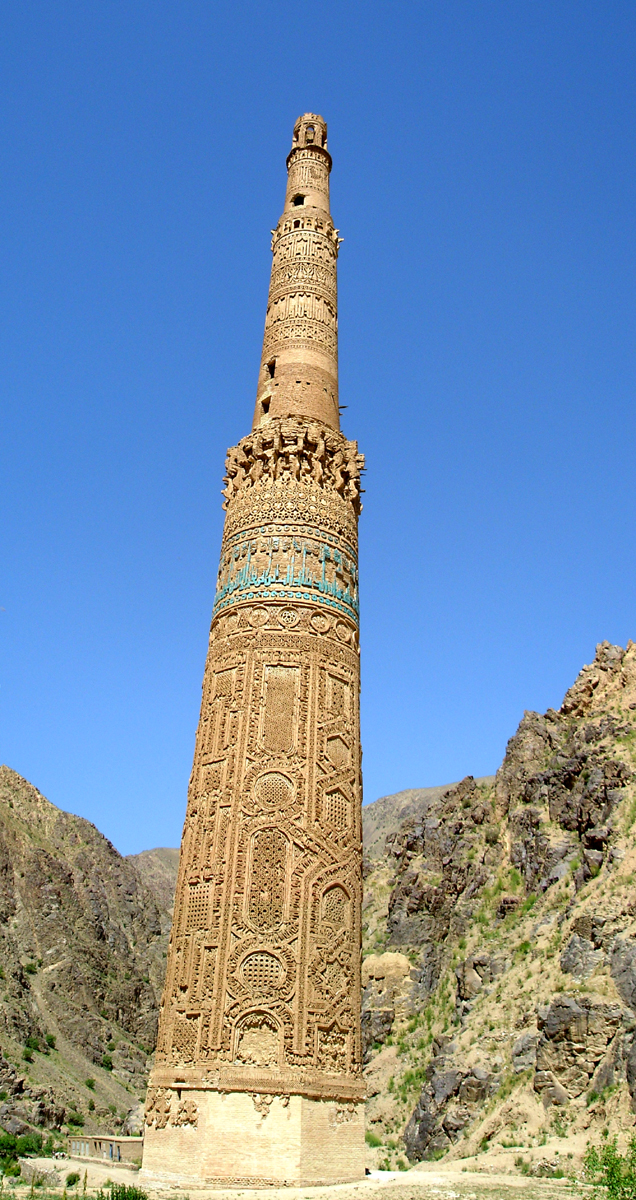
Minaret of Jam, with design influenced by Karramiyya

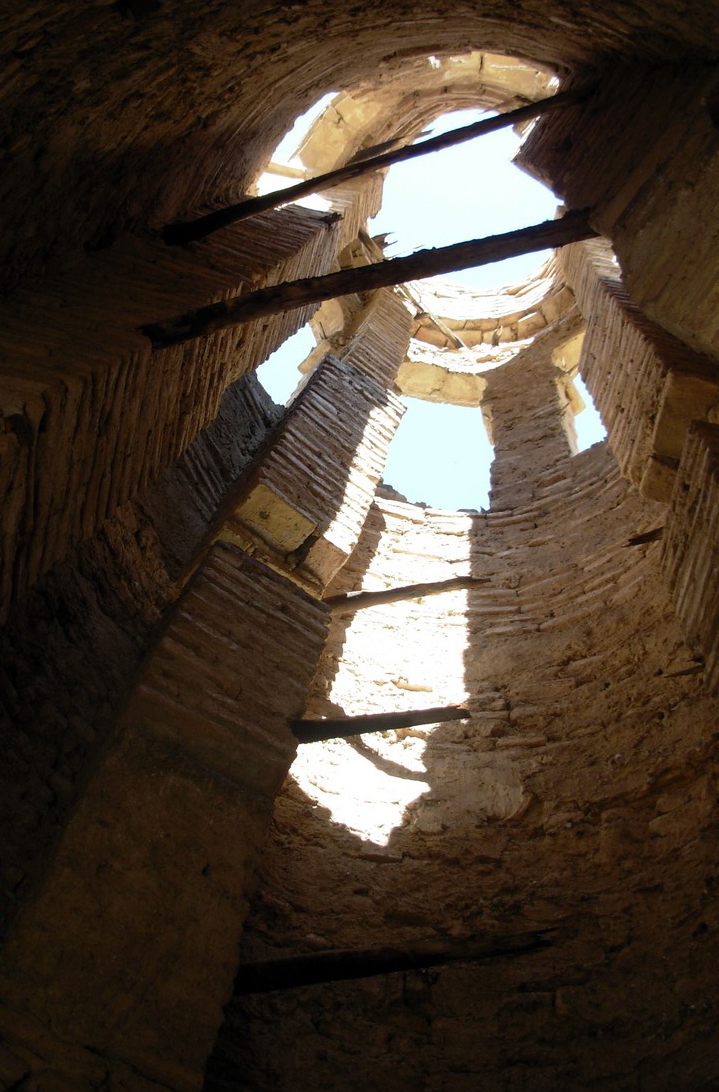
Minaret of Jam – interior

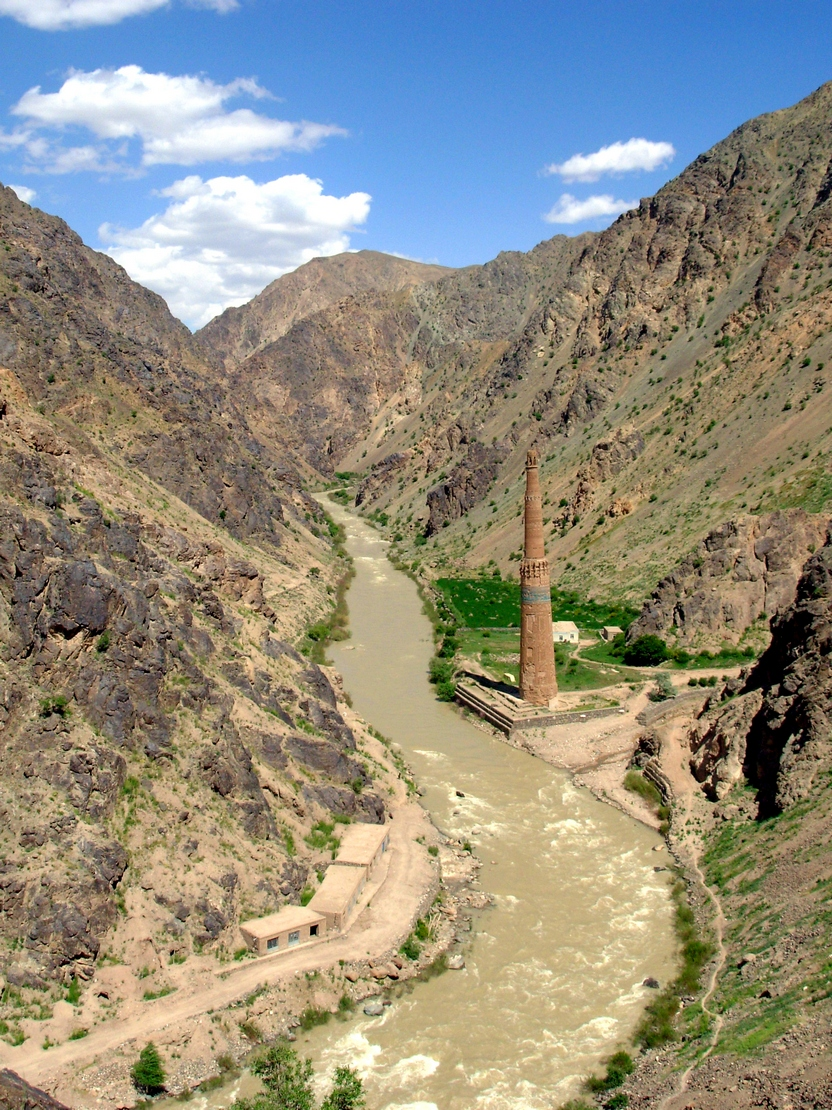
Minaret of Jam on the bank of the Hari Rud River

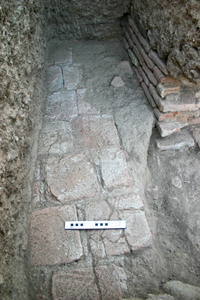
Baked-brick courtyard paving near the Minaret of Jam, August 2005

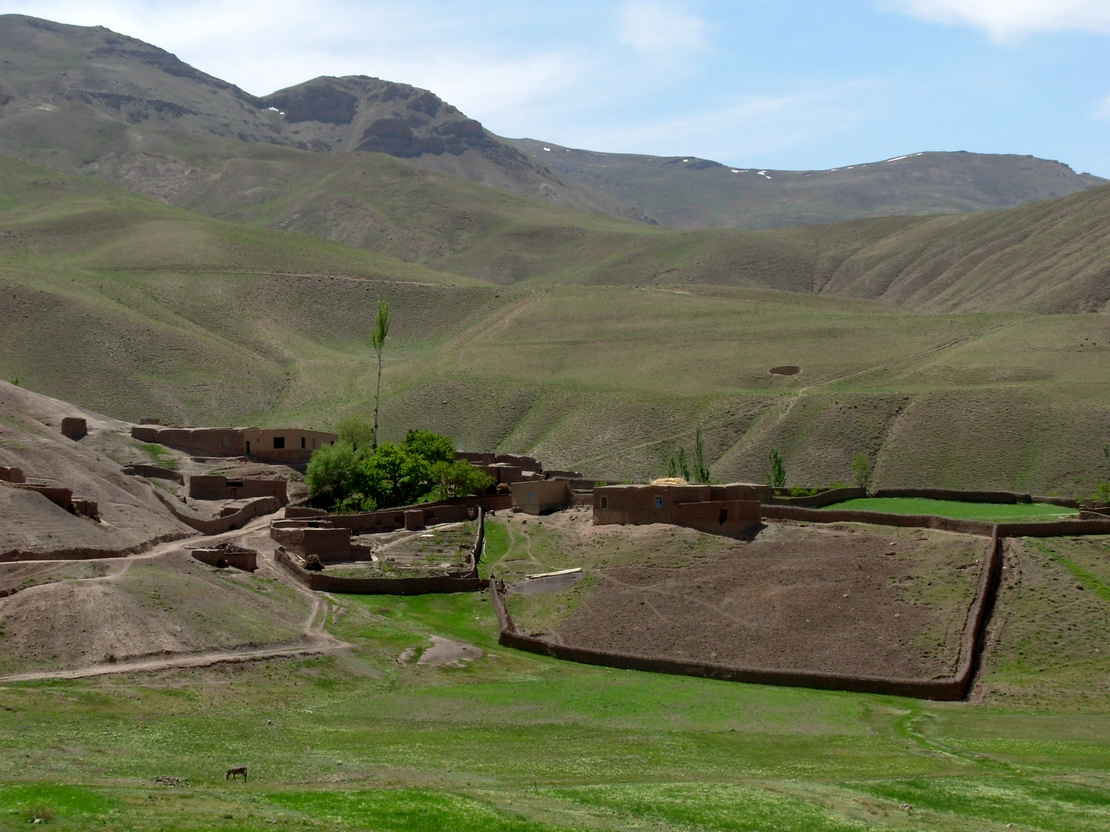
Farmstead on the way to the minaret

== See also ==
- Ghazni Minarets
- Musalla Minarets of Herat
- List of tallest structures built before the 20th century
