= Kutlug Timur Minaret =

Minaret in Konye-Urgench in north Turkmenistan

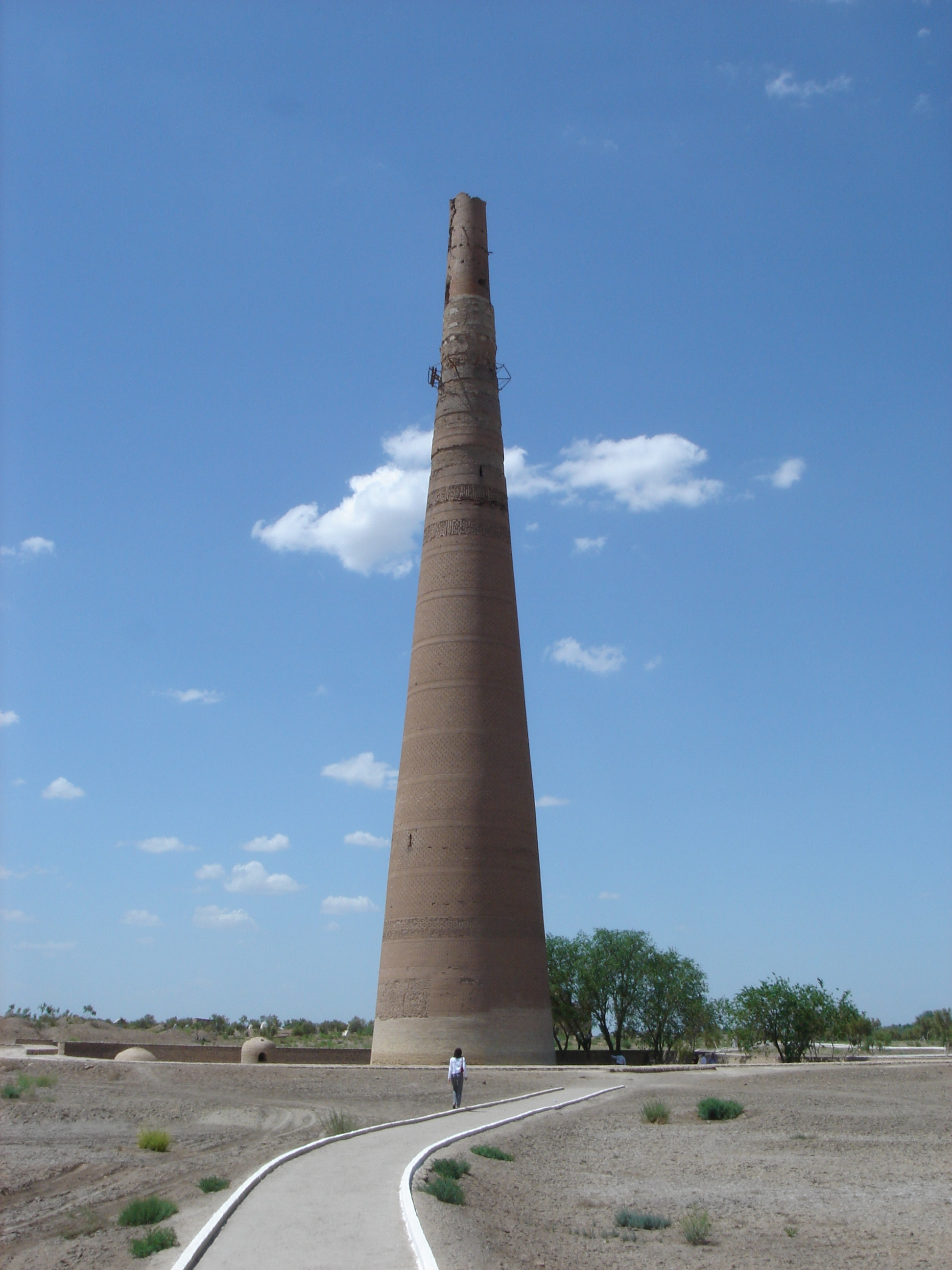
- Kutlug Timur Minaret as seen in May 2006

- Location within Turkmenistan
- 42°20′N 59°09′E
- Type: Monument
- Periods: Khwarazmian dynasty
- Cultures: Khwarezm
- Location: Konye-Urgench, Daşoguz Province, Turkmenistan

History
- Built: 1011 AD

Site notes
- Height: 60 m (200 ft)
- Condition: Ruined

UNESCO World Heritage Site
- Official name: Kunya-Urgench
- Type: Cultural
- Criteria: ii, iii
- Designated: 2005 (29th session)
- Reference no.: 1199
- Region: Asia and Australasia

Kutlug Timur minaret is a minaret in Konye-Urgench in north Turkmenistan, Central Asia. Constructed in 1011 during the Khwarazmian dynasty, the minaret stands at a height of 60 meters, with a base diameter of 12 meters and a top diameter of 2 meters. In 2005, the ruins of Old Urgench, where the minaret is situated, were inscribed on the UNESCO List of World Heritage Sites.

The Kutlug Timur Minaret is part of a group of approximately 60 minarets and towers constructed between the 11th and 13th centuries across Central Asia, Iran, and Afghanistan. Notable among these is the Minaret of Jam in Afghanistan.

On the basis of its decorative brickwork, including Kufic inscriptions, the minaret is thought to be an earlier construction but was restored by Kutlug-Timur around 1330.

== Gallery ==
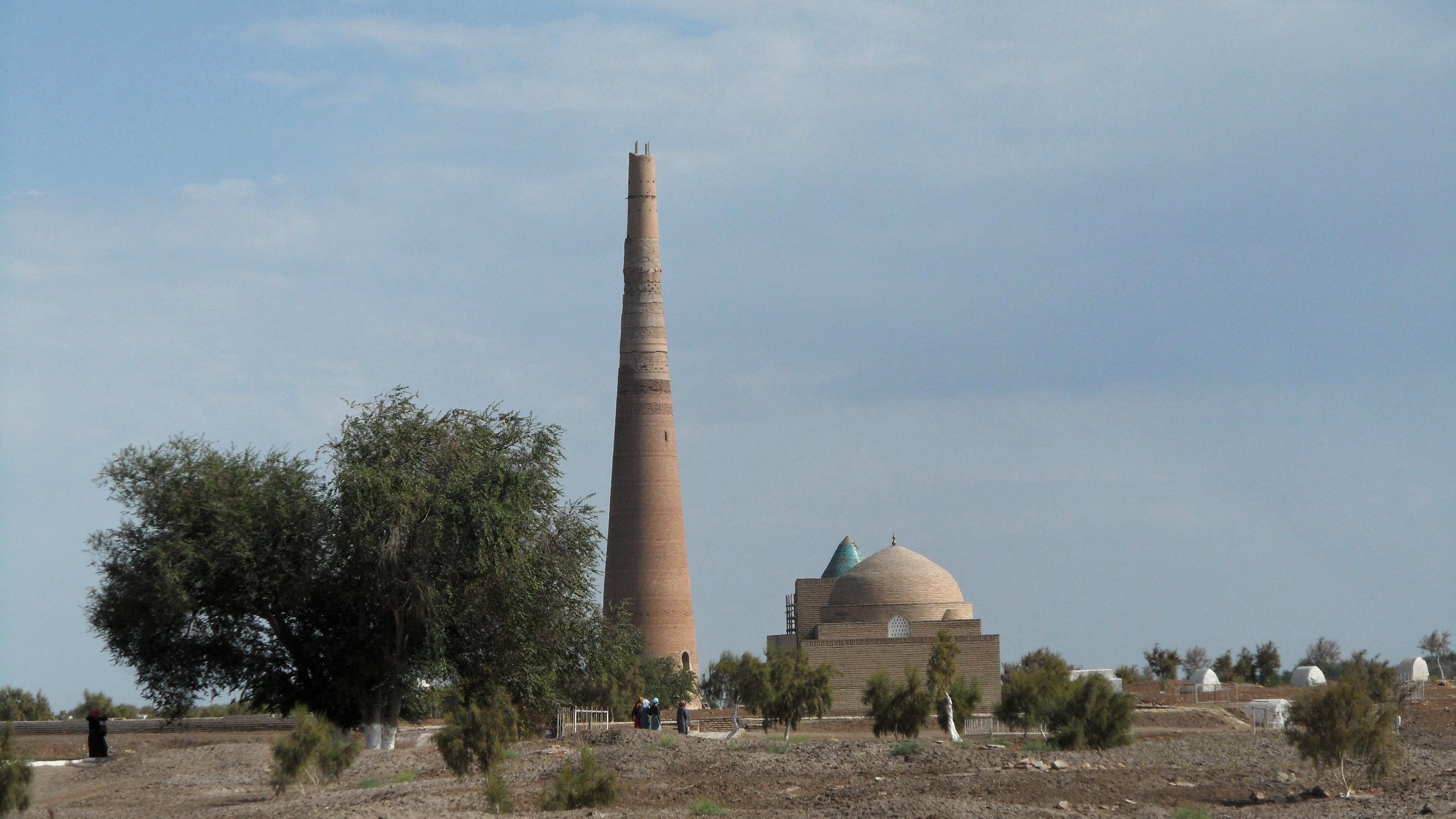
kutlug-Timur-Minaret with Konye Urgentch ruins in September 2011.

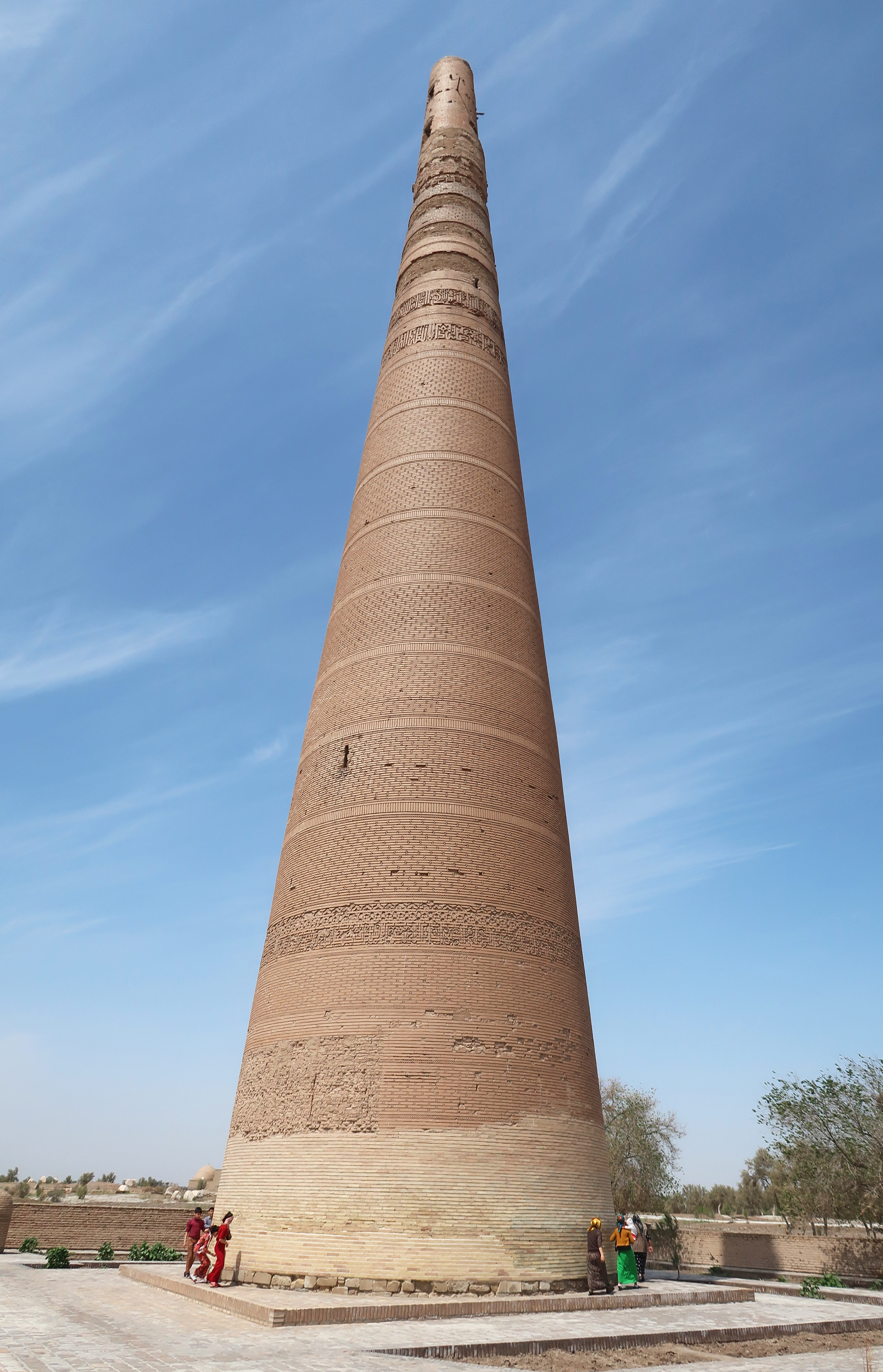

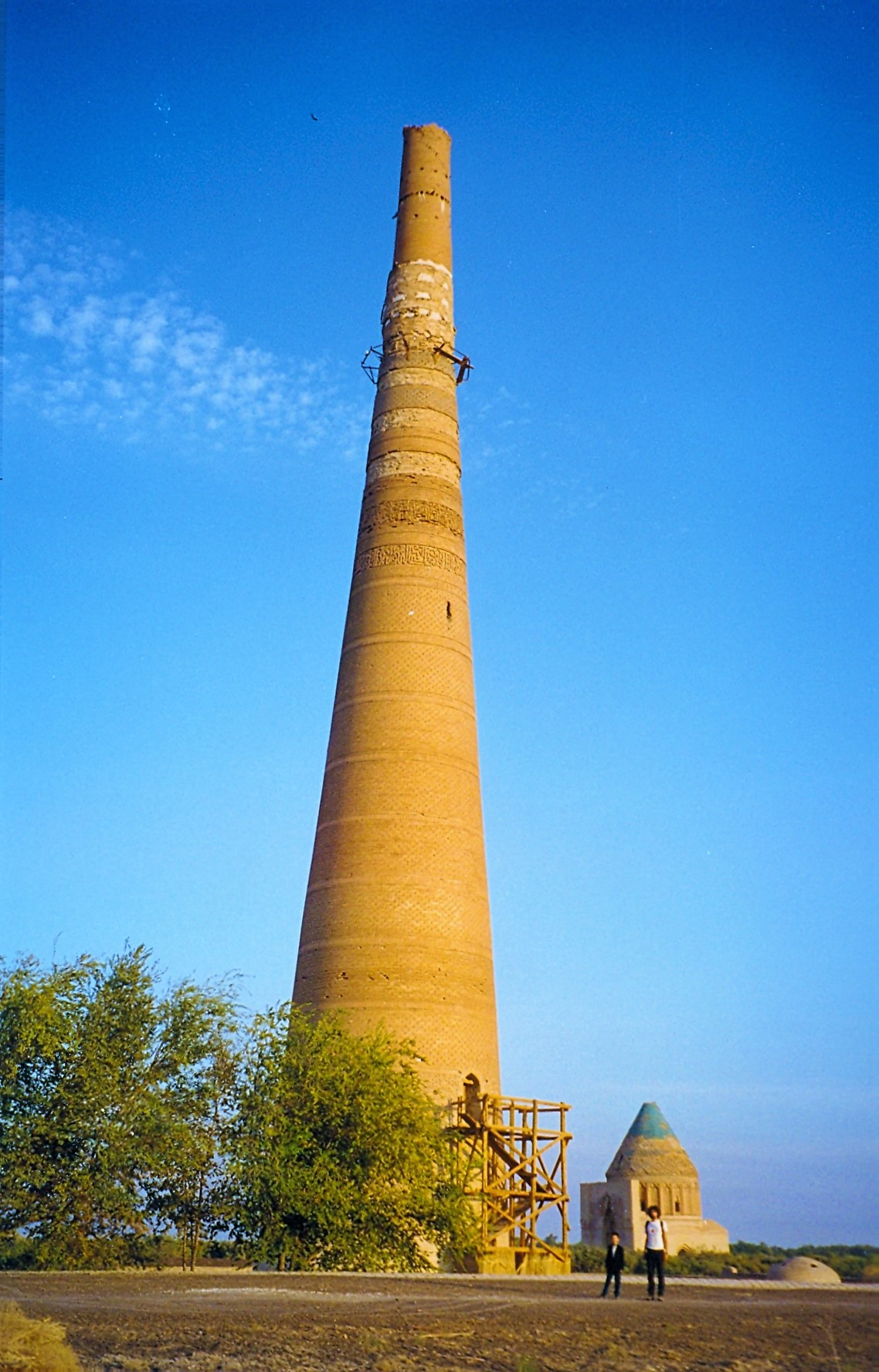

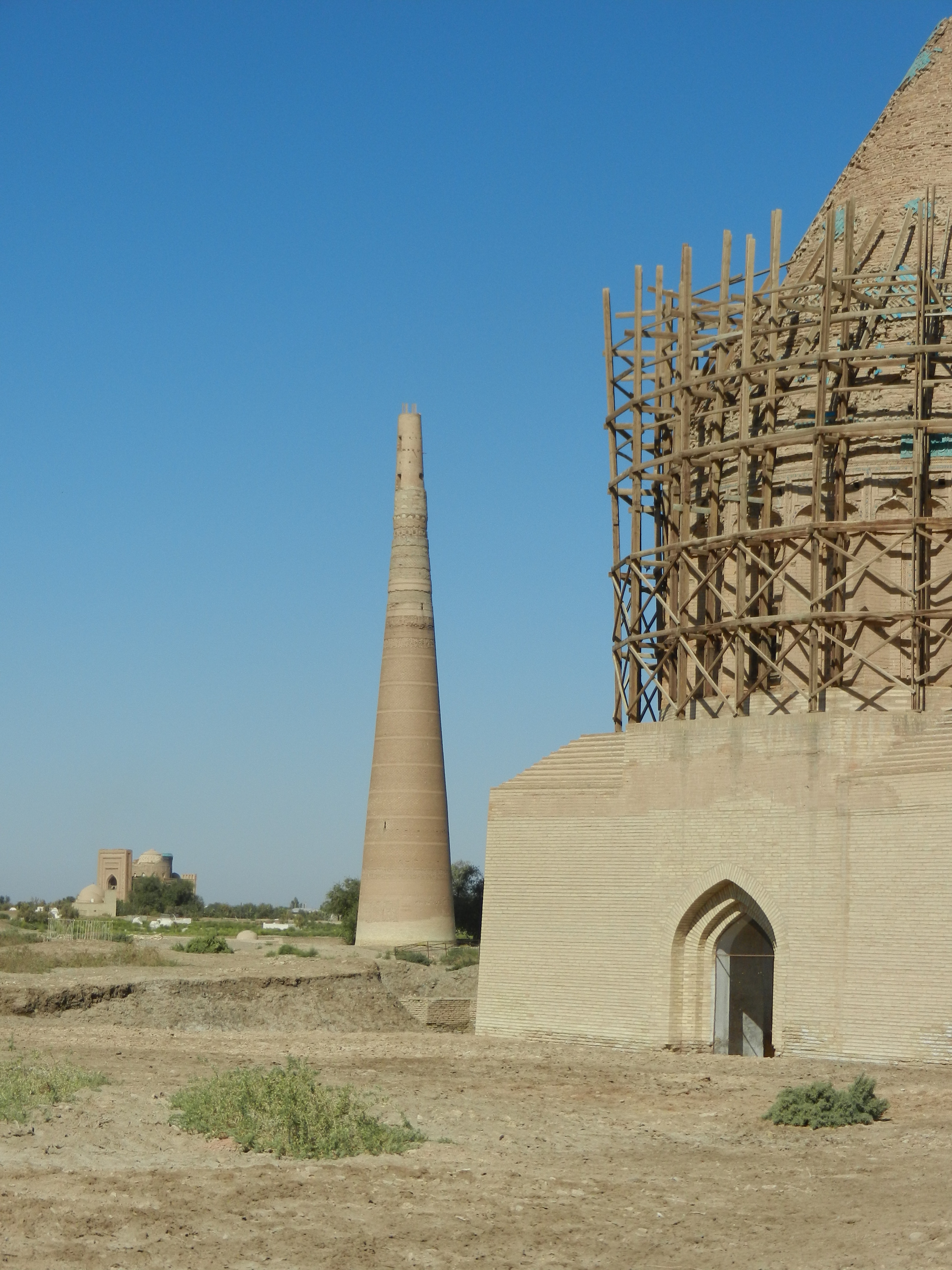

== See also ==
- Minaret
- List of tallest minarets
- List of World Heritage Sites in Turkmenistan
