= List of tallest mosques =

A list of the 25 tallest mosques in the world. The height value gives the height of the tallest element of the mosque (usually a minaret).

== List ==
	Name	Country	City	Height m (ft)	Year of completion	Remarks
1	Djamaa el Djazaïr	Algeria	Algiers	265 m (869 ft)	2019	
2	Hassan II Mosque	Morocco	Casablanca	210 m (690 ft)	1993	
3	Sultan Salahuddin Abdul Aziz Mosque	Malaysia	Shah Alam	142.3 m (467 ft)	1988	106.7 m (350 ft) high dome
4	Great Mosque of Mecca	Saudi Arabia	Mecca	139 m (456 ft)	1570	
5	Grand Mosalla mosque of Tehran	Iran	Tehran	136 m (446 ft)	2006	Unfinished as of 2019
6	Al Fateh Grand Mosque	Bahrain	Manama	130.1 m (427 ft)	1988	
7	Putra Mosque	Malaysia	Putrajaya	116 m (381 ft)	1999	
8	Sheikh Zayed Grand Mosque	United Arab Emirates	Abu Dhabi	115 m (377 ft)	2008	
9	Mosque of Sheikh Ibrahim Al-Ibrahim	Venezuela	Caracas	113 m (371 ft)	1989	
10	Al-Masjid an-Nabawi	Saudi Arabia	Medina	112 m (367 ft)	1994	
11	Al-Nour Mosque	Egypt	Cairo	111.9 m (367 ft)		
12	Grand Mosalla mosque of Isfahan	Iran	Isfahan	110 m (360 ft)	2010	
13	Çamlıca Republic Mosque	Turkey	Istanbul	107.1 m (351 ft)	2016	
14	The Grand Mosque	United Arab Emirates	Dubai	107 m (351 ft)	2007	
15	Sabancı Merkez Mosque	Turkey	Adana	99 m (325 ft)	1998	
16	Jameh Mosque of Makki	Iran	Zahedan	92 m (302 ft)	2010	
17	Sultan Qaboos Grand Mosque	Oman	Muscat	91.3 m (300 ft)	2001	
18	Mausoleum of Ruhollah Khomeini	Iran	Tehran	91 m (299 ft)	1992	
19	Faisal Mosque	Pakistan	Islamabad	90 m (300 ft)	1987	
20	Kocatepe Mosque	Turkey	Ankara	88 m (289 ft)	1987	
21	Abdülhamid Han Mosque	Turkey	Kahramanmaras	88 m (289 ft)		
22	Maltepe Merkez Mosque	Turkey	Istanbul	87 m (285 ft)		
23	Mosque of Muhammad Ali	Egypt	Cairo	84.1 m (276 ft)	1848	
24	Mosque-Madrassa of Sultan Hassan	Egypt	Cairo	84 m (276 ft)	1364	
25	Selimiye Mosque	Turkey	Edirne	83 m (272 ft)	1574	

== See also ==
- List of tallest minarets
