= Punto Fijo Mosque =

Mosque in Punto Fijo, Venezuela

- Mezquita de Punto Fijo
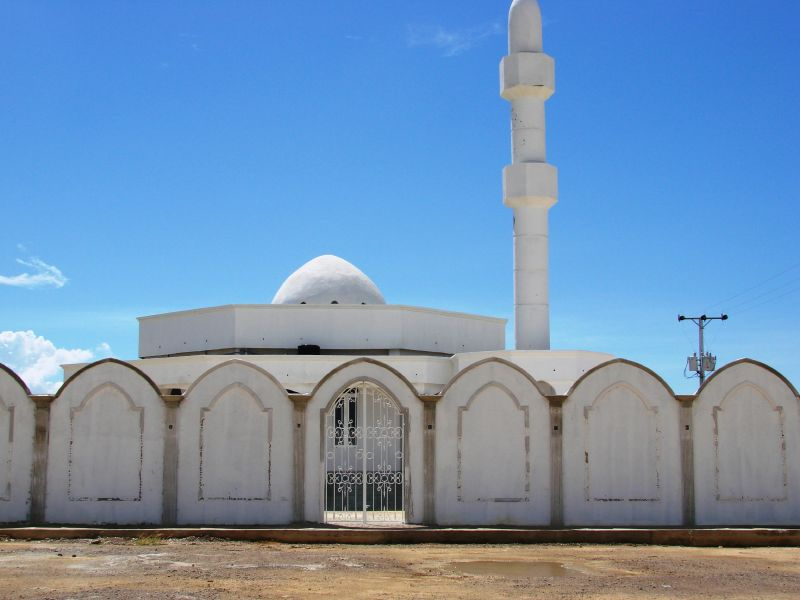

- Location of the mosque in Venezuela

Religion
- Affiliation: Islam
- Ecclesiastical or organizational status: Mosque
- Status: Active

Location
- Location: Punto Fijo, Paraguaná Peninsula, Falcón State
- Country: Venezuela
- Interactive map of Punto Fijo Mosque
- Coordinates: 11°40′09″N 70°11′54″W

Architecture
- Completed: 2008

Specifications
- Dome: 1 (maybe more)
- Minaret: 1

The Punto Fijo Mosque (Spanish: Mezquita de Punto Fijo) is a mosque located in the city of Punto Fijo on the Paraguaná Peninsula, in the autonomous municipality of Carirubana in the northern part of Falcón State, Venezuela.

It was established in 2008 owing to the growth of the Muslim community near the duty-free area of Paraguaná.

In 2012, during the events surrounding the Amuay Refinery incident, the Muslim community showed solidarity by collecting and donating supplies of food and clothing.

== See also ==
- Islam in Venezuela
- List of mosques in South America
