= Mosque of Sheikh Ibrahim Al-Ibrahim =

Mosque in Caracas, Venezuela

- Mezquita Sheikh Ibrahim Bin Abdulaziz Al Ibrahim
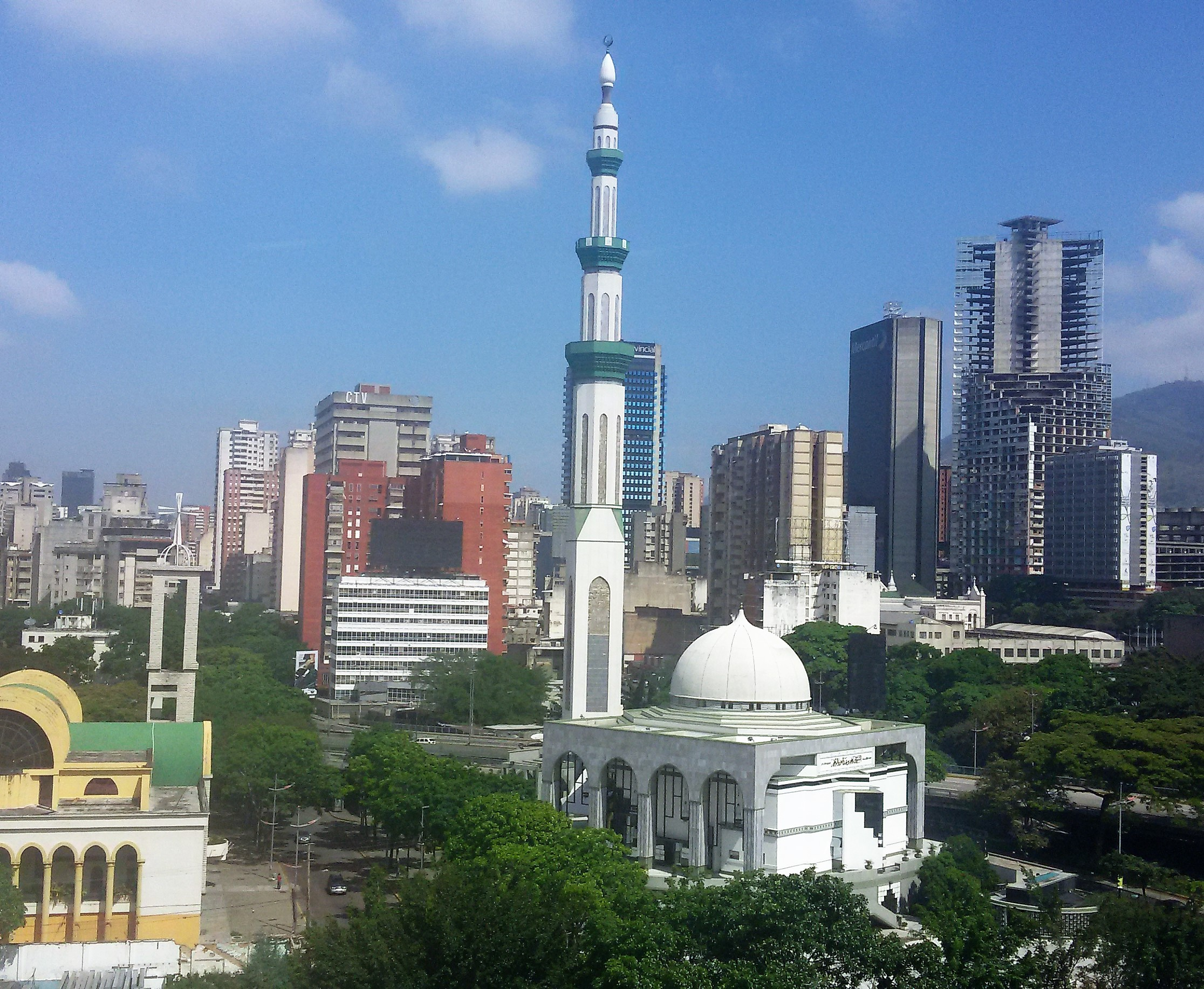

- Location of the mosque in Venezuela

Religion
- Affiliation: Islam
- Ecclesiastical or organizational status: Mosque
- Status: Active

Location
- Location: El Recreo, Caracas
- Country: Venezuela
- Interactive map of Mosque of Sheikh Ibrahim Al-Ibrahim
- Coordinates: 10°30′6″N 66°53′43″W

Architecture
- Architect: Zuhair Fayez
- Type: Mosque
- Completed: 1993

Specifications
- Capacity: 3,500 worshippers
- Interior area: 5,000 m^{2} (54,000 sq ft)
- Dome: 1
- Dome height (outer): 23 m (75 ft)
- Minaret: 1
- Minaret height: 113 m (371 ft)

The Mosque of Sheikh Ibrahim Al-Ibrahim, officially the Mosque Ibrahim Ibin Abdul Aziz Al-Ibrahim (Spanish: Mezquita Sheikh Ibrahim Bin Abdulaziz Al Ibrahim), also known as the Caracas Mosque, is a mosque in the El Recreo district of Caracas, Venezuela. It is the second largest mosque in Latin America after the King Fahd Islamic Cultural Center in Buenos Aires.

== Overview ==
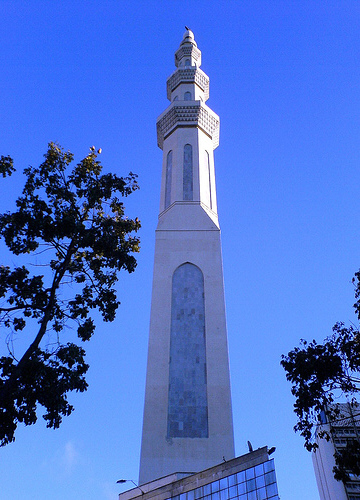
The 113 m-tall (371 ft) minaret

Mirroring modern Venezuela's religious tolerance and its oil realpolitik, the construction of the mosque began in 1989 by Sheikh Abdulaziz Bin Ibrahim Al Ibrahim.

The mosque was designed by architect, Zuhair Fayez, and occupies an area of 5,000 square metres (54,000 sq ft), its minaret is 113 metres (371 ft) high, and the dome is 23 metres (75 ft) high. Construction of the mosque was completed in 1993. The mosque can hold approximately 3,500 worshipers. Rising higher between the Catholic Cathedral a few blocks away and the Caracas Synagogue, the minaret is the highest in the Americas.

"It is like a dream come true for us," Hassan Majzoub, president of Venezuela's Islamic Center, said of the four-year project, culminated in March 1993 with the inauguration of the Caracas Islamic Center. Mr. Majzoub, a shopkeeper who emigrated from Lebanon in 1968, acknowledged that the 100,000 Muslims in Venezuela were easily surpassed in number by Muslims in Argentina, Brazil and the United States.

== See also ==
- Islam in Venezuela
- List of mosques in the Americas
