= Zuhair Fayez Partnership =

Architectural, Project Management, Construction Management, company

Zuhair Fayez Partnership شركة زهير فايز ومشاركوه
- Company type: Private company
- Industry: Architecture/Engineering
- Founded: 1975
- Founder: Zuhair Hamed Fayez
- Area served: International
- Key people: Zuhair Hamed Fayez (CEO); Mufadhal Abbas Shkara (SVP)
- Number of employees: 3470 (as of October 2014)
- Website: www.zfp.com

Zuhair Fayez Partnership (ZFP) (Arabic: شركة زهير فايز ومشاركوه), formerly Zuhair Fayez and Associates (ZFA), is an Architectural, Engineering, Project Management, Construction Management, and Engineering Information System consultancy firm in the Kingdom of Saudi Arabia.

== History ==
Zuhair Fayez Partnership was established in 1975 as Zuhair Fayez and Associates by Zuhair H. Fayez and started with a small number of professional architects, engineers, planners, and support staff. The growing number of commissions and projects eventually prompted the organization to open an office in London to meet the demand.

Eight departments were initially formed: Design, Architectural Production, Structural Engineering, Civil Engineering, HVAC, Specifications, and Quantity Surveying departments. However, the demand for professional management and supervision of large scale projects led to the creation of the Project Management and Construction Management departments to effectively monitor and control all contractors and subcontractors' work on any construction project.

In 1991, the organization launched its Information Technology division to provide clients with software and hardware. The division handled the software integration of Maintenance Management Systems (MMS), Geographical Information Systems (GIS), and Facilities Management Systems (FMS) into a single graphical user interface (GUI). In the same year, the Engineering Information Systems division was formed and is responsible for on-site implementation and provision of GIS, MMS, and FMS based on the clients' needs and requirements.

ZFP partnered with Avaya in May 2011 to create a virtual computing environment (VCE). The purpose is to enable the organization to provide virtual services in a cloud-based environment that would serve 3000 users in 5 branches and 20 remote sites and maximize the efficiency of its existing IT resources.

In July 2012, SNC-Lavalin acquired ZFP's industrial division in Khobar to form SNC-Lavalin Fayez Engineering, a joint-venture with ZFP, in response to Saudi Aramco's General Engineering Services Plus (GES+) initiative.

In 2014, Zuhair Fayez Partnership was assigned to build a new campus for the American International School of Jeddah to accommodate 1,700 students. The announcement was made at ZFP's main headquarters during the groundbreaking ceremony.

== Global offices ==
Saudi Arabia: Jeddah, Riyadh, Madinah, Makkah, Dammam

Middle East: Cairo

Asia Pacific: Philippines (closed)

== Significant projects ==
- 1995: King Fahd Islamic Cultural Center, Buenos Aires, Argentina
- 1998: Royal Saudi Air Force Museum, Riyadh, Saudi Arabia
- 2003: King Khalid University, Abha, Saudi Arabia
- 2008: King Abdulaziz International Airport, Jeddah, Saudi Arabia
- 2008: Queen Alia International Airport, Jordan
- 2010: Information Technology and Communications Complex, Riyadh, Saudi Arabia
- 2011: Prince Nayef bin Abdulaziz Regional Airport, Qassim, Saudi Arabia
