= Islam in Venezuela =

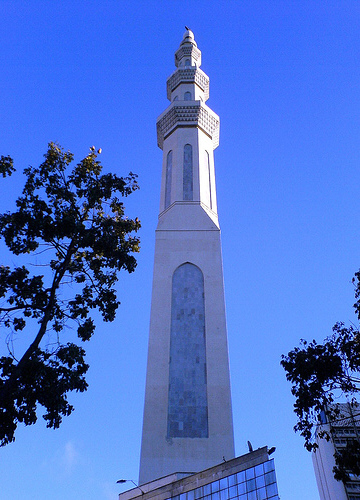
The Mosque of Sheikh Ibrahim Al-Ibrahim in Caracas is the second biggest mosque in Latin America.

Islam is a minority religion in Venezuela. There are approximately 100,000 Muslims in Venezuela which make up 0.4 percent of the nation's population. Venezuela has a small but influential Muslim population. Many of them are Arabs of Lebanese, Palestinian, Syrian and Turkish descent.

The capital city Caracas has a Muslim population of 15,000. The Mosque of Sheikh Ibrahim Al-Ibrahim in Caracas is the second largest mosque in Latin America. Located in a rapidly changing area of the city, this historic mosque features a dome, minaret and portal to signal its presence in the urban landscape, and devices such as the octagonal hall rising up from a platform to a circular dome to achieve the transition between the street and the interior of the prayer hall. It was constructed with funds from the Ibrahim bin Abdul Aziz Al-Ibrahim Foundation under the planning of architect Oscar Bracho. Other notable mosques and Islamic organisations include the Isla Margarita-Caribe La Comunidad Islámica Venezolana, Centro Islámico de Venezuela, the Mezquita al-Rauda in Maracaibo, the Asociación Honorable Mezquita de Jerusalén in Valencia, Centro Islámico de Maiquetía in Vargas, and the Asociación Benéfica Islámica in Bolívar. There is also a mosque in Punto Fijo built in 2008.

Margarita Island in particular is home to a sizeable Arab Muslim community. The local cable television outlets telecast channels like al-Jazeera; LBC Sat, a Lebanese channel; and more recently, MBC and ART, two Saudi Arabian channels. Women wearing hijab generally work as till operators. On most shop counters, Quranic verses are on display. Muslims here are mainly involved in retail businesses as well as banks and travel agencies.

== Muslim Migration ==
Philipp Bruckmayr, from University of Vienna, traces the origins of the Islamic presence in Venezuela to the migration of Syrian and Lebanese communities beginning in the late nineteenth century. However, Venezuela became a more significant destination between 1947 and the early 1970s, partly due to its expanding oil-based economy and commercial opportunities. Although this migration wave remained predominantly Christian, it also included Sunni Muslims, Druze and Alawites. The institutionalization of Islam in Venezuela advanced with the establishment of Islamic centres in Caracas between 1968 and 1972 according to the researcher.

== Activism ==
On 11 February 2006, around 200 (mainly Muslim) protesters marched to the Danish embassy in Caracas, and burnt Danish and U.S. flags as protests over cartoons of Muhammad spread to Latin America.

On 20 July 2006, dozens of people marched in Caracas towards the Israeli embassy to protest against the war in Lebanon. Most of them were Venezuelan Muslims, but some were members of pro-government organisations.

== Religious institutions ==
Institutions	Type	Location	Branch
Ibrahim Al Ibrahim Mosque	Mosque	Caracas, Capital District	Hanbali
Islamic Center of Venezuela	Islamic center	Caracas, Capital District	Shafi
Imam Al Hadi Islamic Center	Islamic center	Caracas, Capital District	Shia
Venezuelan Islamic Community		Caracas, Capital District	
Al-Rauda Mosque	Mosque	Maracaibo, Zulia	
Islamic Association of the Palestine Mosque	Mosque	El Limón-Maracay, Aragua	
Honorable Association of the Jerusalem Mosque	Mosque	Valencia, Carabobo	
Islamic Center of Maiquetía	Islamic center	Maiquetía, La Guaira	
Islamic Charity Association		Bolívar	
Islamic Center of the South	Islamic center	El Tigre, Anzoátegui	
Islamic Palestinian Center	Islamic center	Coro, Falcón	
Punto Fijo Mosque	Mosque	Punto Fijo, Falcón	
Islamic Community of Venezuela		Margarita, Nueva Esparta	
Honorable Association of the Omar ben al-Khattab Mosque	Mosque	San Felipe, Yaracuy	

== See also ==
- Latin American Muslims
- Latino Muslims
