= Abdülhamid Han Mosque =

Mosque in Kahramanmaraş, Turkey

- Abdülhamid Han Camii
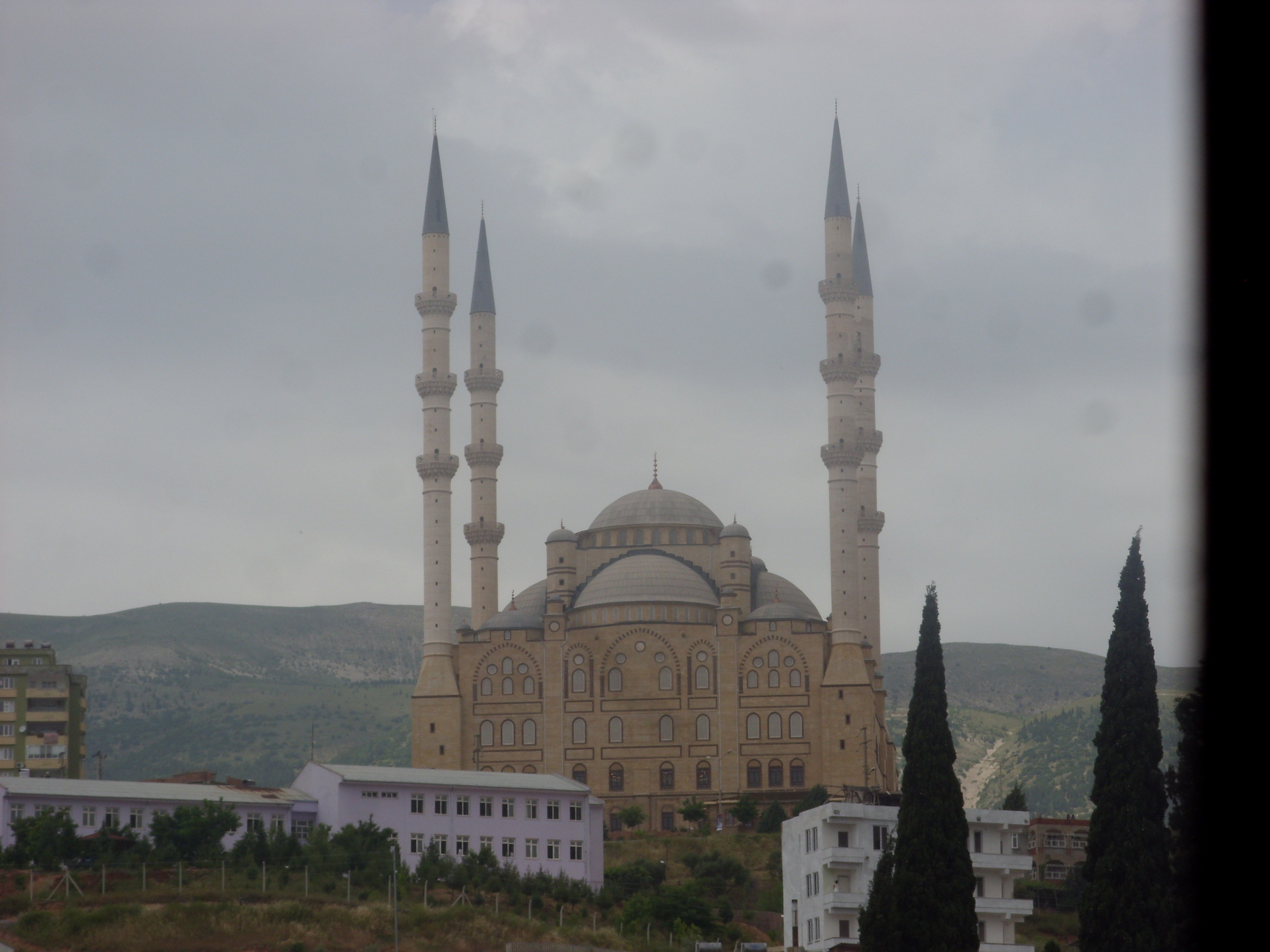

Religion
- Affiliation: Islam
- Status: Active

Location
- Location: Kahramanmaraş, Turkey
- Interactive map of Abdülhamid Han Mosque
- Coordinates: 37°34′52″N 36°54′35″E

Architecture
- Architect: Hacı Mehmet Güner
- Type: Mosque
- Established: 1993
- Completed: 2011

Specifications
- Dome: 32
- Dome height (inner): 46 m (151 ft)
- Dome dia. (inner): 19.25 m (63.2 ft)
- Minaret: 4
- Minaret height: 88 m (289 ft)
- Materials: Marble, tile, lumber, stained glass, travertine

Abdülhamid Han Mosque (Turkish: Abdülhamid Han Camii) was built in honor of the 34th Ottoman Sultan, Abdul Hamid II. A sermon is delivered in his name at this mosque every Friday. It is the fourth largest mosque in Turkey and the largest in Kahramanmaraş. Its capacity is 10,000. The building is located in Onikişubat District, Abdulhamit Han Neighborhood, Mercimek Tepe Street.

The Abdülhamid Han Mosque ranks fourth in size after Çamlıca Mosque, Kocatepe Mosque, and Sabancı Merkez Mosque. Influenced by classical Ottoman architecture, the mosque is integrated into the city's skyline and is visible from everywhere. This characteristic gives it a historic appearance despite its newness. Built in the style of a külliye, the mosque is a monumental structure for the city. Its plan, decoration, technique, and materials are traditional.

It resembles the Selimiye Mosque, with its three-balconied minarets at each corner. The square-plan mosque's central dome is supported by four semi-domes. Similar to the Şehzade Mosque and the Sultan Ahmet Mosque, the dome is supported by four elephant piers.
