= King Fahd Islamic Cultural Center =

Mosque in Buenos Aires, Argentina

King Fahd Islamic Cultural Center Islamic Cultural Center "Custodian of the Two Holy Mosques King Fahd in Argentina"
- Spanish: Centro Cultural Islámico "Custodio de las Dos Sagradas Mezquitas, Rey Fahd"
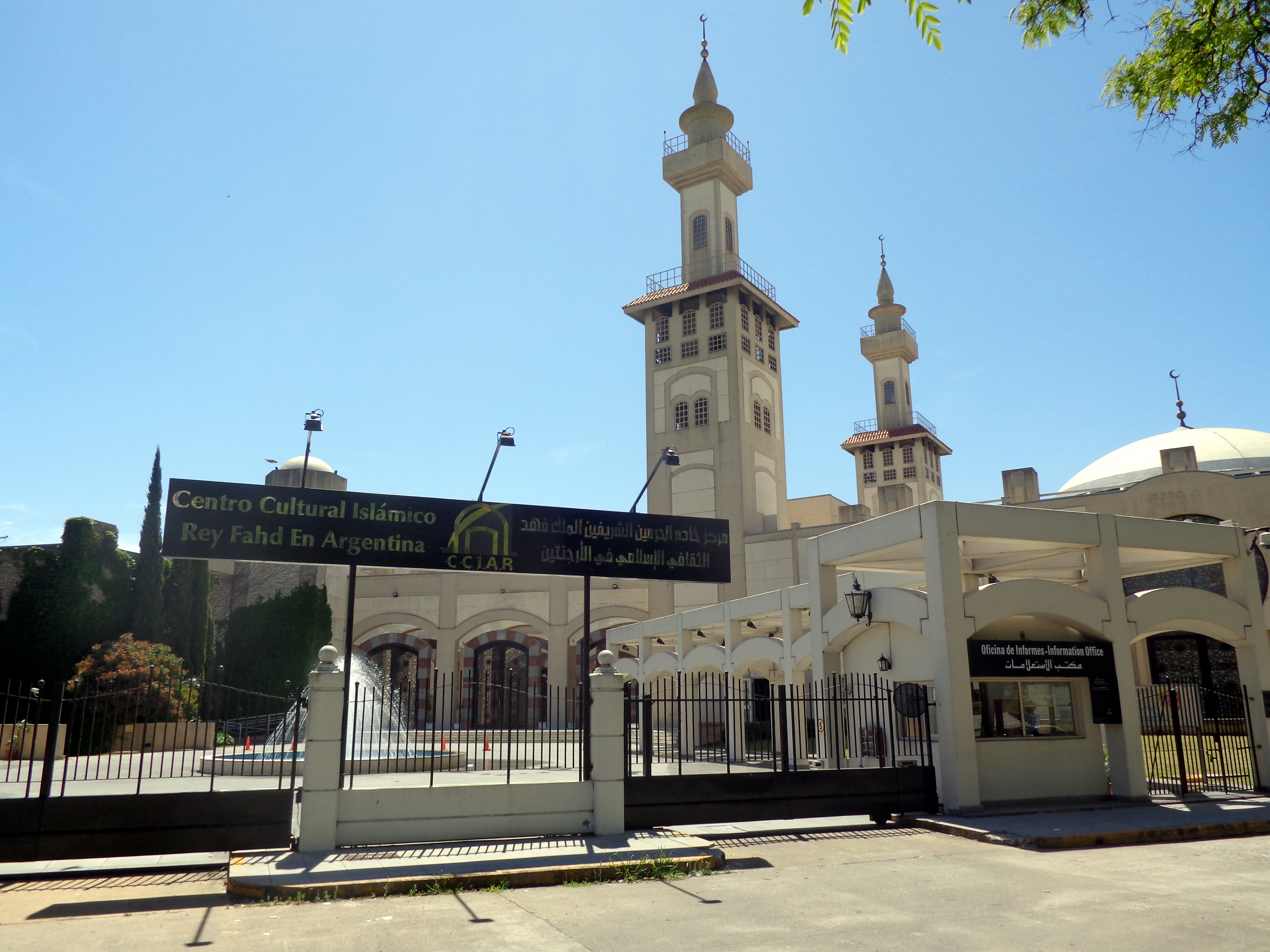
- Main facade and entrance

- Location of the mosque in Buenos Aires

Religion
- Affiliation: Sunni Islam
- Ecclesiastical or organisational status: Mosque
- Status: Active

Location
- Location: Av. Int. Bullrich 55, Palermo, Buenos Aires
- Country: Argentina
- Coordinates: 34°34′24″S 58°25′31″W

Architecture
- Architect: Zuhair Fayez
- Type: Mosque architecture
- Style: Arabic
- Funded by: Government of Saudi Arabia
- Completed: 2000

Specifications
- Capacity: 1,600 worshippers
- Minaret: 2

Website
- ccislamicoreyfahd.org.ar

The King Fahd Islamic Cultural Center, officially the Islamic Cultural Center "Custodian of the Two Holy Mosques King Fahd in Argentina" (Spanish: Centro Cultural Islámico "Custodio de las Dos Sagradas Mezquitas, Rey Fahd"; abbreviated as CCIAR), is a Sunni Islam mosque and center for Islamic culture located in Buenos Aires, Argentina. It is named after King Fahd of Saudi Arabia.

== Overview ==
The King Fahd Islamic Cultural Center became the largest mosque in Latin America, after President Carlos Menem's 1995 grant of 34,000 square metres (370,000 sq ft) of municipal land in the Palermo section of Buenos Aires, following a state visit to Saudi Arabia.

Inaugurated in 2000, the mosque and cultural center was constructed as a gift from the Saudi government on land donated by the Argentine government. Designed by Saudi architect Zuhair Fayez in the Arabic style, the building includes prayer halls with capacities for 1,200 men and 400 women. The cultural center hosts a primary and secondary school, a divinity school and a dormitory for 50 students.

Due to its location, it is also known as La mezquita de Palermo.

Apart from religious activities, the Center also organises sporting and social events such as football and cricket matches (for men exclusively) and Arabic language classes; all are free and open to the public.

== Gallery ==
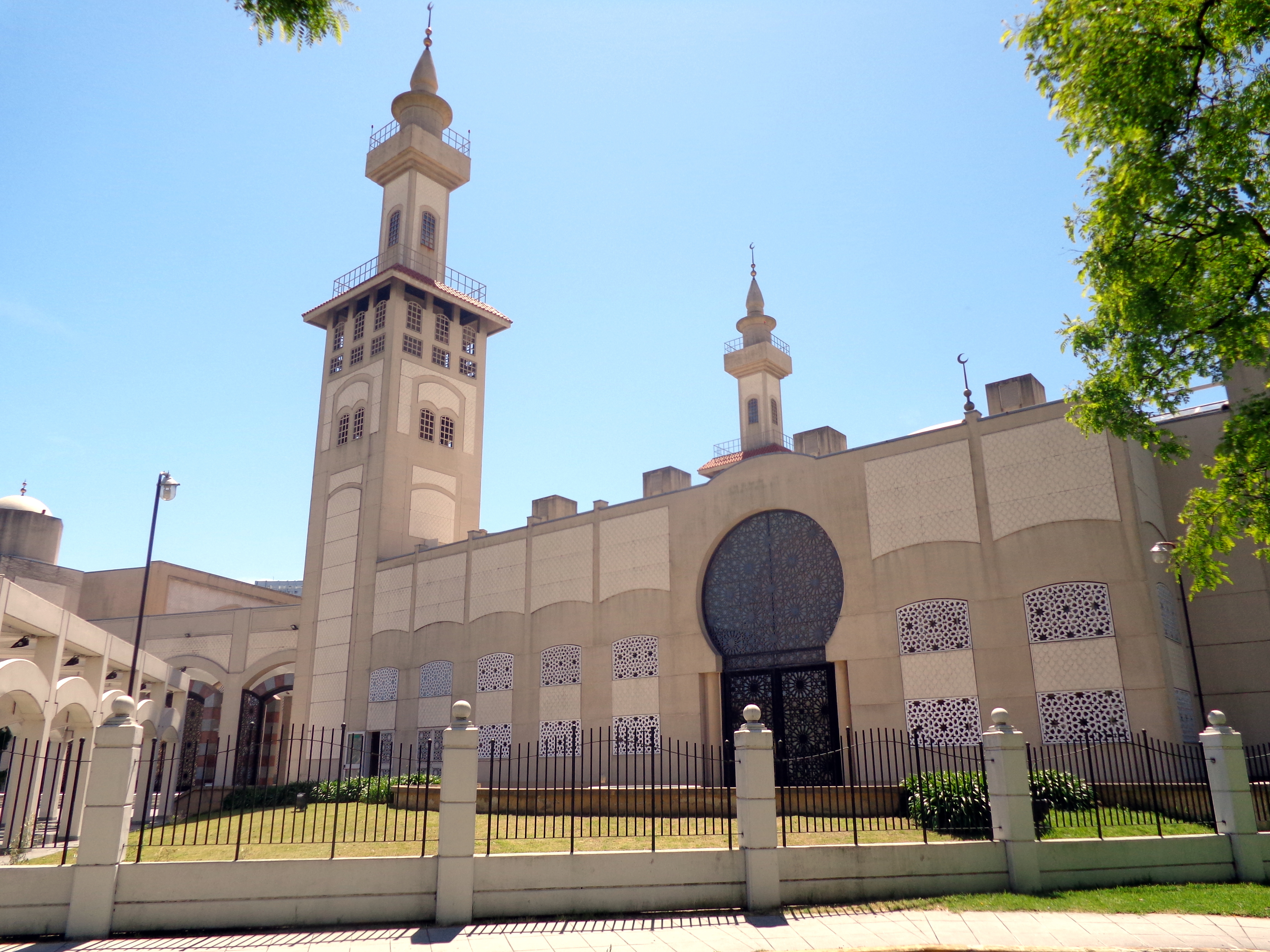
Center main front facade

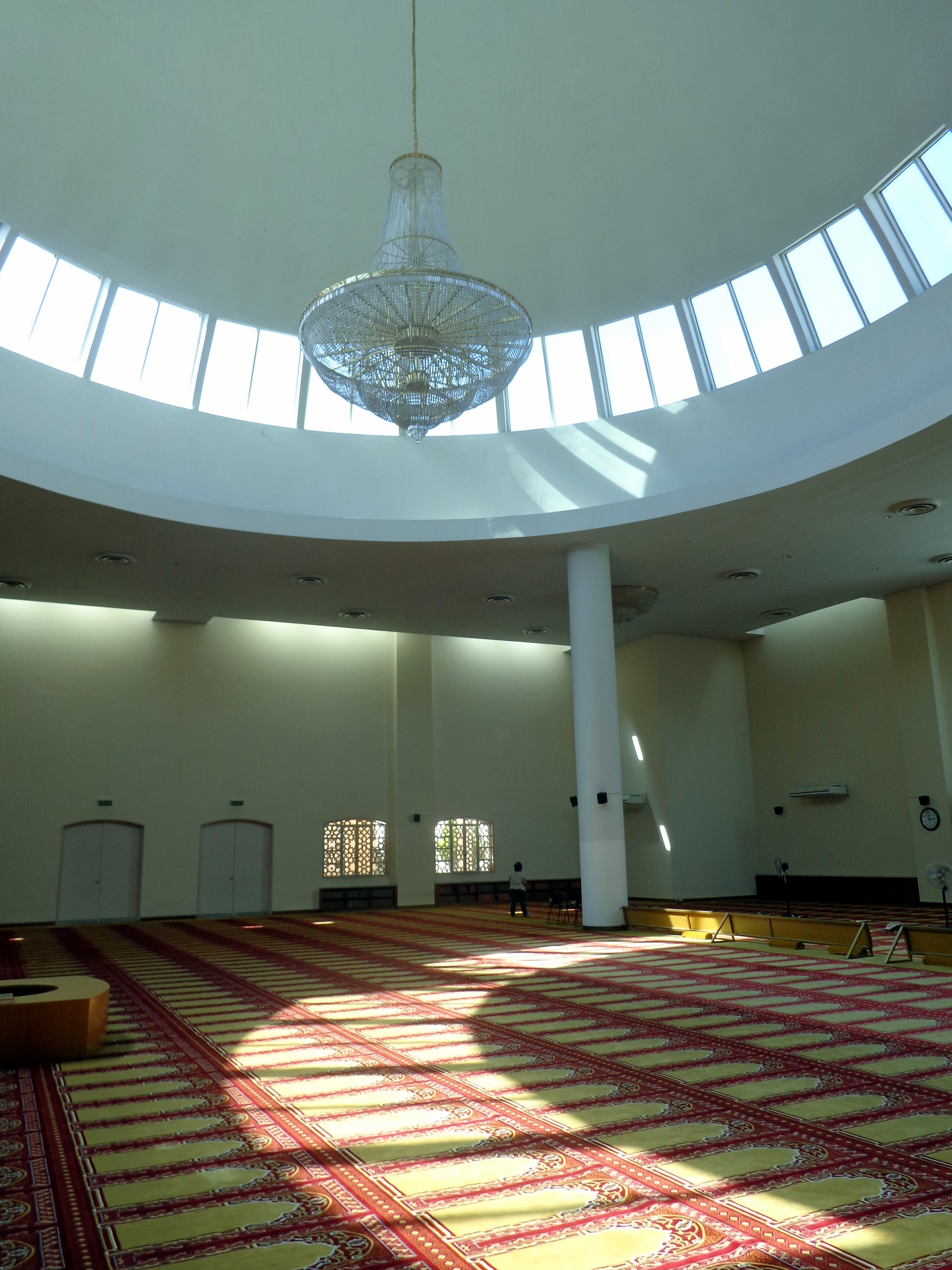
Main prayer hall inside mosque

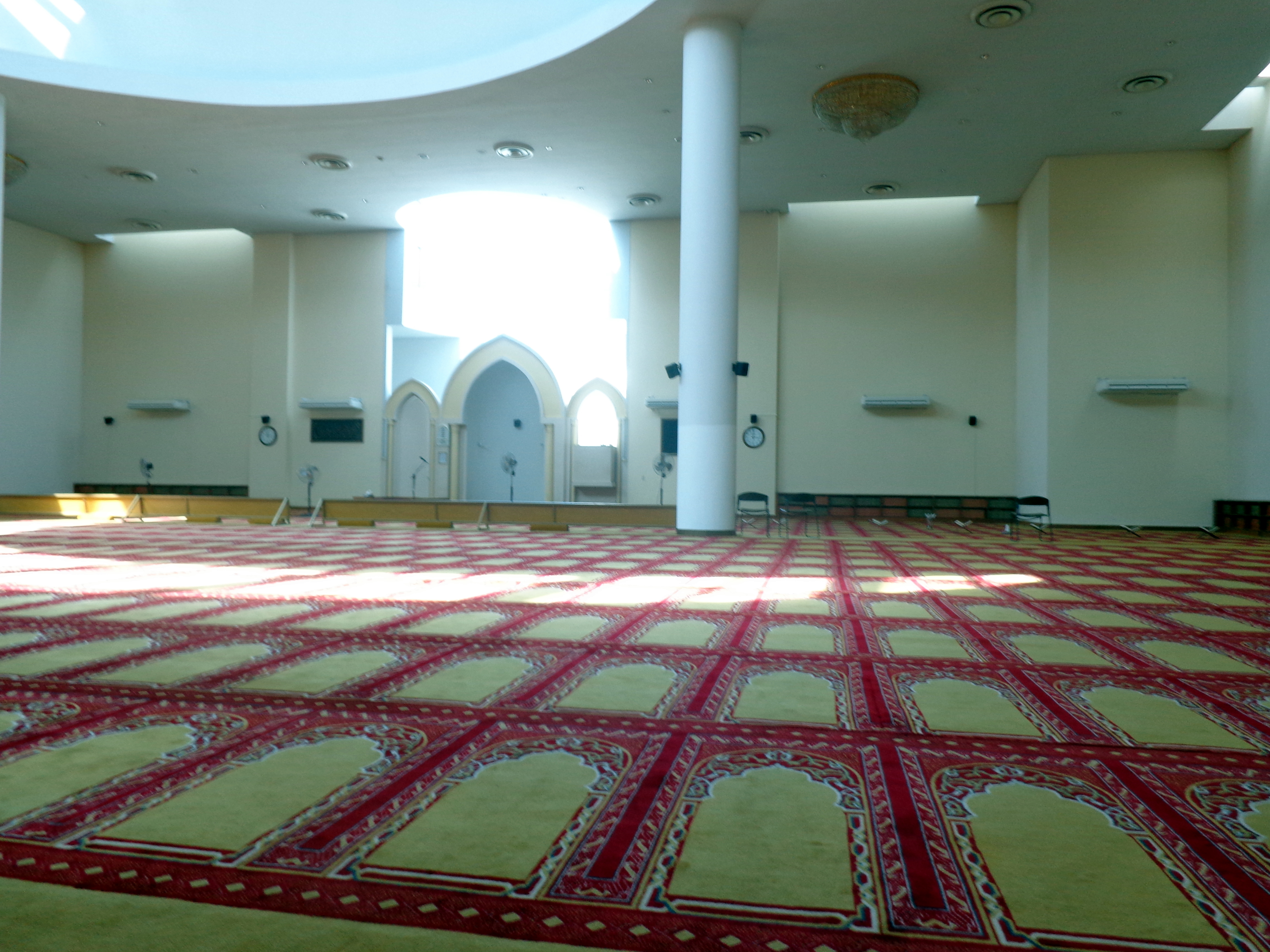
Main prayer hall inside mosque

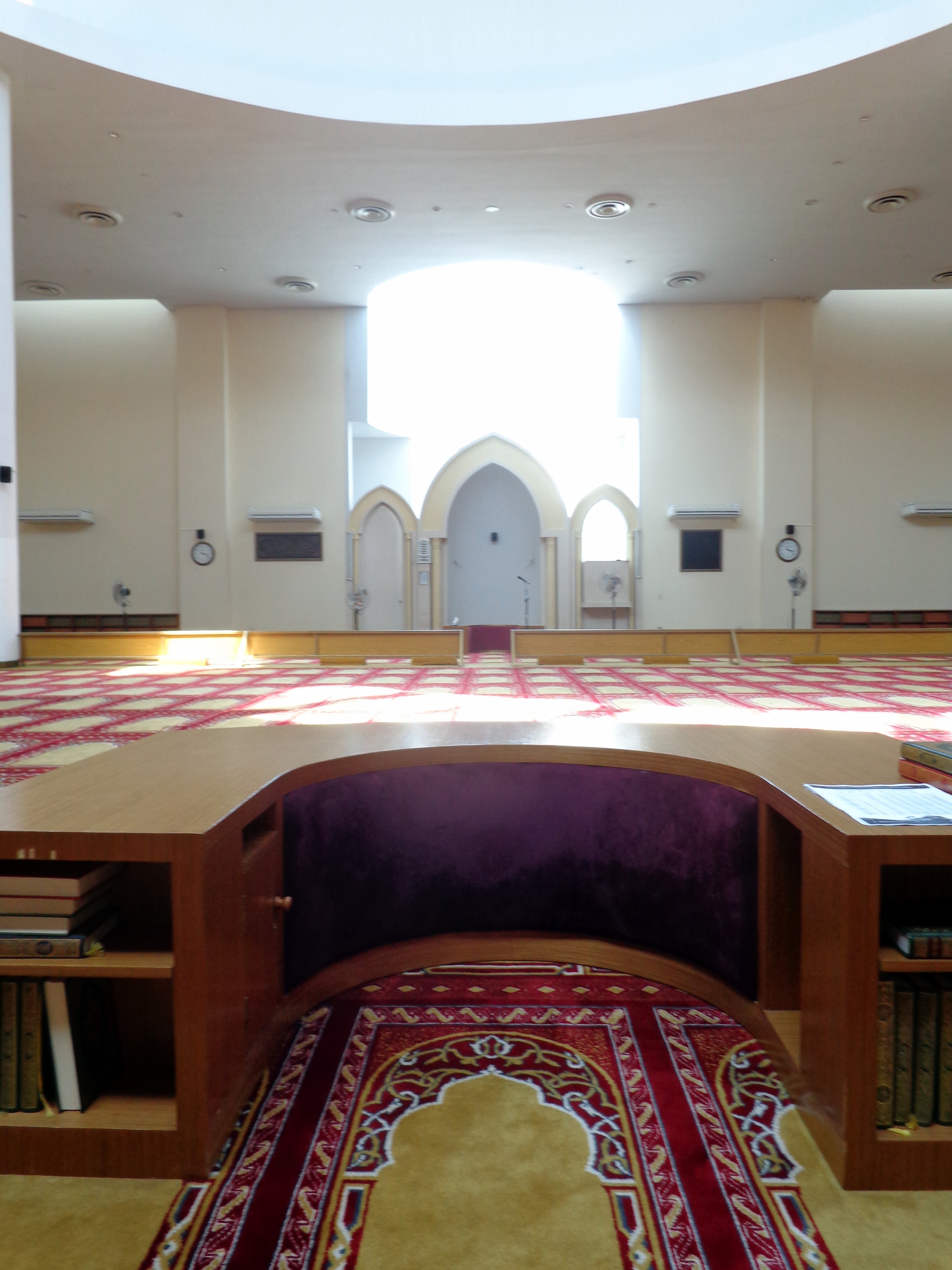
Place where the Imam stands when prayers

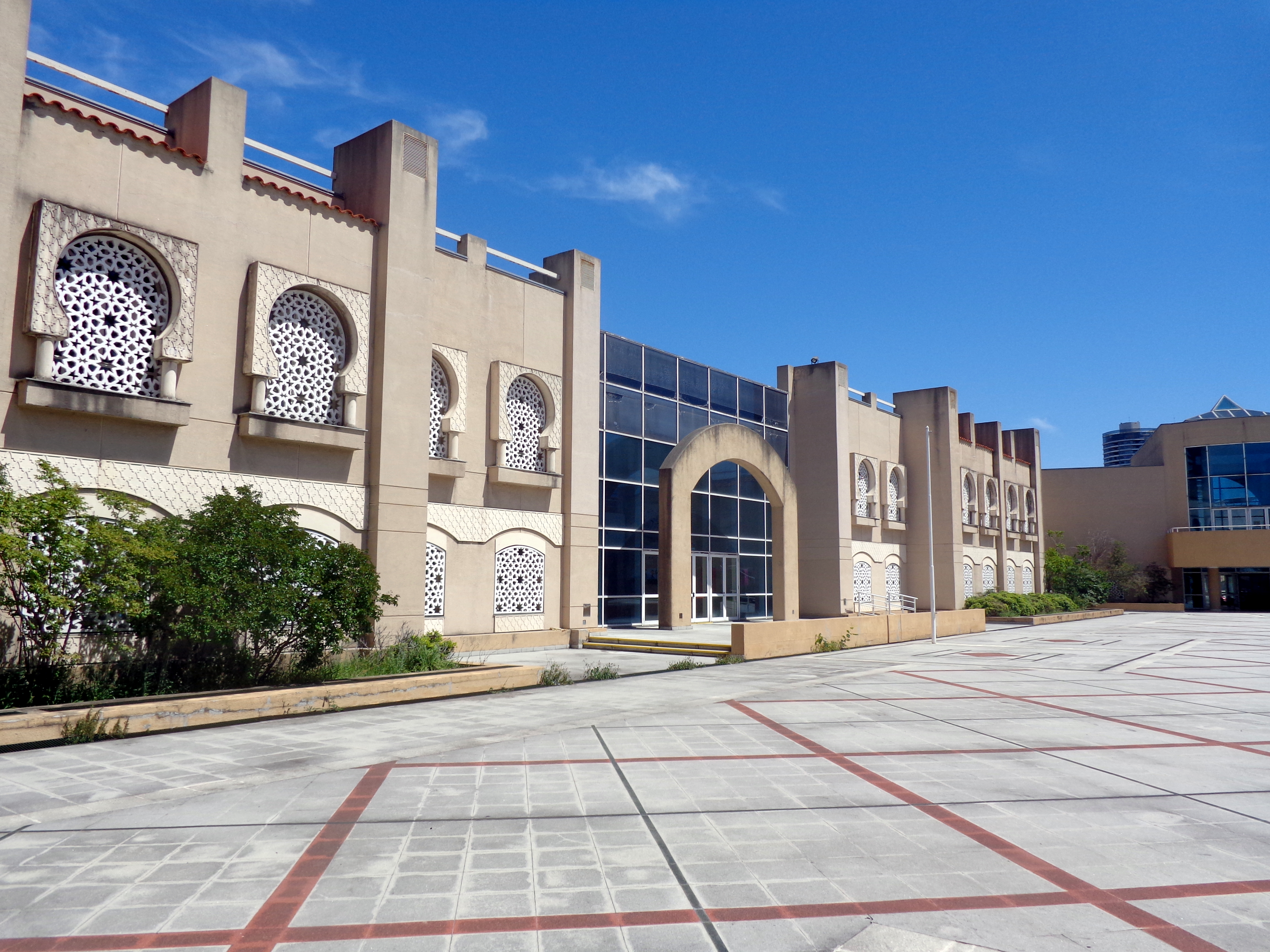
View from road

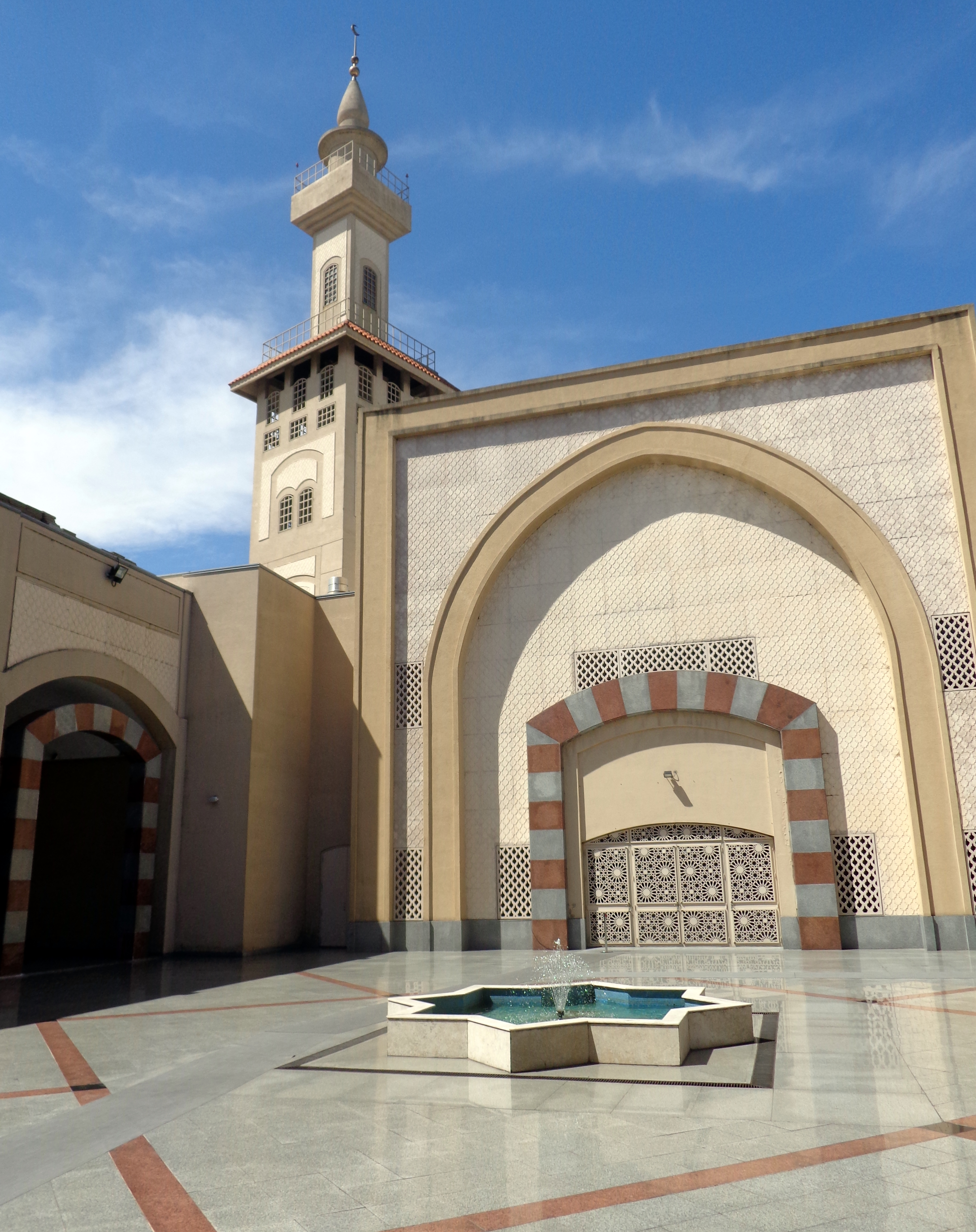
A courtyard inside the complex

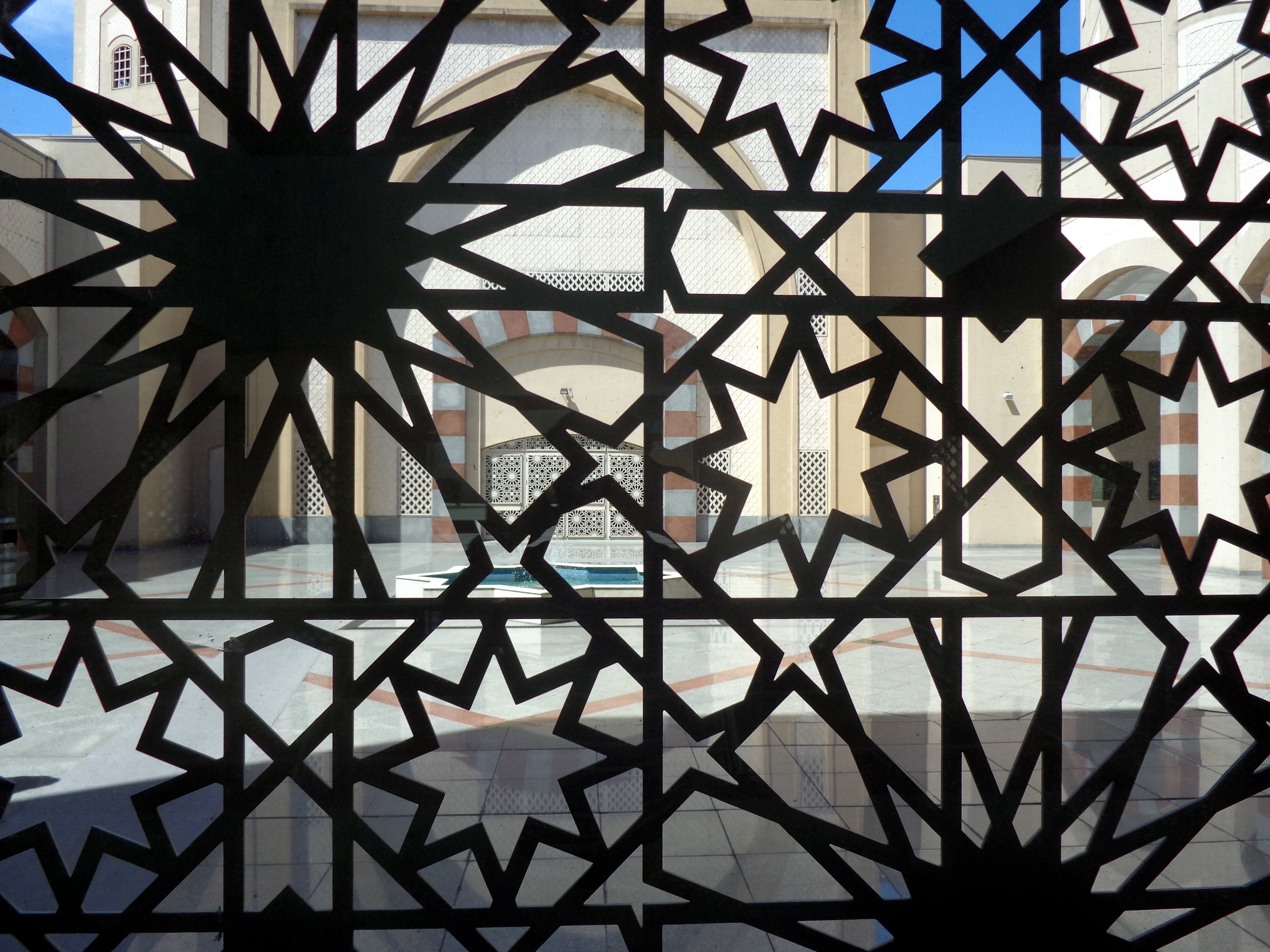

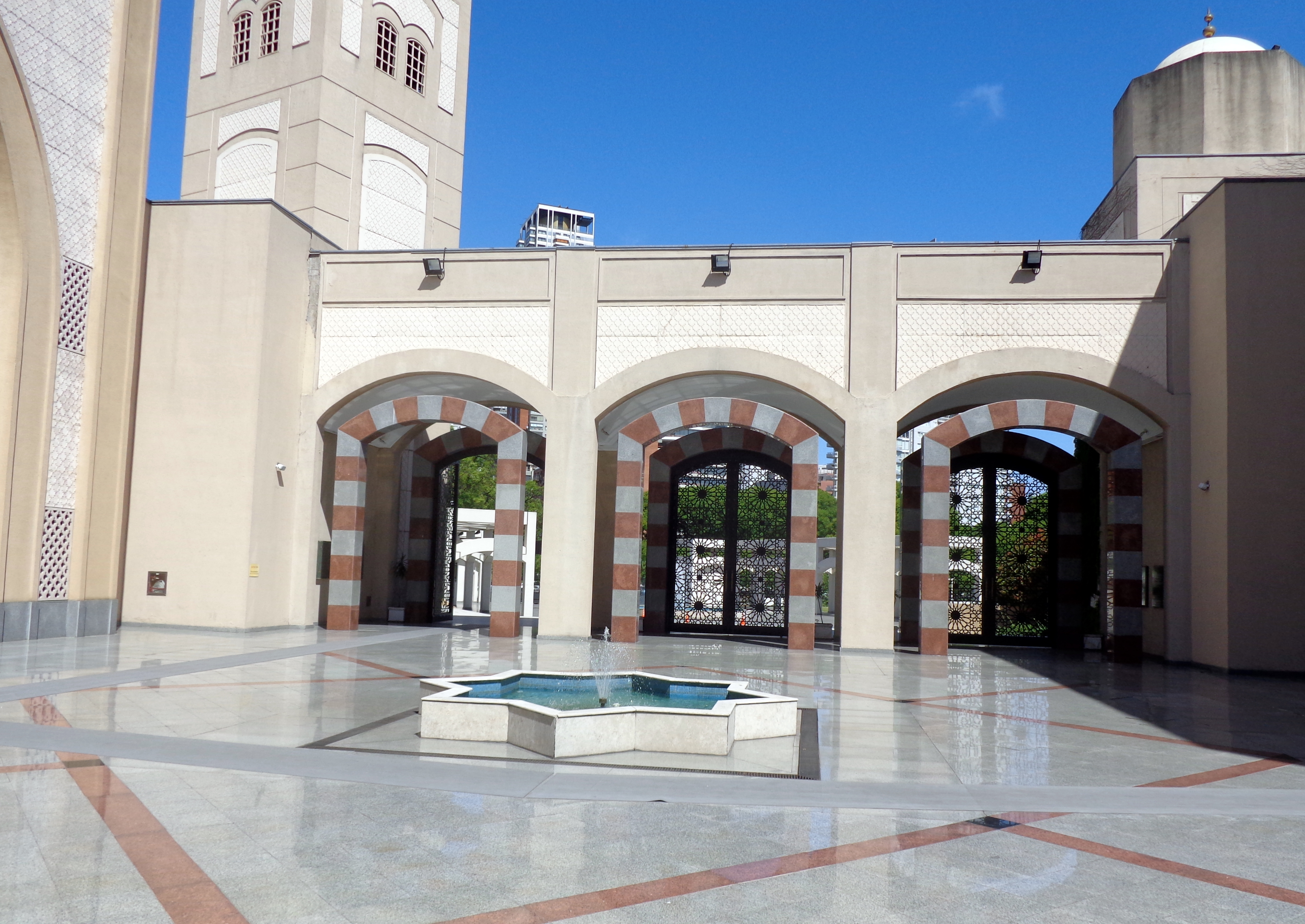

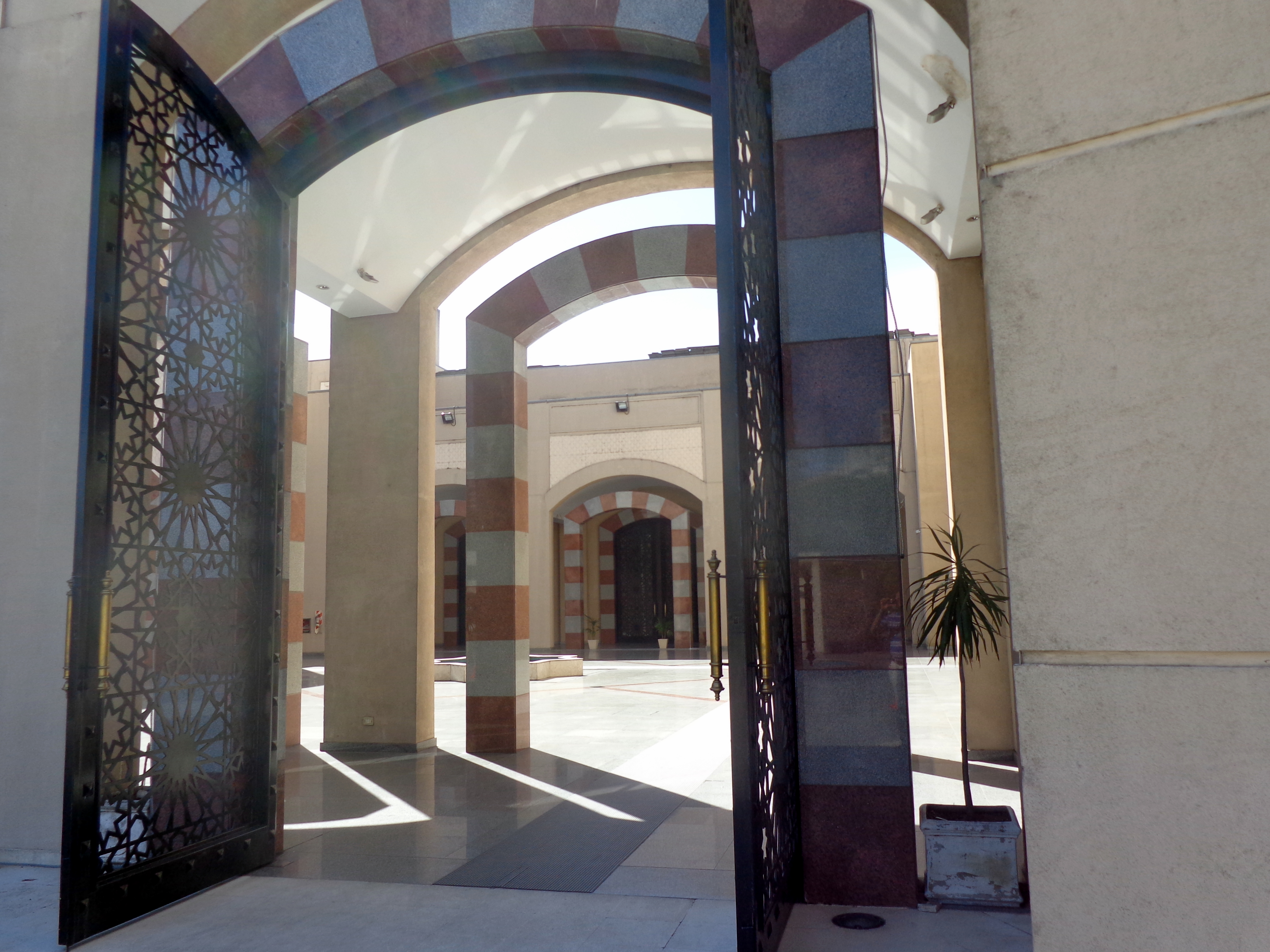

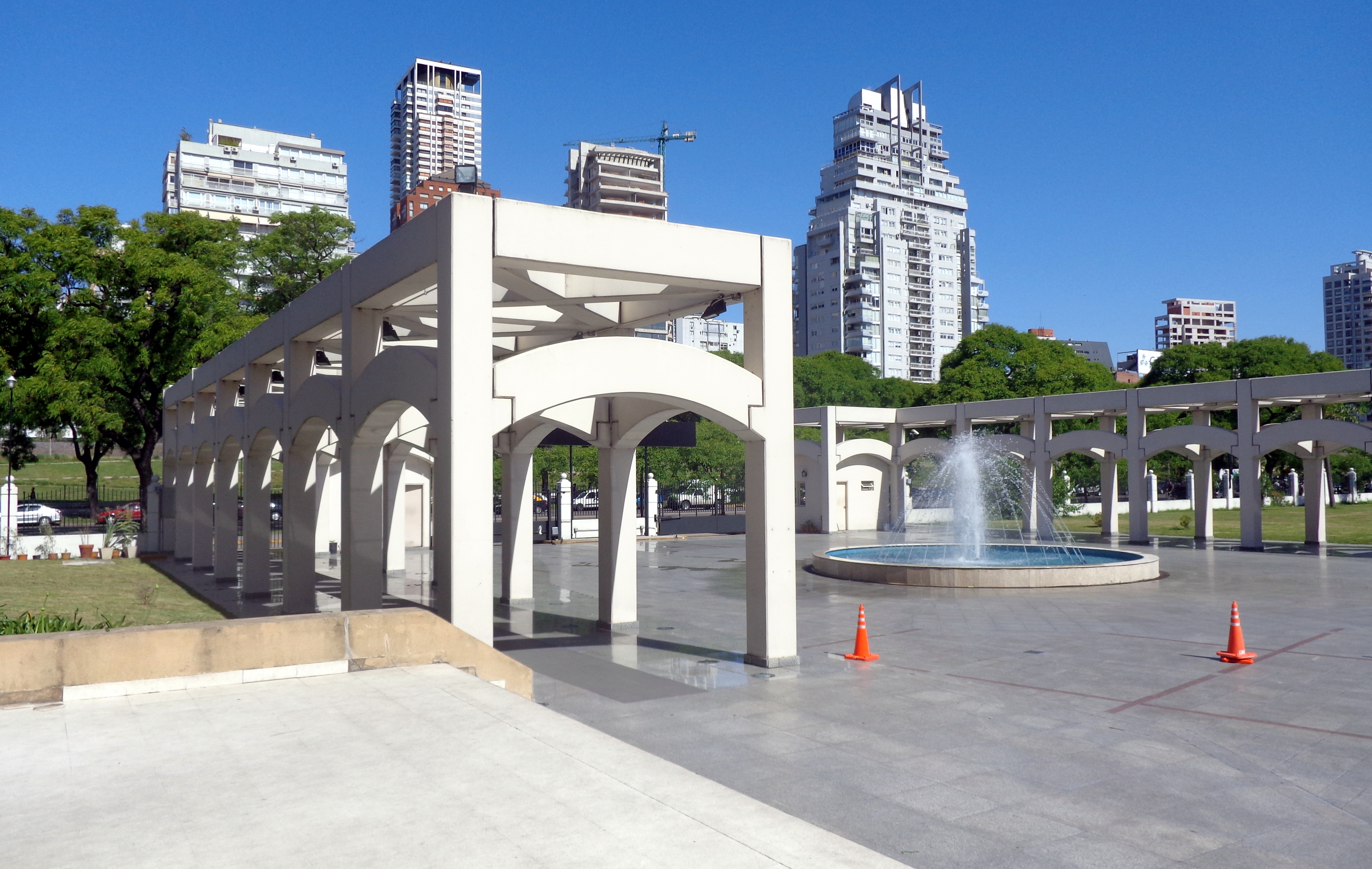

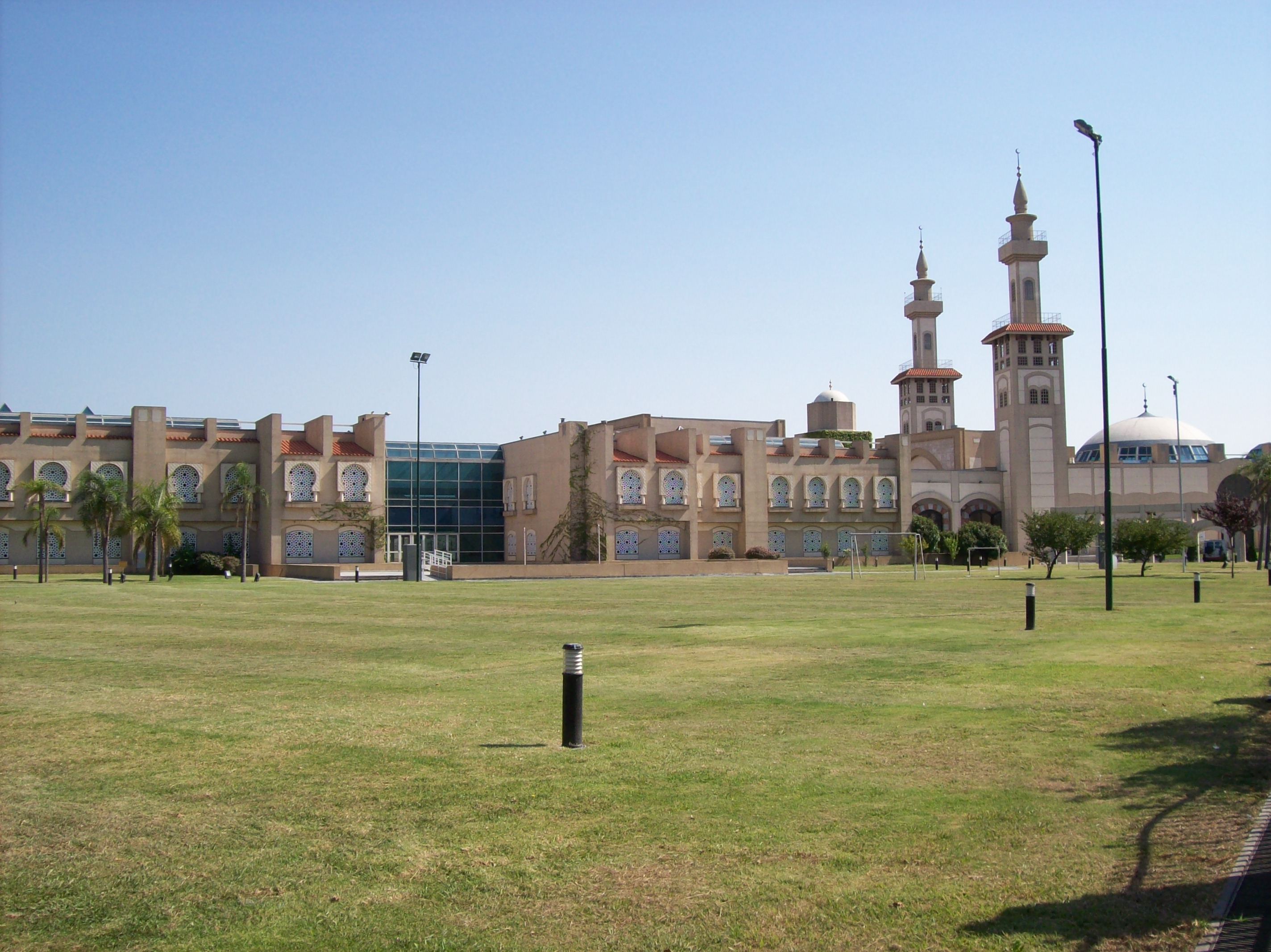

== See also ==
- Islam in Argentina
- List of mosques in Argentina
- List of things named after Saudi kings
