= Sabancı Central mosque =

Mosque in Adana, Turkey

Sabancı Central Mosque
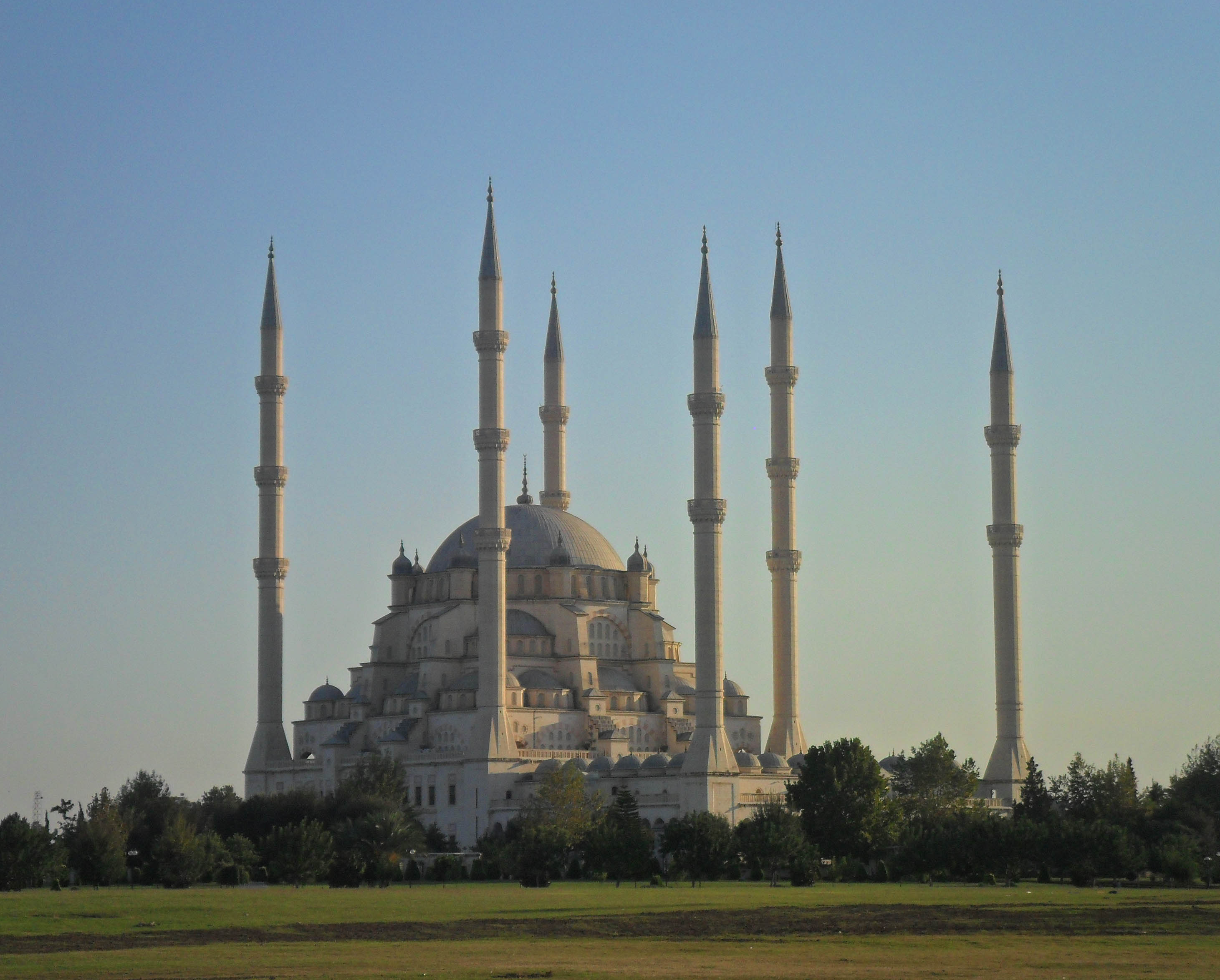

Religion
- Affiliation: Islam
- Branch/tradition: Sunni Islam

Location
- Location: Seyhan, Adana, Turkey
- Interactive map of Sabancı Central Mosque
- Coordinates: 36°59′29″N 35°20′03″E

Architecture
- Architect: Necip Dinç
- Type: Mosque
- Style: Neo-Ottoman
- Groundbreaking: 1988
- Completed: 1998

Specifications
- Capacity: 28,500
- Dome height (outer): 54 m
- Minaret: 6
- Minaret height: 99 m

Sabancı Central Mosque (Turkish: Sabancı Merkez Camii) in Adana is the second largest mosque in Turkey. The exterior of the mosque (and its interior decoration) is similar to the Selimiye Mosque in Edirne, though it has six minarets, similar to the Sultan Ahmed Mosque (Blue Mosque) in Istanbul.

The mosque, which went into service in 1998, was constructed upon a confiscated Armenian cemetery. It is built on a total of 52,600 square metres (566,000 square feet) of land and has a closed area of 6,600 square metres (71,000 square feet).

Sabancı Central Mosque was built jointly by Turkish Religious Foundation and Sabanci Foundation. The proprietorship of the mosque belongs to Adana Religious Affairs Foundation and its usage rights have been transferred to Adana Provincial Office of Mufti.

== Architecture ==
Sabancı Central Mosque is built on the intersection of the main arteries, railway lines and roads that connect Adana to the surrounding cities and towns, has almost become the symbol of the city with its high minarets visible from almost anywhere in the city. The mosque, which can accommodate 28,500 worshippers, is famous for being one of the biggest mosques in the Middle East.

Located on the banks of Seyhan River, Sabancı Central Mosque has a majestic structure with 6 minarets. Eight pillars carry the main dome that has a diameter of 32 metres (105 feet). The height of the main dome is 54 metres (177 feet) from floor level. The four minarets, which are adjacent to the main building, are each 99 metres (325 feet) high and the other two minarets located at the semi-enclosed porch are each 75 metres (246 feet) high.

The mosque includes 4 classrooms, 10 itikaf rooms, rooms of imam and muezzin, discussion rooms and a fountain.

All of the calligraphic works in the mosque is by the calligrapher Huseyin Kutlu. The tile work has been done by using Iznik tile work technique. Four big panels facing Kiblah are the world's biggest mosque panels in size.

All painting and tile patterns in the Mosque belong to Architect Nakkas M. Semih Irtes. The niche, pulpit, platform, entrance and other doors are all made of marble and they have been designed in the style that is seen in classical Ottoman mosques and have been built by Nihat Kartal.

The wooden doors were built in "kundekari" style by Ahmet Yılçay, all stained glass works were made by Abdülkadir Aydin and "mukarnas" works were produced by Ali Turan.

The minarets have been built as armoured concrete which was produced by mixing white cement and crushed stone of ivory color.

The internal and external illumination projects and inner sound system projects belong to Philips. Additionally, with the central radio system built in the minaret with elevator and realized by Aselsan, sermons are made available to 275 mosques located within an area of 60 kilometres (37 miles) diameter by central broadcast system.

On the west side of the Mosque, there is a classical and a digital library as a separate annex, open for researchers and the public.

Honey sherbet is offered at Sebil Fountain on special religious days.

== Gallery ==
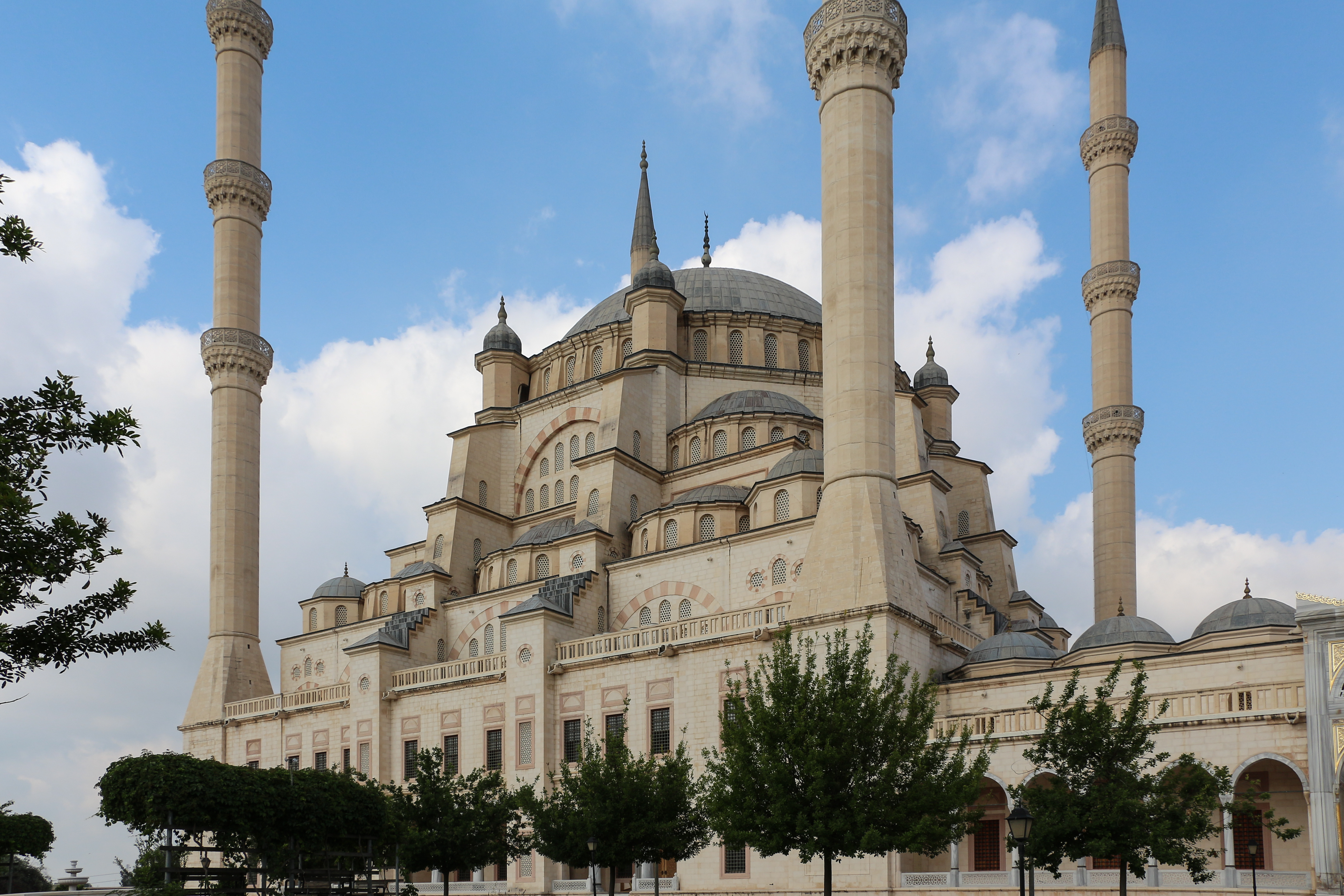
Just outside the courtyard of the mosque

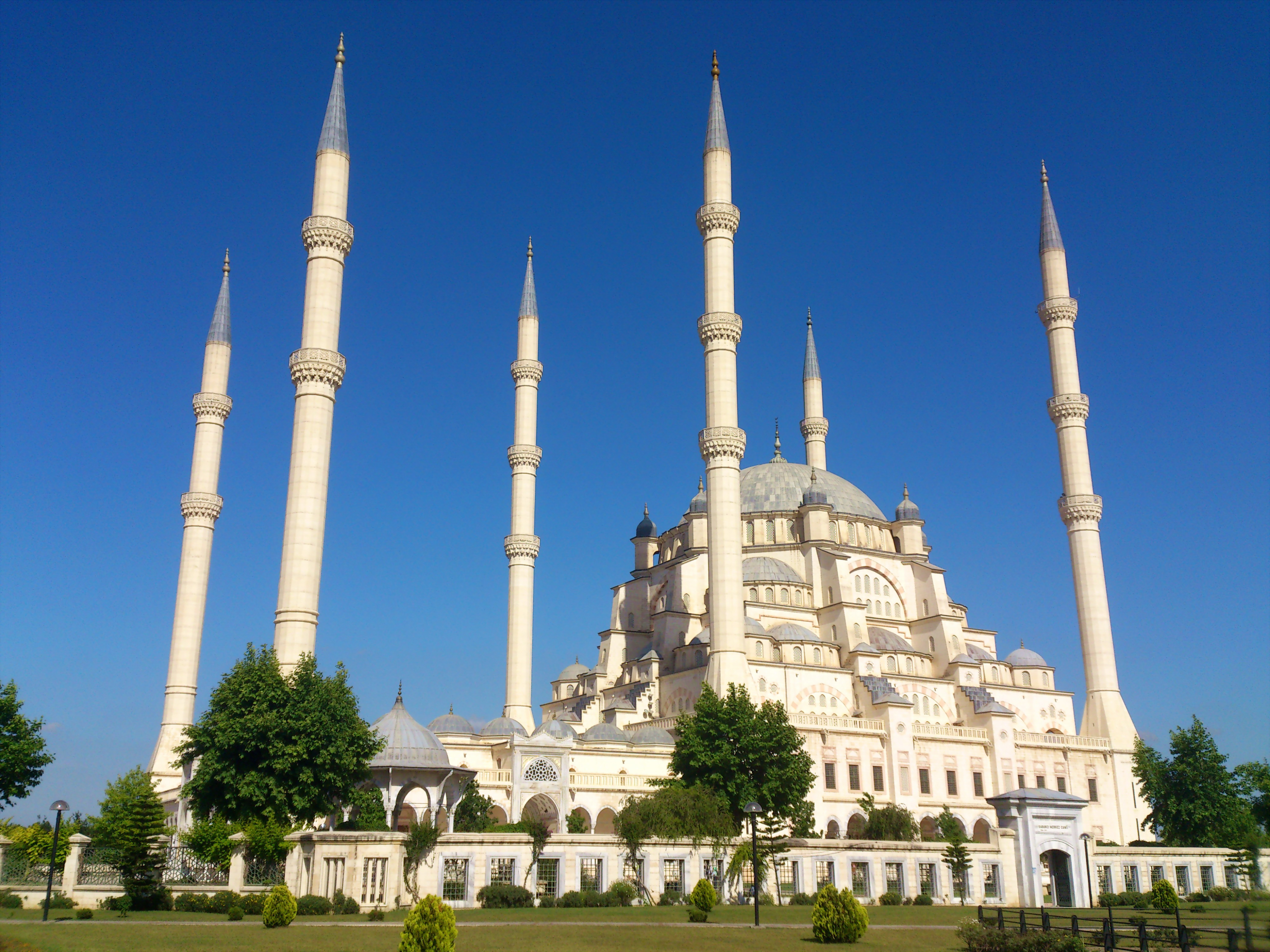

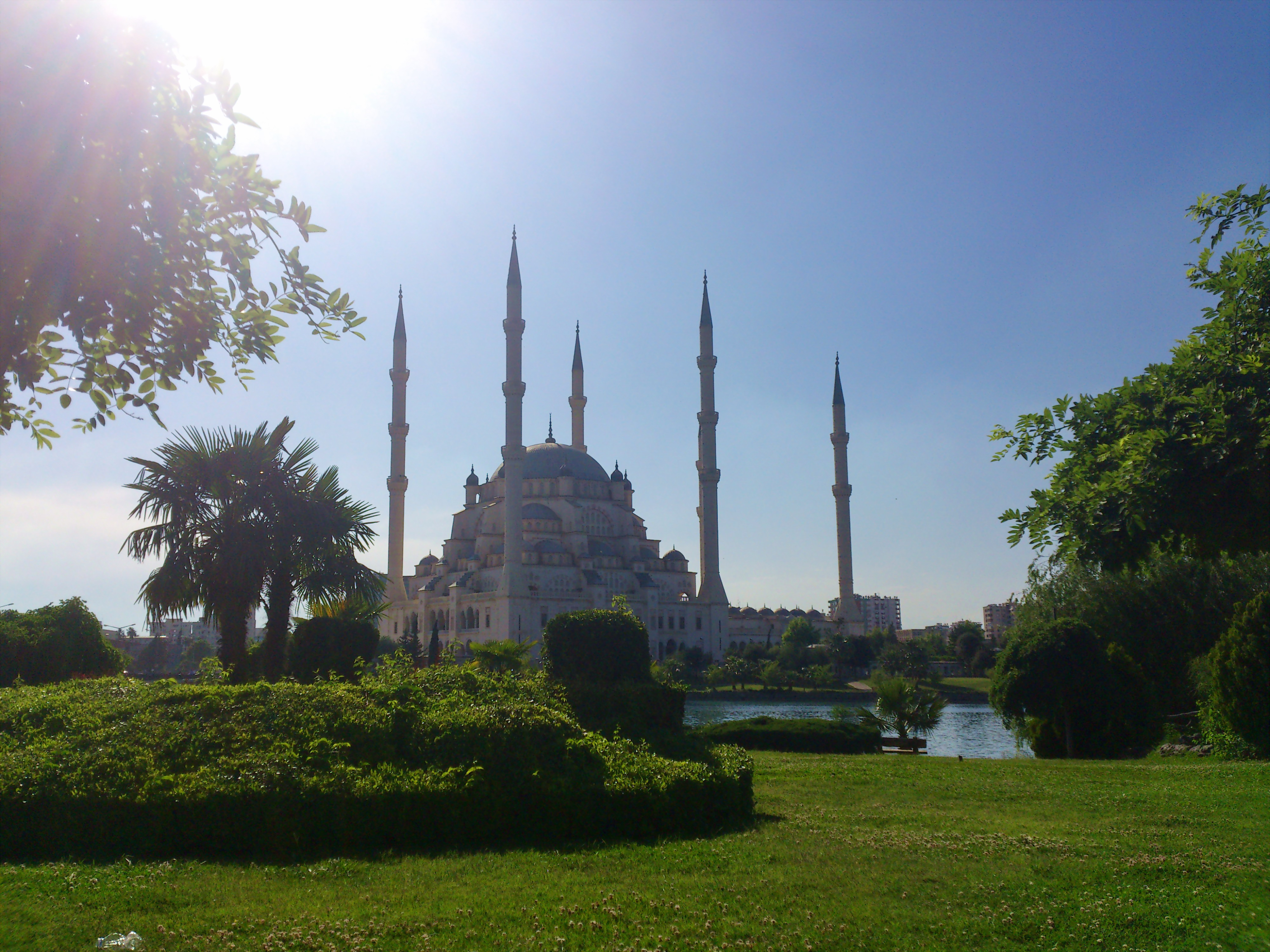

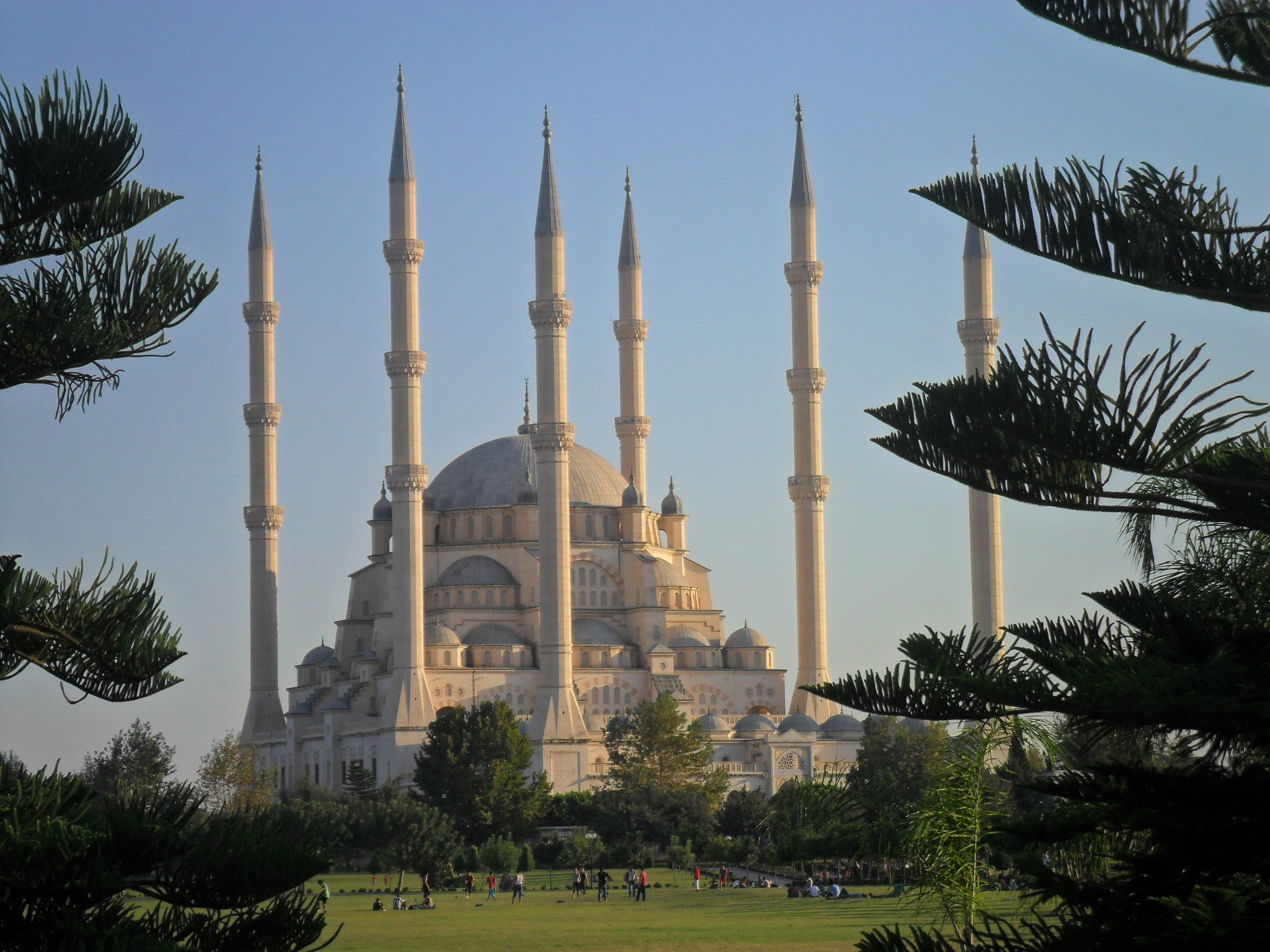

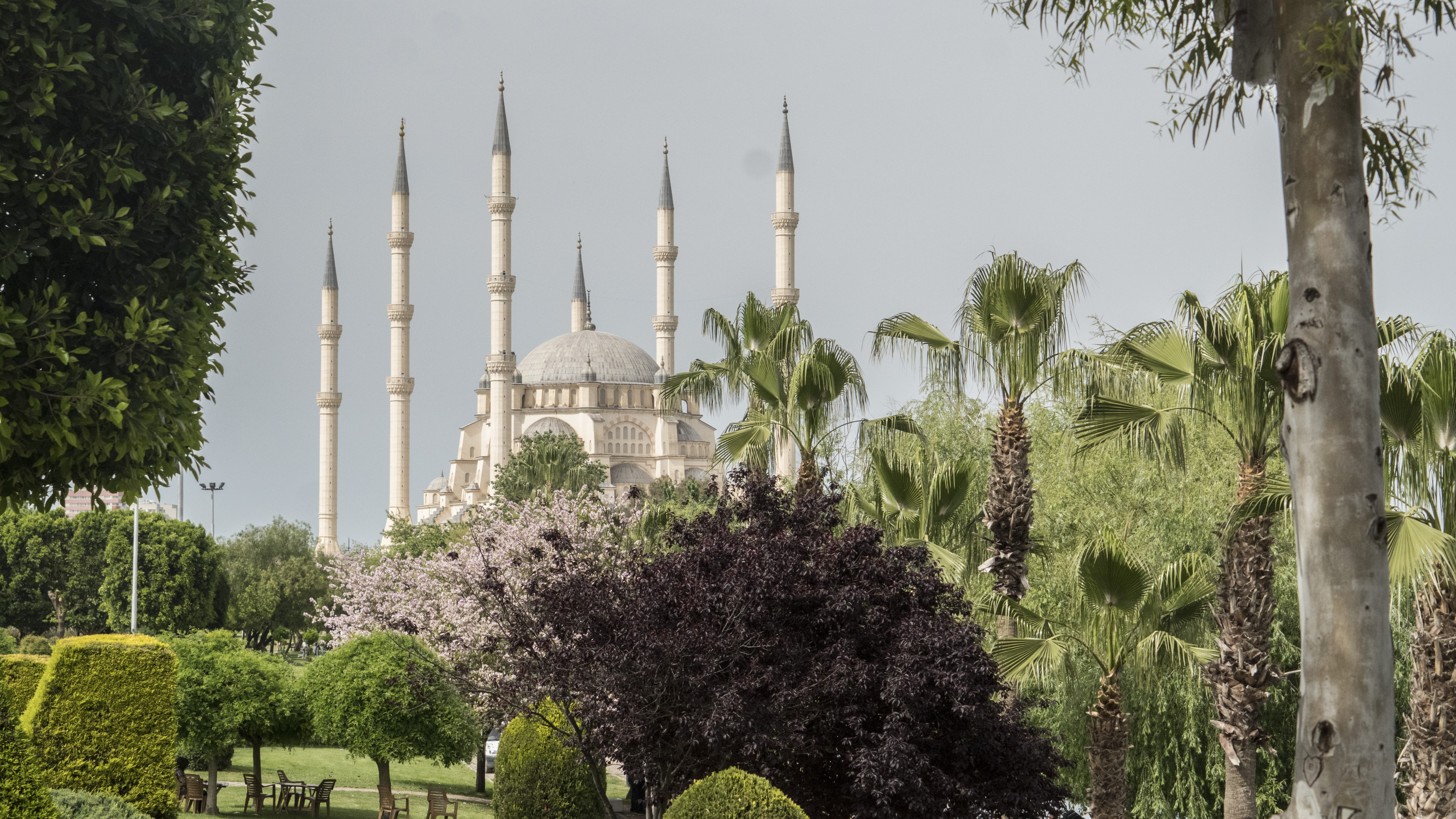

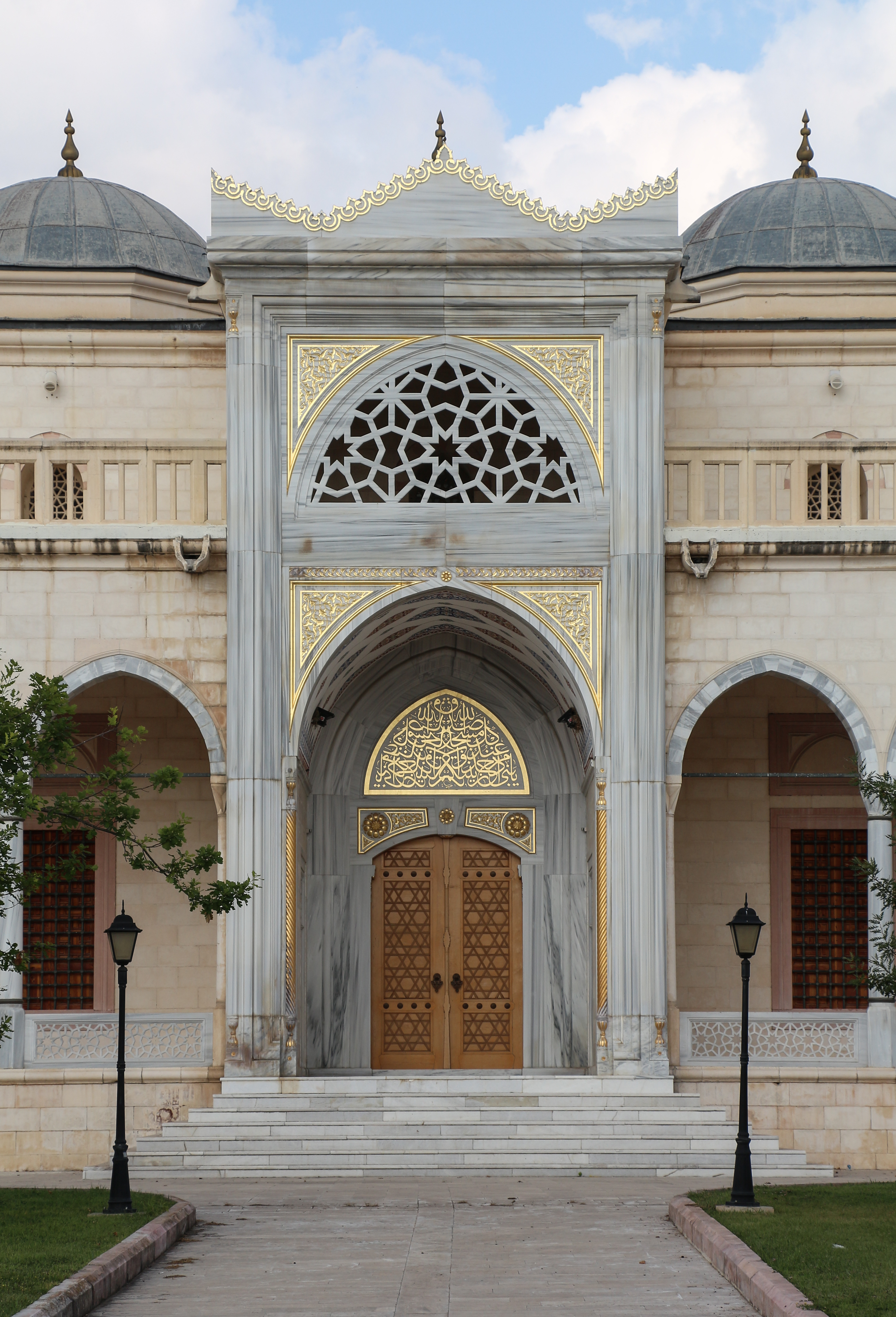
An entrance to the mosque

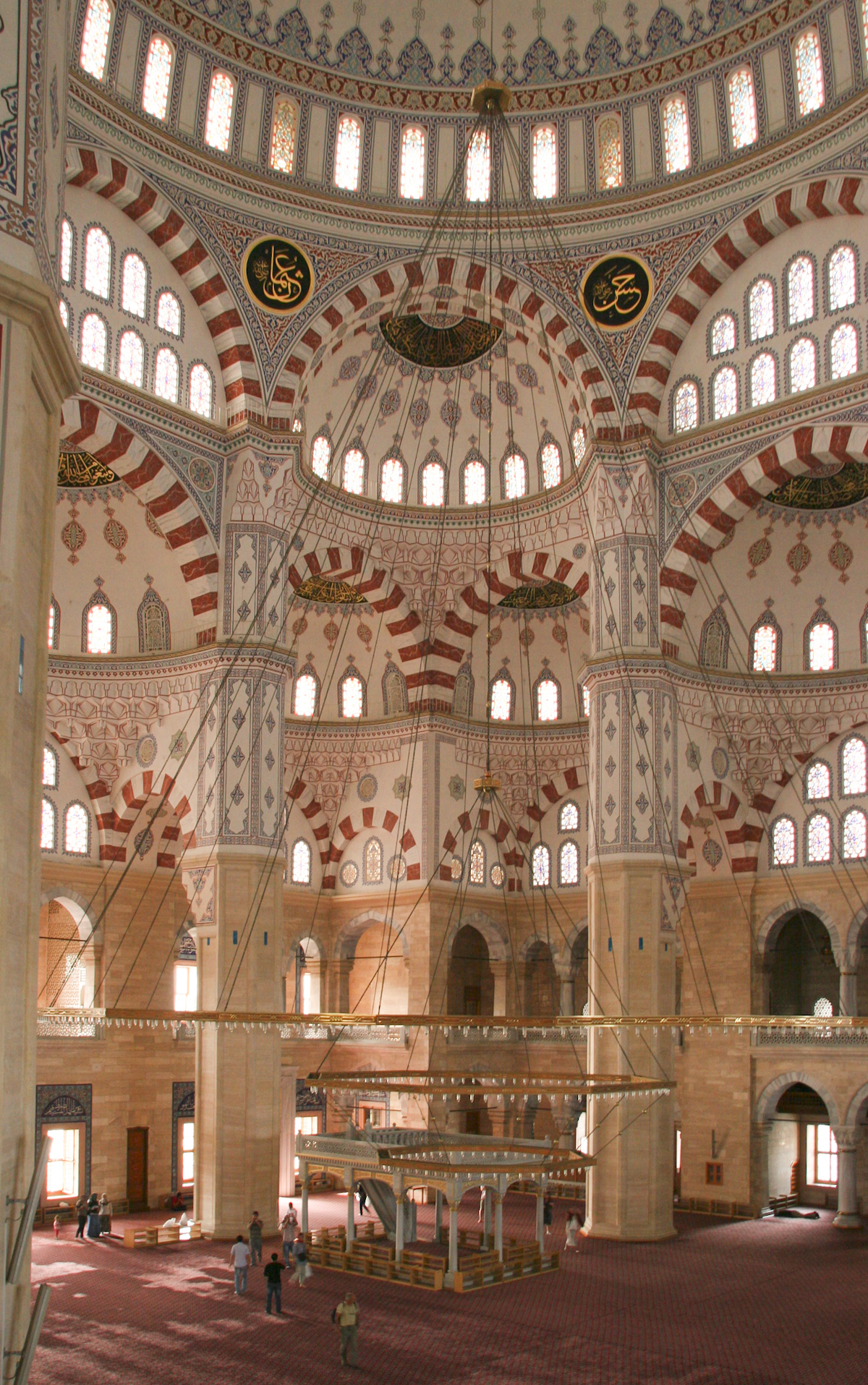
The interior of the mosque showing the symmetry of the mosque, the intricate artwork and calligraphy, and the decorative ablaq in the arches

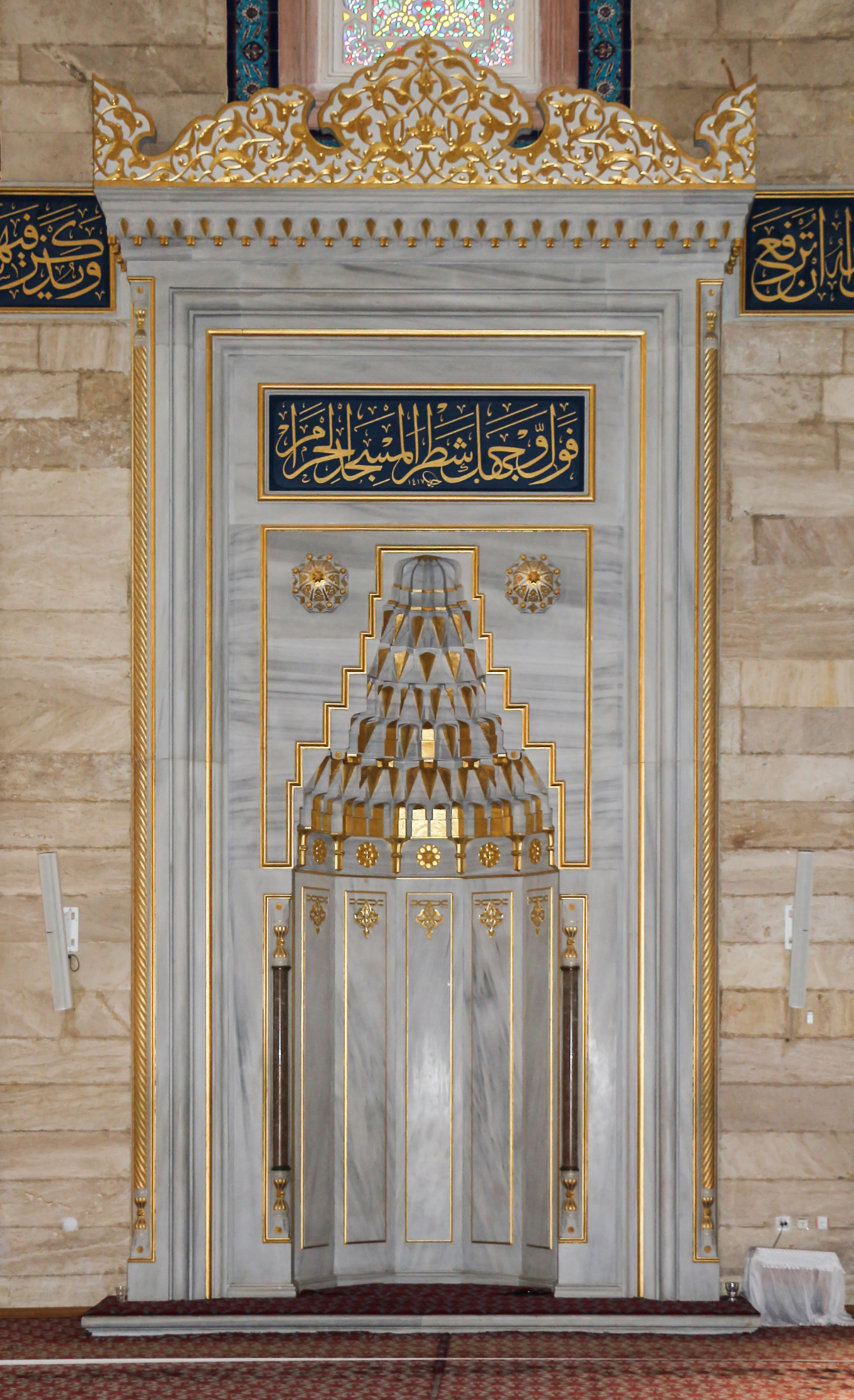
The mihrab of the mosque

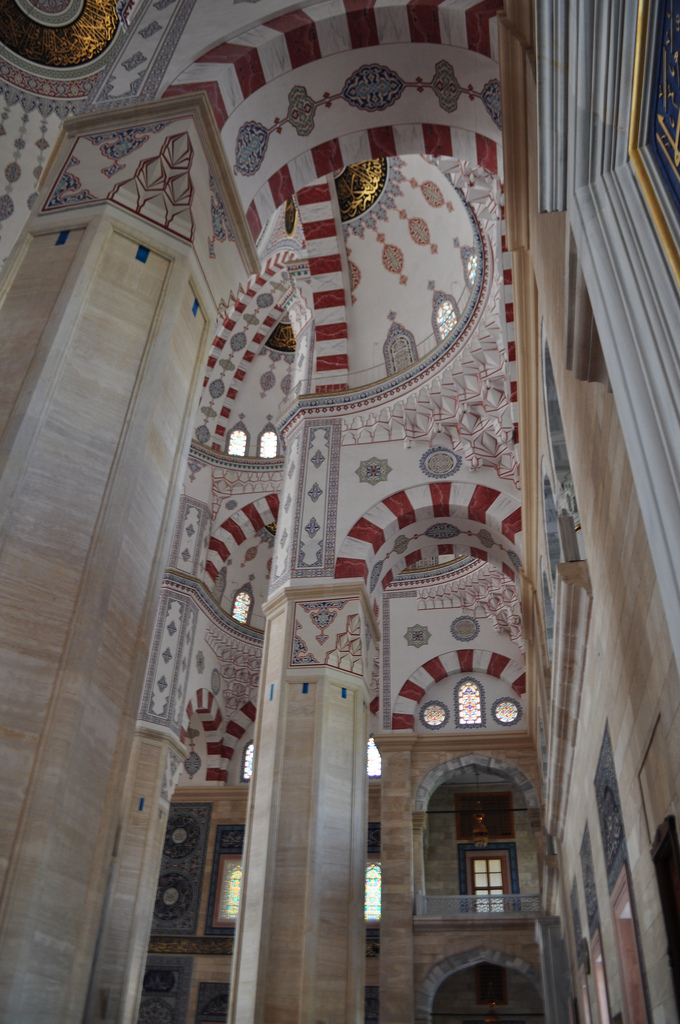
Details in the pillars of mosque, including red and white ablaq in the arches and muqarnas on the pillars and on the pendentives

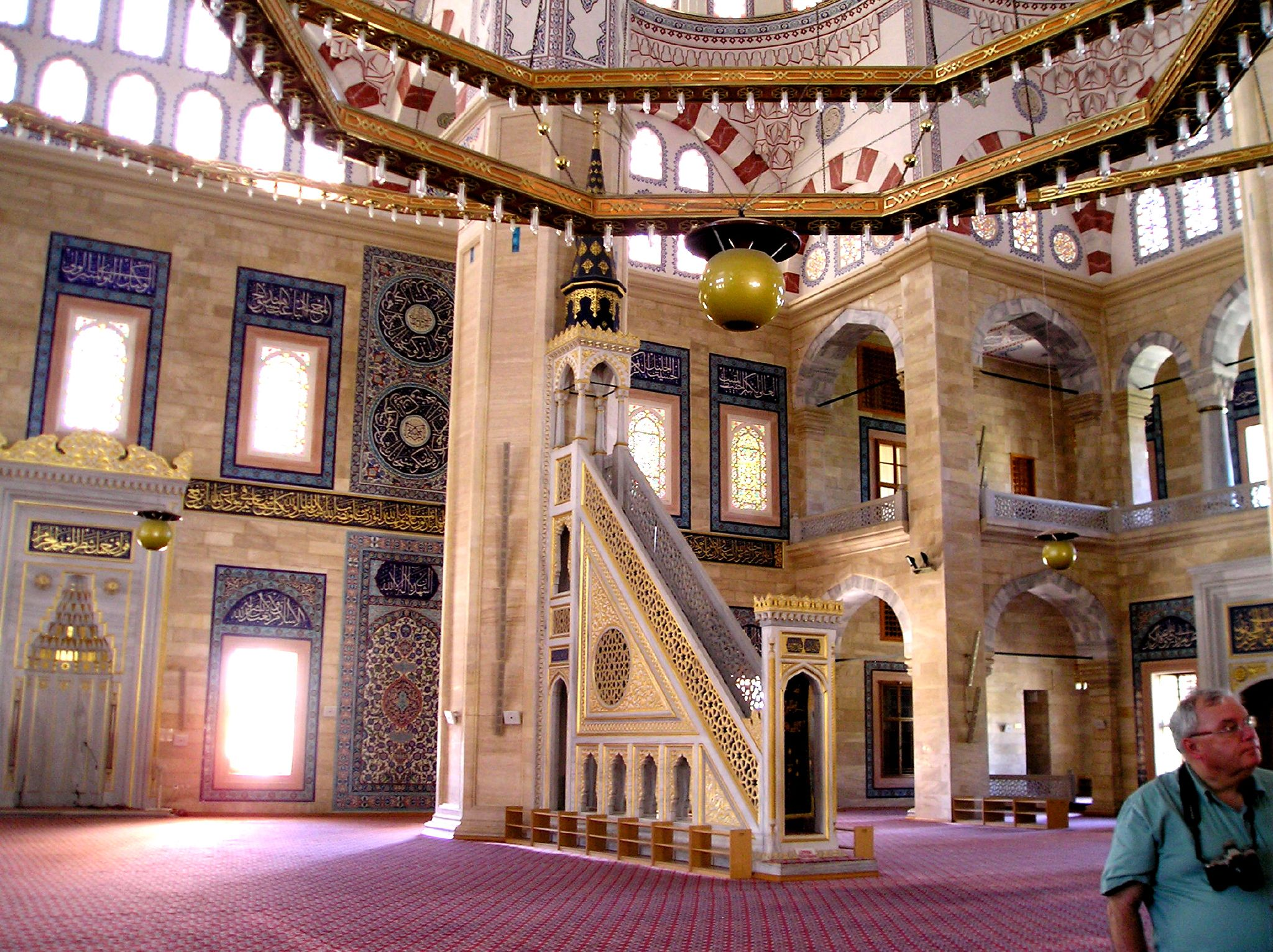
The minbar of the mosque with the mihrab on the left

== See also ==
- Ottoman architecture
