= 1099-OID fraud =

United States tax refund scam

1099-OID fraud is a tax scam in which filers submit fabricated Forms 1099-OID (Original Issue Discount) to the United States Internal Revenue Service (IRS) to eliminate tax liabilities or claim large, fraudulent tax refunds. While legitimate Forms 1099-OID are issued by financial institutions and bond issuers to report taxable income on discounted debt instruments, perpetrators of 1099-OID fraud prepare false forms themselves, often treating personal debts such as mortgages, loans, credit card balances, or everyday consumer spending as interest-bearing financial instruments - and report fictitious federal tax withholding in order to trigger a refund check from the U.S. Treasury.

Its origins lie in the redemption movement and sovereign citizen movement, many of whose adherents believe (incorrectly) that US citizens' birth certificates link to secret bank accounts which, with the correct procedures, people can access. More recently, promoters have marketed variations of the fraud in Canada and the United Kingdom.

The IRS classifies these schemes as legally frivolous positions subject to civil penalties, and has repeatedly featured the scam on its annual "Dirty Dozen" list of tax schemes. The U.S. authorities have prosecuted dozens of promoters and participants (and extradited foreign promoters) for wire fraud, conspiracy, and filing false claims.

== Background and mechanics ==
=== Legitimate use of Form 1099-OID ===
Under the Internal Revenue Code (26 U.S.C. § 1273), original issue discount (OID) is implicit interest resulting whenever a bond, note, certificate of deposit, or other debt instrument is issued at a discount (i.e. its price is lower than its redemption value. For example, if a company issues a bond with a $10,000 face value to an investor for a subscription price of $9,500, the $500 difference is OID. That $500 then generally accrues as taxable income over the life of the instrument.

US interest can be subject to withholding tax, and so can OID. The way this works is that the issuer or broker sends Form 1099-OID to the investor and the IRS to report the OID and the tax withheld. If the tax withheld by the payer exceeds the investor's actual US tax liability, the investor can file a federal income tax return to claim a credit or refund of the overpaid withholding.

=== How the fraud operates ===
In a 1099-OID fraud scheme, there's not actually a discounted debt security, and no tax has been withheld or paid to the IRS. Instead, the filer or a scheme promoter fabricates a Form 1099-OID (or related information returns) which falsely reports that a large amount of tax was withheld. The filer then submits a federal tax return, either for them personally or for a trust they created, claiming a cash refund for the fictitious "overpaid" withholding.

To calculate the fabricated figures, promoters typically instruct participants to tally up personal expenditures, such as amounts paid on mortgages and credit cards. This is then all claimed to generate withheld tax.

The large volumes of legitimate 1099-OID claims (mostly by financial institutions) mean that the IRS will sometimes pay out on a false refund claim. Promoters will then often display copies of their IRS refund check as "proof" that the scheme is lawful, to help recruit further paying clients.

== Pseudolegal theories ==
1099-OID fraud is closely tied to pseudolaw concepts developed by the American redemption movement, the sovereign citizen movement, and Commonwealth offshoots such as the freeman on the land movement. In the landmark 2012 Canadian court decision Meads v. Meads, Associate Chief Justice John D. Rooke described these kind of schemes as "Organized Pseudolegal Commercial Arguments" (OPCA) and "money for nothing" scams.

Promoters have advanced different rationales to convince their clients that filing false Forms 1099-OID is legal, involving either the existence of secret US Treasury accounts (which the forms will access) or that signing a loan creates "signature credit" for the bank (making the clients the issuer of a financial security).

Courts and tax authorities have uniformly rejected these arguments as legally baseless. As IRS guidance notes, Form 1099-OID requires a valid debt instrument, and cannot convert personal debt, consumer spending, or birth certificates into refundable federal tax credits.

== Enforcement and notable cases ==
=== IRS warnings and civil penalties ===
The IRS added 1099-OID schemes to its annual "Dirty Dozen" list of tax scams in the late 2000s, alerting taxpayers that fabricated information returns claiming false withholding credits were being used to justify bogus refund claims. The Department of Justice Tax Division regularly obtains civil injunctions under 26 U.S.C. § 7408 blocking the marketing of these schemes.

=== United States and Canadian prosecutions ===
Federal prosecutors and IRS Criminal Investigation have brought numerous criminal cases against 1099-OID promoters and high-dollar participants:

- Ronald L. Brekke and Canadian co-conspirators (2012–2018): On March 15, 2012, Ronald L. Brekke of Orange County, California, was convicted in federal court in Seattle of conspiracy and wire fraud, and was later sentenced to 12 years in prison. Brekke filed fraudulent U.S. tax returns for around 1,000 clients, mostly Canadians, and claimed $763 million in refunds.The IRS paid out $14 million before halting the scheme (with Brekke personally collecting $400,000 in fees). Several Canadians involved in the scheme were subsequently extradited and prosecuted in the United States.
- Judy Grace Sellers (2011–2024): Beginning in 2008, Florida sovereign citizen promoter Judy Grace Sellers operated the website `commercialredemption.com`, instructing customers to report mortgages, student loans, credit card debts, and court judgments on false Forms 1099-OID with 100% fictitious withholding. Following a 2011 civil injunction suit—in which the Justice Department alleged her customers had filed over $6 billion in false claims—Sellers was criminally indicted in 2014 for a conspiracy involving at least $3.4 million in fraudulent refund requests and for filing a retaliatory false lien against federal prosecutors.

=== United Kingdom cross-border schemes ===
In the 2020s, rival British pseudolaw groups began marketing U.S. 1099-OID refund schemes to residents of the United Kingdom.

In February 2026, the British think tank Tax Policy Associates, led by tax lawyer Dan Neidle, published an investigation into Empower the People, a UK unincorporated association led by former banker Simon Goldberg (who operates online as "The Spaniard"). According to Tax Policy Associates, the group charged UK members £1,300 upfront per tax year claimed - plus 13% of any payout - to submit fabricated 1099-OID claims through an anonymous preparer seeking around $1m in IRS cash refunds for everyday UK household spending. Goldberg denied being a sovereign citizen, and after YouTuber Salim Fadhley published videos criticizing the scheme in 2025, Goldberg initiated a private prosecution for harassment against him in Chelmsford Magistrates' Court.

Tax Policy Associates in May 2026, and The Guardian in November 2026, reported on a much larger cross-border scheme promoted by British former financial executive Iain Clifford Stamp (also known as Iain Clifford). The scheme charged thousands of pounds in "donations" to establish U.S. grantor trusts and file Forms 1099-OID claiming fictitious withholding based on members' historic UK mortgages, loans, and credit cards; Stamp stated that returns claiming $600 million had been filed across 3,000 trusts, and sent Tax Policy Associates an IRS transcript showing a $4.48 million claim for his own trust before the IRS froze payouts. Stamp maintained that the filings were lawful and blamed third parties (including Neidle) for the IRS freeze.

== See also ==
- Freeman on the land movement
- Frivolous tax arguments
- Original issue discount
- Pseudolaw
- Strawman theory
- Tax protester conspiracy arguments
