= Redemption movement =

Movement advocating fraudulent tax resistance and debt elimination schemes

The "redemption movement" is a fraudulent pseudolaw fringe ideology, mainly active in the United States and Canada, that promotes fraudulent debt and tax payment schemes. The movement is also called redemptionism. Redemption promoters allege that a secret fund is created for every citizen at birth and that a procedure exists to "redeem" or reclaim this fund to pay bills. Common redemption schemes include acceptance for value (A4V), Treasury Direct Accounts (TDA) and secured party creditor "kits," collections of pseudolegal tactics sold to participants despite a complete lack of any actual legal basis. Such tactics are sometimes called "money for nothing" schemes, as they propose to extract money from the government by using secret methods. The name of the A4V scheme in particular has become synonymous with the movement as a whole.

Although the movement has maintained a following since the 1990s, its theories are false and meritless. Those who participate in redemption schemes, and especially those who promote them to other people, can face criminal charges and imprisonment. Several government institutions, including the FBI, have issued warnings about the fraudulent character of redemption schemes.

The ideas of the redemption movement should not be confused with the actual legal right of redemption, under which a debtor may buy back property that has been levied or foreclosed, either by paying the balance of the debt or by matching the price at which the property sells.

The redemption movement overlaps with the sovereign citizen movement, with several influential sovereign citizens promoting redemption schemes and ideas. Part of its concepts were also adopted by the Canadian-born freeman on the land movement and by various other pseudolaw "gurus", movements and litigants.

== History ==
The redemption movement is an offshoot of the Posse Comitatus, an American far right organization which was established in 1969 by leaders of the white supremacist Christian Identity sect. The Posse's beliefs were rooted in antisemitism and they saw income tax, debt-based currency and debt collection as tools of Jewish control of the United States. It found an audience among farmers who were hit by an agricultural recession during the 1970s and 1980s.

One such supporter was Roger Elvick, a former North Dakota farmer who had lost his farm in a business deal. He became the national spokesman for the Committee of States, a Posse successor organization that engaged in open rebellion against tax authorities. According to the Anti-Defamation League, Elvick was associated with the Aryan Nations during the 1980s. Elvick sold a book, The Redemption Package, that encouraged people to claim large refunds and information rewards from the Internal Revenue Service (IRS) and then pay their debts with "sight drafts" (worthless checks) issued by his own company, Common Title Bond & Trust. Elvick was convicted and imprisoned for his activities, as were several of his accomplices.

Debt-cancellation schemes and prosecutions which were similar to Elvick's continued through the 1990s, including Family Farm Preservation and the Montana Freemen. Elvick resumed his activities after his release in 1997, giving seminars around the country, and the use of redemption schemes surged.

By the late 1990s, the belief in the existence of a secret bank account, attached to each individual and containing large sums of money, had become a fixture of redemption schemes. The origin of this idea is not clear, but elements of it appeared in Lodi v. Lodi (1981, Shasta County, California). In that case, plaintiff Oreste Lodi sued "Oreste Lodi, Beneficiary", produced a birth certificate as evidence that the defendant controlled his estate, and served his complaint upon the IRS. The Shasta County Superior Court dismissed plaintiff Lodi's case for failure to state a claim. An appeals court upheld the dismissal, agreeing that "Plaintiff's birth certificate did not create a charitable trust" and that the case was a "slam-dunk frivolous complaint".

Around 1999, Elvick conceived the strawman theory, which states that legal and financial claims brought against an individual are really claims against a fictitious legal person or "strawman". The theory builds on and ties together several pseudolegal concepts alleging that government authority is illegitimate, as well as monetary and banking conspiracy theories, and also incorporates the belief in a secret government-controlled bank account. The strawman, Elvick alleged, was in possession of the secret account, but the individual was its rightful owner and could petition for access.

The theory also gives a specific role to the Uniform Commercial Code, which provides an interstate standard for documents such as driver's licenses or for bank accounts. As sovereign citizens believe the UCC to be a codification of the illegitimate commercial law ruling the United States, adherents to the strawman theory see this as evidence that the associated laws and financial obligations do not apply to them, but instead to the "strawman".

The state of Ohio charged Elvick with corrupt business activity in 2003, and he returned to prison after being sentenced to four years.

Elvick's concepts and schemes and variations thereof have since remained a mainstay of the pseudolaw environment. They have been used and adapted in the United States, Canada and other English-speaking countries, by many tax protesters or conspiracy theorists, and more broadly by people seeking a remedy for their financial stresses or willing to fight what they perceive as government oppression. In some variations of the strawman theory, one's alleged secret fund is called a "Cestui Que Vie Trust".

== Purported redemption methods ==
The details of redemption schemes vary, but they typically rest on the same assumptions: (1) a distinction between a living individual and a corresponding legal person or "strawman", (2) valuable property associated with the legal person, but rightfully belonging to the individual, and (3) a supposed procedure by which the individual can claim the property to pay debts. Promoters justify these assumptions with elaborate historical tales. The most common explanation claims that the United States went bankrupt when it abandoned the gold standard in 1933 and started using its citizens as collateral so that it could borrow money.

Supposed procedures for using the nonexistent "strawman" funds include:

- Filing a UCC-1 financing statement or UCC-3 amended statement against the strawman
- Passing a birth certificate or other official document as if it were a bond
- Submitting documents to the Secretary of the Treasury
- Asserting copyright on a name
- Paying bills with self-printed or promoter-printed checks known as bills of exchange or sight drafts
- Charging bills to a "Treasury Direct Account" identified by a Social Security number
- Returning bills, collection letters and court notices with "Accepted for Value" or "Taken for Value" and other language stamped or written across them
- Reporting the funds as tax withheld via Form 1099-OID to offset tax liability (see also: 1099-OID fraud)
- Corresponding with red ink

Promoters may suggest that others have had great success in eliminating their debts through these methods, and put the blame on participants when they do not get the same results.

== Official responses ==
The United States government has successfully prosecuted and convicted a number of redemption scheme participants. The convictions include forgery, providing false information, passing fictitious financial instruments, defrauding the United States, counterfeiting, impeding administration, filing false tax returns, money laundering and wire fraud.

Aside from the risk of criminal charges, redemption processes also fail to discharge debts. In a frequently cited 2007 foreclosure case, a debtor attempted to pay her home mortgage with a redemption "bill of exchange" at the suggestion of promoter Barton Buhtz. A United States District Court concluded that "the legal authorities Plaintiff cites and the facts she alleges suggest that she did not tender payment, but rather a worthless piece of paper. Other courts addressing claims nearly identical to Plaintiff's have found likewise."

To caution people away from redemption schemes, several U.S. agencies have issued warnings against them. Both the Federal Bureau of Investigation (FBI) and the TreasuryDirect web site have posted statements that redemption schemes are fraudulent. The Inspector General of the Treasury, the Federal Trade Commission, and various Federal Reserve Banks have warned that the Treasury and the Federal Reserve Banks do not maintain draft accounts for individuals and will not honor any individual drafts.

The IRS has announced that attributing tax liability to a "strawman" is a frivolous position that can result in a $5,000 administrative penalty. It included the Form 1099-OID variation of the redemption scheme in its "Dirty Dozen" list of prominent tax scams every year from 2009 to 2019. The Comptroller of the Currency has noted that, in addition to being fraudulent and ineffective, redemption schemes can be used for identity theft. Outside the United States, the Reserve Bank of New Zealand responded to a 2017 information request by stating that birth certificates are not investment securities and that redemption processes are scams.

== Promoters ==
=== Roger Elvick ===
The originator of the movement, Roger Elvick, was found guilty in June 1991 by a federal jury in Hawaii of conspiracy to impede justice in connection with federal tax filings under 18 U.S.C. § 371. He was fined $100,000, and was sentenced to five years in federal prison and three years of supervised release. While incarcerated he was further convicted in another conspiracy. He served his time and was released from the federal prison system on December 8, 1997.

Upon release from prison, Elvick restarted the scheme and resumed holding Redemption seminars. In August 2003, he was indicted in Ohio on multiple felony counts. During preliminary hearings, Elvick denied his identity and argued that the court had no jurisdiction over him or his strawman. The court ruled him mentally unfit to stand trial and committed him to a correctional psychiatric facility. There, he was diagnosed with an "unclassified mental disorder" and underwent nine months of treatment before facing trial. Elvick eventually pled guilty; in April 2005, he was convicted of forgery, extortion and corrupt business activity and sentenced to four years.

=== Eldon Warman ===
In the late 1990s, several concepts of the movement, as well as sovereign citizen ideology, were introduced into Canada by Eldon Warman, a follower of Elvick who adapted the theories to better suit a Canadian context and promoted through seminars and his Detax Canada website. However, he did not use the "redemption" and "A4V" concepts themselves. Warman, who died in 2017, was emulated by several other Canadian "gurus" within the so-called "Detaxer" movement. Though the Detaxer movement eventually went into decline, it influenced the freeman on the land movement, which made little conceptual innovation but found success through the use of social media, also reframing Detaxer ideas for a more left-leaning audience. The freeman on the land movement later expanded to other Commonwealth countries.

=== Barton Buhtz ===
During the early 2000s redemption promoter Barton Buhtz, a former radio broadcaster who had previously worked for Family Radio and for KDNO, distributed bills of exchange to clients, telling them they could be used for debt payments. In October 2007 he was convicted on multiple counts of conspiring, aiding, and personally passing fictitious financial instruments, and sentenced to three years in prison. He was released in November 2012.

=== Sam Kennedy (Glenn Unger) ===
One key figure of the redemption movement has been Glenn Richard Unger, best known under the alias Sam Kennedy, who hosted the Take No Prisoners program on Republic Broadcasting Network in Round Rock, Texas. He was a founding member of the Guardians of the Free Republics. In a mass e-mail early in 2010, Unger vowed to use his show to present a "final remedy to the enslavement at the hands of corporations posing as legitimate government." He pointed to a plan to "end economic warfare and political terror by March 31, 2010." In two months, he said, "we can and WILL, BE FREE with your assistance."

In 2013, Unger was tried in the United States District Court for the Northern District of New York, in Albany, New York, on one count of attempting to interfere with the administration of the U.S. internal revenue laws, four counts of filing false claims for over $36 million in tax refunds, one count of tax evasion, and one count of uttering a fictitious obligation. Unger was convicted of multiple counts of tax fraud and served approximately five years of an eight-year prison sentence.

=== Winston Shrout ===
Winston Shrout, a former construction worker and prominent sovereign citizen and tax protester from Oregon, started practicing redemption schemes in 2000. By 2004, he was marketing the schemes under the name "Solutions in Commerce". Shrout built a following on social media to become a leading redemption promoter, holding seminars in the United Kingdom, Australia and New Zealand. During the same period he also attempted to pass billion- and trillion-dollar "bills of exchange" on the IRS and various financial companies. Shrout supplemented his pseudolegal and pseudofinancial theories with claims about UFOs and paranormal issues. He created another website, "Exo-Commerce", which blended sovereign citizen and New Age concepts. At one point, he claimed to be an "Earth delegate to the interdimensional Galactic Round Table" and a "sixth-dimensional interplanetary diplomat" and to have disrupted international transactions by relocating the prime meridian with the assistance of the "Queen of the Fairies".

Shrout was indicted on 19 charges of passing fictitious instruments and failure to file federal income tax returns. He was convicted on all charges in April 2017, and was sentenced to ten years in prison. Shrout failed to surrender to authorities at the Federal Bureau of Prisons to begin his sentence and remained a fugitive until November 2019, when he was arrested in Arizona.

=== Heather Ann Tucci-Jarraf ===
Heather Ann Tucci-Jarraf, a licensed lawyer and former state prosecutor, became a member of the sovereign citizen movement. With several associates, she created a group called the One People’s Public Trust (OPPT) that claimed around 2012 to have "foreclosed" governments, corporations, and banks through US Uniform Commercial Code filings. She also said that the OPPT's subscribers would receive $10 billion in gold and could pay their debts by using "Courtesy Notice" documents. When the money was not delivered to their followers, the OPPT claimed that it was being held by aliens. After the failure of that original scheme, Tucci-Jarraf maintained an online following as a sovereign citizen "guru". She asserted that people could reclaim the funds from their alleged "secret savings account" by taking money from the Federal Reserve. The OPPT was also involved in developing "free energy technologies" in Morocco.

One of Tucci-Jarraf's followers, Randall Beane, devised an Internet fraud scheme aimed at extracting from the banking system tens of millions of dollars he believed were part of his secret account. Tucci-Jarraf was aware of Beane's fraud and gave him legal advice throughout. Beane managed to embezzle two million dollars from a bank before he and Tucci-Jarraf were arrested in July 2017. Upon arrest, Beane named Tucci-Jarraf as his lawyer before police determined that she was an accomplice. Tucci-Jarraf was arrested days later in Washington, D.C., after arriving unannounced at the White House's gate to demand a meeting with then-President Donald Trump. In January 2018, Beane was found guilty of wire fraud and bank fraud; together with Tucci-Jarraf, he was also found guilty of conspiracy to launder money. Beane was sentenced to 155 months in prison and Tucci-Jarraf to 57 months. Despite her imprisonment, Tucci-Jarraf's methodology was emulated by multiple people and she received many Internet donations. The OPPT is still active as of 2019: some of its ideology and methods have influenced the German Reichsbürger movement, as well as Italian sovereign citizens.

== See also ==
- "Capital letters" argument
- Cheque fraud
- Debt evasion
- Freeman on the land movement
- NESARA
- Paper terrorism
- Patriot movement
- Pseudolaw
- Sovereign citizen movement
- Swissindo
- Tax protester
- Tax resistance
