= Swissindo =

Scam about debt relief

Swissindo World Trust International Orbit
- Coat of arms
- Headquarters: Cirebon, West Java, Indonesia
- Languages: Indonesian, English
- Type: Debt elimination scam

Leaders
  - Leader ‘Royal K.681 M1’: Sino Soegihartonotonegoro

Establishment
  - Founded: 2010
- Website http://wke-uns.info

Swissindo (formally the Swissindo World Trust International Orbit, also known as UN Swissindo or NEO the United Kingdom of God Sky Earth) is a debt relief scheme widely classified as a cult and a scam. It is led by a man named Sino Soegihartonotonegoro and describes itself as a financial organization working towards "eliminating the debt of everyone on Earth". The group is headquartered in West Java, Indonesia, and has members across the United States, Australia, Africa, Asia and Europe. Due to its financial practices, the Cirebon office of the Financial Services Authority has conducted an investigation into Swissindo. The organisation targets poor and marginalised communities.

Swissindo's practices have been compared to those of sovereign citizens and the redemption movement. Using a concept first promulgated in Meads v. Meads, legal practitioner Donald Netolitzky argues in the Alberta Law Review that Swissindo employs organised pseudolegal commercial arguments (OPCA). Soegihartonotonegoro claims to hold sovereign authority over the United Nations, which is categorically denied by the United Nations.

== Mission ==
=== Ideology and practices ===
Swissindo's ideology appears to be inspired by the influx of anti-financial establishment cults during the 2008 financial crisis. The organisation views debt as a form of worldwide slavery that all people require liberation from. Swissindo's founder Sino assigns his followers with roles in his global movement. For instance, Kimarie Teter is the “Prime Minister of Love for United States”. Australian delegates include the “Empress of Australia to Prime Minister”. Once recruited, members are expected to attract other debt-laden individuals to join Swissindo.

In July 2019, Swissindo announced in a press release that they would be co-operating with the Diruna cryptocurrency to release their purported UBI payments.

=== Beliefs ===
Swissindo asserts that Sino owns the United Nations, Vatican City, Interpol and all of the world's militaries. As such, Sino has threatened the Indonesia Financial Crimes Agency (OJK) with nuclear war if they continue to investigate his organisation, despite Swissindo not being known to possess nuclear weapons.

Swissindo's followers believe Sino's mass wealth consists of 78 million tonnes of gold and platinum worth “one Quintillion USD”. It is claimed that this treasure originates from the combined wealth of the Asian dynasties during the Majapahit era.

Swissindo's followers believe in the emergence of a global government led by Sino. It is dubbed the 'Grand Acclamation'.

== Leader ==
Sino Soegihartonotonegoro, aged 52, claims to be the founder and leader of UN Swissindo. Prior to Swissindo's establishment, Sino claims to have been an architect. Sino allegedly plans to distribute US$6 million to every individual once the global financial institutions are defeated. However, he supposedly cannot showcase his fortune as he receives constant death threats and fears his enemies may steal it . Swissindo's followers believe that Sino is a direct descendant of King Solomon and is proclaimed by God as the saviour of the world. Sino threatens banks that do not honour his certifications with 100 years imprisonment or a US$1000 trillion fine. It is claimed that Queen Elizabeth II has sanctioned these penalties.

Swissindo's website claims that prior to his death, President Sukarno appointed a 'Son of the Nation' by instructing his lawyer to transfer his mission to Sino. This is justified by Sino's birth on June 2, 1970, nineteen days before Sukarno's death. It is claimed that Sino was chosen at birth as a prophet and king, proclaimed to save the world with his upmost authority and power.

In 2018, it was reported that the Indonesian National Police had arrested Sino for the illegal practices carried out by UN Swissindo.

== Influence ==
=== Global impact ===
The organisation possesses a global influence with followers from Australia, the US, Latin America, South Africa, Indonesia, Laos and The Netherlands. In each of these nations, delegates are appointed to positions such as “Prime Minister of Love for United States”. It is reported that the role of delegates is to distribute Sino's money within these nations. One such delegate is Kimarie Teter, a recruit from California, who is a devout follower of Swissindo. Teter grew frustrated with the Internal Revenue Service's (IRS) demands that she pay her debt exceeding $10,000. She claims that Swissindo successfully eliminated her debt and that the IRS no longer contacts her. This process involved sending Swissindo her birth certificate and $400. Teter continues to promote Swissindo's publications on her Facebook account.

Swissindo also has high-profile members. Former Australian politician Ann Bressington is a known member of the cult and has acted as the “United Nations Special Operations Executive of Swissindo”.

There has been documentation of Swissindo vouchers being used at banks in western Java, Sulawesi and Sumatra. The OJK have received various complaints that Swissindo members are intimidating banks and their employees.

=== Media coverage ===
UN Swissindo has attracted widespread media coverage on a global scale. Vice Media's documentary, The Cult of Debt Forgiveness, has amassed in excess of 500,000 views and 1,200 comments on YouTube. This documentary includes an interview with Sino, in which he outlines his philosophy. The entity has also been covered by a diverse range of newspapers including The Australian, CNN Indonesia, South Africa's City Press and Tempo. Swissindo has been branded as a pyramid scheme and has been criticisized for its recruitment of vulnerable individuals.

Academic research has also been conducted into the organisation. Herawan Sauni's and Dimas Dwi Arso's article The Roles of Otoritas Jasa Keuangan to Overcome Fictive Investment outlines the role of the Otoritas Jasa Keuangan (OJK) in investigating and preventing fictitious investment in Bengkulu. The article contains a section analysing the OJK's investigation into Swissindo.

== Response ==
=== Indonesian law enforcement ===
The Cirebon office of the Financial Services Authority (OJK) investigated Swissindo for alleged breaches of financial and criminal law. The OJK refutes Sino's claims and brands Swissindo as a scam that targets vulnerable, desperate and poor individuals.

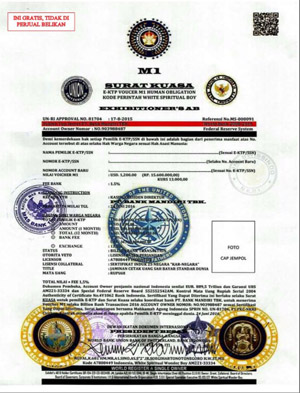
A master bond that purports to entitle the bearer to a universal basic income of $1,200 a month.

The OJK reports that Swissindo followers were provided with vouchers that supposedly allow them to collect US$1,200 (Rp. 15.6 million) from the Bank Mandiri. This practice began on June 6, 2017. However, the OJK's chairman has confirmed that the vouchers are not legitimate financial documents.

The activities carried out by the Swissindo National Examination are not true, because the repayment letter issued is not recognized by financial service institutions and the vouchers provided cannot be disbursed at Bank Mandiri.

— Tongam L. Tobing

The Investment Alert Task Force, National Police Bareskrim and Bank Indonesia have summoned Sino to a number of meetings. The Task Force obtained an agreement that Swissindo would cease all activities relating to debt relief documentation, an apology from Sino for the unrest caused by Swissindo's practices and a request for Sino's statements to be made public. Despite his assertions that Swissindo will stop issuing the M1 Master Bond, the cult has continued to operate.

The OJK has urged individuals to only invest their money in companies that have acquired a business license from authorised agencies and a permit to offer investment products. The Financial Services Authority also warned the public to be cautious when any entity promises debt relief.

=== United Nations ===
The United Nations has received informal reports of UN Swissindo's actions in South Africa and reported them to local law enforcement. In a press release, the UN branded Swissindo as a scam, affirmed that the UN does not charge a fee for humanitarian work and aimed to make it "categorically clear" that UN Swissindo is not part of the United Nations. It also urged the public to immediately report matters in which they are being asked to provide a fee for humanitarian work to their local authorities.

There are many people around the world who come up with schemes on how to exploit the name of the UN to swindle innocent people of their money. South Africa is not an exception.

— United Nations

=== South African National Civic Organisation ===
The South African National Civic Organisation (SANCO) has foiled several SANCO impersonators from recruiting new Swissindo members. The impersonators valued the recruitment process at a total price of R50. This consisted of R20 being charged for photos, R20 for certificates of application and R10 for the creation of email addresses. One such impersonator insisted that Swissindo applicants received R17,000 to R23,000 a month depending on their age. SANCO were highly critical of Swissindo actions, condemning the impersonation of their organisation for the purpose of misleading vulnerable individuals. These individuals included the elderly, young people and children as low as six years of age. SANCO has communicated with local South African media to warn potential victims of these fraudulent practices.

It cannot be correct that people use our name to rob our people in a country that has high unemployment rate. If we do work for our communities, we do it for free.

— SANCO

=== Membership ===
==== Targeting marginalised communities ====
Swissindo's followers have alleged that they were charged a “few million” rupiah for the M1 Master Bond, a voucher that the OJK has confirmed the illegitimate nature of. The debt elimination process supposedly costs US$400. The issuing of M1 Master Bonds has sparked controversy as Swissindo has reportedly targeted in excess of 500,000 individuals living in poverty. Former members have stated that their association with Swissindo has contributed to divorces, business failures and financial issues.

== See also ==
- Keraton Agung Sejagat
- NESARA
- Pseudolaw
- Redemption movement
