= RBN =

RBN may refer to:

- Rajah Broadcasting Network, a television and radio network in the Philippines
- Random boolean network, a model in statistical physics where the nodes of graph carry a Boolean value
- Rejoice Broadcast Network, a Christian network in Pensacola, Florida
- Reliance Broadcast Network, India
- Republic Broadcasting Network, a satellite, shortwave, and Internet radio operation in Texas
- Reverse Beacon Network, a radio wave propagation discovery tool for Amateur Radio
- Rock Band Network, a downloadable content service
- Royal Brunei Navy, and also the associated prefix for ships of the navy
- Russian Business Network, a Russian ISP openly engaged in criminal activities
