= Kerajaan Ubur-Ubur =

Indonesian society

Kerajaan Ubur-Ubur is a society founded by Rudi and Aisyah, a married couple from Serang, Banten, Indonesia, who claimed to be a manifestation of the goddess Nyi Roro Kidul. Most of their followers come from East Java and Central Java. Majelis Ulama Indonesia from Serang, Indonesia's senior Islamic scholars' body, accused the association of heresy.

== See also ==
- Sunda Empire
