= Family Farm Preservation =

Family Farm Preservation was a right-wing agrarian populist organisation in the United States which promoted a grass-roots movement in order to prevent family farms from being foreclosed upon. The group has been linked to the earlier right-wing organization Posse Comitatus, and in some reports is alleged to be a direct outgrowth.

In a 1995 interview, an FFP worker stated that the FFP, though not religious, was a Christian and spiritual organization which sought to educate the public on their legal rights. Among their beliefs was the illegitimacy of lawyers, as the Bar association was chartered by the British monarchy, the illegitimacy of property taxes, and that most authority held by government officials is in violation of 1872 law. The member, Ramsden, stated that the goal of the FFP is that "society should be just as it was after the Revolutionary War."

== Notable affiliates ==
Though not concretely linked to FFP, Terry Nichols, accomplice of Oklahoma City bomber Timothy McVeigh, used the FFP's concept in employing a pseudo-check labeled "Fractional Reserve Notes" to pay off credit card debts.

== See also ==
- Sovereign citizen movement
- Redemption movement
- Pseudolaw
