= A4V =

A4V may refer to:

- A4V mutation, which causes amyotrophic lateral sclerosis (ALS)
- Acceptance for value or Accepted for value, a scam used by the sovereign citizen movement and redemption movement
