= NESARA =

1990s set of proposed US economic reforms and associated conspiracy theory

The National Economic Security and Recovery Act (NESARA) is a set of proposed economic reforms for the United States suggested by private citizen Harvey Francis Barnard during the 1990s. Barnard claimed that the proposals, which included replacing the income tax with a national sales tax, abolishing compound interest on secured loans, and returning to a bimetallic currency, would result in 0% inflation and a more stable economy. The proposals were never introduced in Congress.

Since the early 2000s, NESARA has become better known as the subject of a cult-like conspiracy theory whose original promoter was Internet personality Shaini Candace Goodwin, better known as "Dove of Oneness". Goodwin, who appropriated NESARA without Barnard's consent, claimed that the act was secretly passed with additional provisions as the National Economic Security and Reformation Act, and then had its implementation suppressed by the George W. Bush administration and the Supreme Court following the September 11 attacks. Goodwin's conspiracy emails were translated into several languages and had a large following online. Adherents of the theory have also used the term GESARA (standing for either Global Economic Security and Recovery Act or Global Economic Security and Reformation Act) to extend the proposed NESARA reforms internationally.

== Monetary reform proposal ==
Harvey Francis Barnard (1941–2005), an engineering consultant and teacher with a PhD in systems theory, created the NESARA proposal during the late 1980s and early 1990s. Barnard printed 1,000 copies of his proposal, titled Draining the Swamp: Monetary and Fiscal Policy Reform (1996), and sent copies to members of Congress, believing it would pass quickly on its merits. Based on a theory that debt is the number one economic factor inhibiting the growth of the economy, and compound interest the number one "moral evil" and reason for debt, Barnard made several other attempts during the 1990s to draw political attention to the problems he saw in the US economy, and his suggested economic recovery proposal based on the root causes he determined. After Barnard's efforts to gain political support did not succeed, he decided in 2000 to release his proposal to the public domain and publish it on the Internet. Barnard established the NESARA Institute in 2001, and published the second edition of his book in 2005, retitling it Draining the Swamp: The NESARA Story – Monetary and Fiscal Policy Reform.

== Conspiracy theory ==
=== Dove of Oneness ===
Soon after Barnard released NESARA on the Internet, a user known as "Dove of Oneness" began posting about it in forums and eventually created a website devoted to it. "Dove of Oneness" was later identified as Shaini Candace Goodwin, a former student of Ramtha's School of Enlightenment. Goodwin claimed that the NESARA bill languished in Congress before finally being passed by a secret session in March 2000 and signed by President Bill Clinton. Her theory held that the new law was to be implemented at 10 a.m. on September 11, 2001, but that the data on the beneficiaries of the trillions of dollars of "Prosperity funds" were destroyed on the second floor of one of the World Trade Center towers in New York City during the terrorist attacks. Supposedly an earlier gag order issued by the Supreme Court had prohibited any official or private source from discussing it, under penalty of death. Goodwin referred to "White Knights," most of them high-ranking military officials, who have since been struggling to have the law implemented despite opposition by President George W. Bush. Goodwin purported that Bush orchestrated the September 11 attacks and the Iraq War to prevent the implementation of NESARA.

Goodwin's description of NESARA goes far beyond Barnard's proposal by cancelling all personal debts, abolishing the Internal Revenue Service, declaring world peace, and requiring new presidential and congressional elections. Goodwin often claimed that the Bush administration was attempting to sabotage her web site to prevent her from publicizing the law. She would purport to be connected with powerful officials and published messages "ordering" the "White Knights" to enforce NESARA.

Goodwin began commenting on NESARA in connection to Omega Trust, an investment fraud scheme whose creator Clyde Hood was on trial at the time. According to Goodwin, Omega Trust investors would receive their returns after NESARA was promulgated. Goodwin repeatedly predicted that the NESARA announcement would occur in the very near future, although in later years she became more reserved in these predictions.

Barnard became aware of Goodwin's description of NESARA before his death in 2005. He denied that NESARA had been enacted into law or even assigned a tracking number, and condemned Goodwin's allegations as a disinformation campaign.

Goodwin promoted the NESARA theory until her death in 2010.

=== Further developments ===
After Goodwin began commenting on NESARA, other Internet-based conspiracy theorists latched onto it. One supporter, Sheldan Nidle, ties the imminent NESARA announcement into his years-old prophecy of an imminent large scale UFO visitation by benevolent aliens (occasionally on his website reports, but more prominently in his videos, seminars and public appearances). Jennifer Lee, who published NESARA status reports almost daily on her now-defunct site, discussed a host of other-worldly and "interdimensional" beings who are helping behind the scenes to get NESARA announced. Late Internet conspiracy theorist Sherry Shriner, who operated multiple websites, saw NESARA as linked to malevolent reptiloid aliens she asserted long controlled the U.S. government.

Some NESARA supporters also claim that otherworldly beings are working to get NESARA announced. These include a "channeled" cosmic being called "Hatonn" (an android Pleiadean), and another named "Sananda". According to some proponents of Ascended Master Teachings, such as Joshua David Stone, Sheldan Nidle, and Luis Prada, "Sananda" is the "galactic name" of Ascended Master Jesus, which he uses in his role as Commander-in-Chief of the Ashtar Command flying saucer fleet. "Pallas Athena" is regarded as being the Vice-Commander of the saucer fleet. Ashtar (Ashtar Sheran) is regarded in these teachings as being third-in-command. The designation of George W. Bush as a disguised reptilian often co-occurred with this claim. Goodwin has claimed that Ascended Master Saint Germain came down from the etheric plane to physically meet with heads of banks and world leaders regarding the NESARA announcement.

Followers of the NESARA conspiracy theory began using the name "GESARA" in the mid-2010s, standing for "Global Economic Security and Reformation Act". They notably claimed that several East Asian groups were involved in enforcing the reforms worldwide, including the purported "White Dragon Society" which would benefit from fundings by "the successors of the last Chinese Emperor, Pu Yi". One prominent advocate of "GESARA" has been a blogger based in the UK and going by the name "Alcuin Bramerton". In 2020, "Bramerton" asserted that the "NESARA global prosperity programmes" were about to be announced and activated through an entity called the "Saint Germain World Trust" which would provide "one quattuordecillion US dollars" to "zero out (permanently cancel) all personal, corporate and national debts worldwide" and that further money would be provided to the "White Dragon Society" by the "Manchu family syndicate". (One quattuordecillion is a trillion trillion trillion, compared to US GDP of about $30 trillion.)

NESARA groups have been documented in Utah, and the Netherlands. Members of these groups discuss the status and reports on NESARA, hold protests, and pass out fliers to the public. Goodwin claimed NESARA groups exist in several nations and US states including California, Washington, Arizona, and Texas, and published photos of public protesters holding NESARA banners, but their affiliation with the movement is unclear. The News Tribune has traced photos of trucks driving around Washington, D.C. with "NESARA Announcement Now!" as part of a $40,000 advertising campaign allegedly paid for by an elderly San Francisco donor to Goodwin.

NESARA's concepts have also been incorporated by other conspiracy theories. In 2022, Bellingcat considered NESARA/GESARA as a "grandfather" of QAnon and reported that as QAnon declined in popularity, some of its adherents revived NESARA. The sovereign citizen movement has also supported NESARA-related theories.

=== Comparison to a cult and scam accusations ===
Critics consider NESARA to be a cult. Pointing to the fact that Goodwin, Lee, and Nidle frequently solicited donations from their readers, they accuse these leaders of being primarily interested in securing themselves an income. Goodwin, who also asked readers to donate their frequent flyer miles, claimed that she needed and had used the funds to travel around the world to secretly meet with high-level government officials about getting NESARA announced. In 2004, The News Tribune called Goodwin a "cybercult queen" and described NESARA as a scam.

A June 2006 complaint to the Washington consumer protection division accused Goodwin of using the NESARA story to defraud a 64-year-old San Francisco woman of at least $10,000. The woman's daughter said the actual amount is in the hundreds of thousands.

The prominence of failed prophecy also lends support to the cult theory. NESARA supporters often tell their readers that the NESARA announcement is imminent within days. According to the documentary Waiting For NESARA, the claim was also made prior to March 2003 that George Bush was planning the war with Iraq only to further delay the NESARA announcement. It was prophesied that spiritual beings and UFOs would intervene with Bush's plans and prevent the war.

== See also ==
- FairTax
- Redemption movement
- Swissindo
