= Glenn Unger =

American former child star

Glenn Richard Unger (born July 27, 1951), also known as Dr. Sam Kennedy, is an American former child star and convicted tax defrauder associated with the antigovernment Redemption movement.

As a child, Unger appeared as Winthrop Paroo in The Music Man on Broadway, and starred alongside his sister, Ronnie, in a Broadway tribute to Fred Astaire, for which he was complimented by Astaire for his performance. He later became an orthodontist.

According to The Christian Science Monitor, Unger became a key figure in the anti-tax Redemption movement using the name Sam Kennedy. He hosted a program titled Take No Prisoners on Republic Broadcasting Network in Round Rock, Texas. In a mass e-mail early in 2010, Unger vowed to use his show to present a “final remedy to the enslavement at the hands of corporations posing as legitimate government.” He pointed to a plan to “end economic warfare and political terror by March 31, 2010.” In two months, he said, “we can and WILL, BE FREE with your assistance.”

In 2013, Unger was tried in the United States District Court for the Northern District of New York, in Albany, New York, on one count of attempting to interfere with the administration of the U.S. internal revenue laws, four counts of filing false claims for over $36 million in tax refunds, one count of tax evasion, and one count of uttering a fictitious obligation. Unger was convicted of multiple counts of tax fraud, and on April 22, 2014, he was sentenced to 97 months in prison for those convictions.

Unger was released by the Federal Bureau of Prisons on December 13, 2019.

== See also ==
- Sovereign citizen movement
- Tax protester
