= Keraton Agung Sejagat =

Defunct micronation in indonesia

ꦏꦫꦠꦺꦴꦤ꧀ꦲꦒꦸꦁꦱꦗꦒꦢ꧀ (Javanese) Keraton Agung Sejagat (Indonesian)
- Micronation (unrecognized entity)
- Location: Purworejo Regency, Central Java, Indonesia
- Claimed by: Toto Santoso Hadiningrat, Dyah Gitarja
- Dates claimed: 2018–present

The Keraton Agung Sejagat (Javanese: ꦏꦫꦠꦺꦴꦤ꧀ꦲꦒꦸꦁꦱꦗꦒꦢ꧀, romanized: Karaton Agung Sajagad; English: Universal Grand Throne) was a hybrid mystical movement and fictional micronation based out of Purworejo Regency, Central Java, Indonesia.

Founded by Totok Santoso Hadiningrat (also known as R. Toto Santoso) and Dyah Gitarja (also known as Fanni Aminadia), the Keraton started operations in 2018 and eventually accumulated around 450 members. The Keraton attracted unfavourable public attention when they publicly performed the wilujengan ritual in a Purworejo township.

== Timeline ==
=== Origins ===
In 2016, Hadiningrat founded the Jogjakarta Development Committee (DEC), claiming to be an NGO working in the field of development. Hadiningrat claimed that anyone who signed up to be a member would get disbursements of around 100 to 200 dollars a month. These disbursements would be drawn on the committee's account with the Esa Monetary Fund, a fictional Swiss bank. The disbursements would never materialise. Four years later, Hadiningrat would re-surface with the Keraton.

=== Founding ===
Hadiningrat claimed he was granted the authority to found a successor state to the Majapahit Empire in 2018. He based this claim on the contention that when the Majapahit emperor Dyah Ranawijaya signed over sovereignty to the Portuguese in 1518, he did so on the condition that sovereignty be returned 500 years in the future.

=== Frivolous claims ===
Hadiningrat claimed the Pentagon and the United Nations as being under the authority of the Keraton. He also claimed dominion over every country on Earth. Hadiningrat painted a portrait in which the United Nations served as the legislature, the International Court of Justice the judiciary, and the Pentagon responsible for the defence of the Keraton.

=== Response and further developments ===
Hadiningrat collected around 200 dollars from prospective members in exchange for uniforms and titles.

On 12 January 2020, Keraton members held a wilujengan at Pogung Juru Tengah township in Purworejo Prefectire. The event reportedly caused local residents discomfort, and many of them lodged first information reports with the Indonesian National Police. The following day, law enforcement officers arrived to investigate the scene. Hadiningrat and Gitarja were taken into custody on 14 January in Kulon Progo Regency, Special Region of Yogyakarta. They were transferred to Semarang and designated suspects on the 15th.

On the 21st, Hadiningrat admitted in a press conference that the Keraton was a scam, and that its alleged historicity was entirely fabricated.

== Public response ==
Sultan Hamengkubuwono X, Governor of the Jogjakarta Special Administrative Region, reportedly laughed and denied knowing of the Keraton when interviewed.

Bondan Kanumoyoso, a historian at the University of Indonesia, rejected Hadiningrat's claims outright, saying that the Majapahit Empire collapsed in 1478. This would constitute a discrepancy with Hadiningrat's claim of a 1518 Majapahit-Portuguese treaty, on which the Keraton's legitimacy is predicated.

== See also ==
- Swissindo
- Sunda Empire
