= Freeman on the land movement =

Pseudolegal theory and associated movement

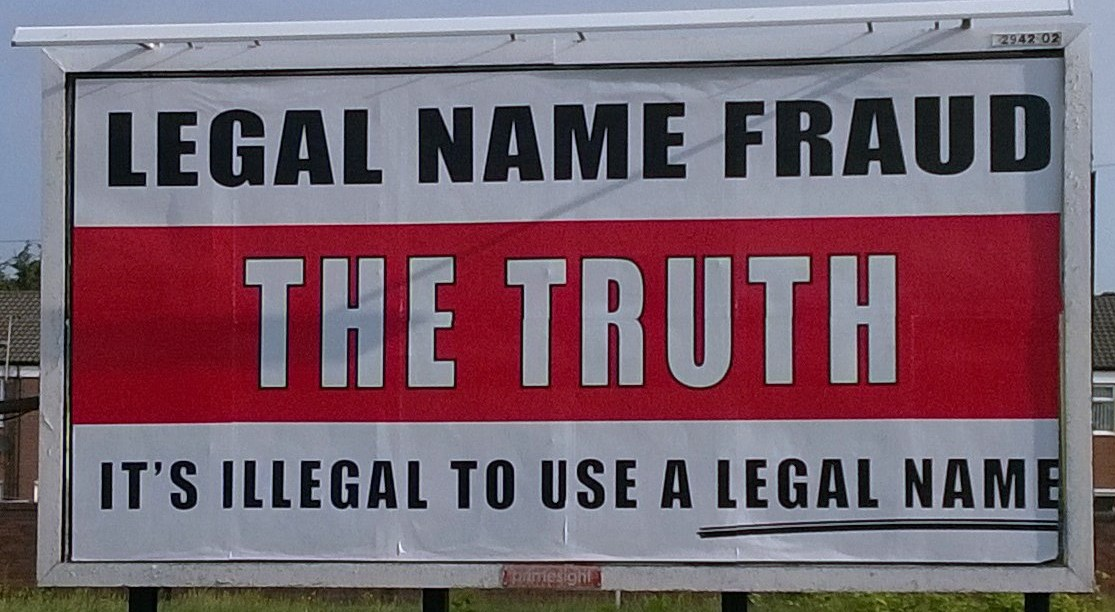
- "Legal name fraud" billboard in the United Kingdom, making arguments similar to those of the "Freeman on the land" movement
- Years active: 2000–present
- Country: Canada; Australia; New Zealand; United Kingdom; Ireland
- Influences: Sovereign citizens; Detaxers; pseudolaw; tax protesters; anti-statism; redemption movement

The freeman on the land movement (sometimes spelled freeman-on-the-land or abbreviated as FOTL), also known as the freemen of the land, the freemen movement, or simply freemen, is a loose group of individuals who adhere to pseudolegal concepts and conspiracy theories implying that they are bound by statute laws only if they consent to those laws. Freemen on the land are mostly present in Commonwealth countries. The movement appeared in Canada in the early 2000s, as an offshoot of the sovereign citizen movement which is more prevalent in the United States.

The name "freeman on the land" describes a person who is literally a "free man" on the land where they live. Movement members believe that they can declare themselves independent of the government and the rule of law, holding that the only true law is their own interpretation of "common law". Freemen on the land also advocate schemes to avoid taxes which they consider to be illegitimate. In Canada, courts and scholars use the technical phrase "Organised Pseudolegal Commercial Arguments" (OPCA) as an umbrella term for freemen on the land, the precursor "Detaxer" movement, sovereign citizens, their pseudolegal theories and the vexatious litigation based on them.

Freeman on the land arguments are legally baseless. Besides Canada, freemen on the land's pseudolegal claims have been argued in the courts of Australia, the United Kingdom, New Zealand and Ireland but have always been rejected. The movement's influence peaked in Canada during the late 2000s and early 2010s; it has since declined significantly.

== History ==
There is some cross-over between the two groups which call themselves freemen and sovereign citizens (and some others). The freeman on the land movement comes from the encounter of the Canadian and American traditions of pseudolaw theories. Canada developed its own tradition of pseudolaw and tax protesters, which merged over time with ideas from the American sovereign citizen movement.

The sovereign citizen movement originated in the radical anti-government movements in the US in the 1960s and 1970s, though the far right aspects of its ideology were gradually diluted over time. Sovereign citizen ideas garnered more support during the American farm crisis of the late 1970s and 1980s and a financial crisis in both the US and Canada in the same period.

With the advent of the Internet and continuing during the 21st century, people throughout the English-speaking world who share the core beliefs of these movements (which may be loosely defined as "see[ing] the state as a corporation with no authority over free citizens") have been able to connect and share their beliefs.

The pseudolegal ideas originated with the Sovereign Citizen movement in the United States were first imported into Canada through the "Detaxer" movement around the turn of the 21st century. "Detaxer" concepts were adapted by other "gurus" and eventually gave birth to the freeman on the land movement. By the late 2000s they had also started to spread to freeman groups in the UK and other Commonwealth countries, and to various groups in Europe.

=== Canada ===
==== Pre-Detaxer movement ====
Canada's tax protester and pseudolaw tradition was influenced by earlier idiosyncratic interpretations of Canadian law and constitution. In 1937, R. Rogers Smith self-published Alberta has the Sovereign Right to Issue and Use Its Own Credit, which argued that the British North America Act and the Statute of Westminster 1931 did not make Canada an independent nation, but left it a British dependency, and that the constitutional division of powers between the Canadian federal government and provincial governments was not defined. In 1945, Walter Frederick Kuhl MP delivered a speech in the House of Commons in which he argued, based on Smith's theories, that the Canadian constitution was defective and needed to be amended. Kuhl's argument formed a basis to refuse to pay income tax, for it alleged that the federal government had no taxation authority and that all other government jurisdictions remained with the provinces. The speech was reprinted and distributed as a booklet titled Canada, a Country Without a Constitution. Smith and Kuhl's texts were later used as references by the "Detaxer" movement.

According to Canadian legal scholar Donald J. Netolitzky, the "patient zero" for Canadian pseudolegal tax protester arguments was Gerrald Hart, an electronics shopkeeper from Winnipeg, who engaged during the 1950s in anti-tax efforts which included submitting tax returns that rejected liability instead of correctly reporting his shop's tax liabilities. In The Queen v. Hart Electronics Limited, Hart was charged with failure to file a tax return. The Manitoba Court of Appeal acquitted Hart, ruling that his unsigned, unusual tax return was still a tax return, and refused to consider whether the tax return was adequate. Hart also claimed that the Supreme Court ruling in Nova Scotia (Attorney General) v. Canada (Attorney General) (1951) SCR 31 meant that income tax acts passed by the Canadian government since 1971 were unconstitutional. He published the Hart System of Effective Tax Avoidance that described his strategies to avoid taxes.

In the early 1990s, Murray Gauvreau worked with social credit group Pilgrims of Saint Michael to promote tax protester strategies based on Hart's System of Effective Tax Avoidance via the organisation's Michael journal. Gauvreau's arguments, based on filing defective tax returns, as well as constitutional arguments based on the division of powers, were rejected by the Court of Queen's Bench of Alberta.

In the 1980s and the 1990s, fiscal misconception conspiracy theories similar to those found in American tax protester movements were also adopted by Canadian tax protester groups. In 1999, arguments based on the constitutional division of powers, earlier used by Hart and Gauvreau, were further developed by Robert A. Marquis in his book Fraud, Deception, Manipulation, though Marquis failed to mention that these arguments had already been rejected by Canadian courts.

Canadian pseudolegal anti-tax activism initially had little resonance outside marginal right-wing communities. This changed in the late 1990s, when the "Detaxer" movement became influential in Canada.

==== Detaxer movement (1998) ====
Around 1998, Canadian pilot Eldon Gerald Warman, who had been exposed to American pseudolegal concepts while residing in the United States, promoted ideas adapted from the sovereign citizen movement through his website Detax Canada and the organization of seminars. Warman claimed to be subject only to "common law", referring not to modern case law, but to historical English case law. He credited as his mentor American activist Roger Elvick, who had founded the redemption movement in the United States; the redemption movement notably promoted the strawman theory, which is based on the assertion that state legislative authority only extends to an individual's legal person and not to their natural person.

Warman claimed that whereas in the United States, an individual's Social Security Number was used to attach this "strawman" to a natural person, in Canada, this was done using a birth certificate. Around 2000, Warman also worked with Ernst Friedrich Kyburz and Sikander Abdulali "Alex" Muljiani to promote anti-tax ideas based on the sovereign citizen movement's beliefs, at joint seminars across Canada. He also used misinterpretations of Canadian case law to justify unrestricted automobile use.

Warman asserted that government authority over an individual arises from a contract, that statute law cannot be used to impose on a person a contract that deprives the individual of property rights and freedom to travel, and that individual rights and liberties derived from Anglo-Saxon common law, as well as Magna Carta. He instructed his followers to use disclaimers in income tax returns, to reject correspondence from the Canada Revenue Agency and to refrain from citing the Constitution of Canada in court, to avoid entering into an assumpsit contract.

He asked them instead to deny the "strawman", claim "common law" jurisdiction, and otherwise claim the right to silence. Warman also used pre-Detaxer arguments to assert that the Canadian constitution was defective, and proposed a new constitutional document, the Magna Carta Kanata. However, he criticised other pre-Detaxer strategies and suggested that they were secretly sponsored by the Canada Revenue Agency itself.

In 1999, after he was charged with assaulting a police officer, Warman attempted to use these pseudo-legal arguments to assert that the Provincial Court of British Columbia did not have jurisdiction over him in R v Warman (2000) BCPC 0022. On denying Warman's appeal, the British Columbia Court of Appeal noted that his arguments were based on a rejection of state and judicial authority.

Warman, who died in 2017, was emulated by several other "gurus". Some Detaxer methods relied, with occasional success, on technical loopholes, while others attacked the taxation authority itself. One "guru" who enjoyed particular notoriety was Russell Porisky, who operated an organization known as the Paradigm Education Group. Porisky promoted Detaxer theories via multilevel marketing strategies, making them more broadly accessible to the public. Porisky's concept was that people could avoid paying taxes by declaring themselves a "natural person" rather than taxpayers. His method relied on combining the definition of a "person" in section 248(1) of the Canadian income tax Act with the strawman theory. Porisky was first convicted of tax evasion in 2012. In 2016, he was sentenced to five and a half years in prison and ordered to pay C$259,482 in fines for tax evasion and for having counselled others to commit fraud.

The Detaxer movement went through a decline after 2008, due to the repeated failure of its concepts in courts. As of 2016, the last "guru" actively teaching Detaxer theories is David Kevin Lindsay, a serial litigant who participated in hundreds of court cases as a plaintiff or as an "agent" acting on behalf of others. In 2010, Lindsay unsuccessfully argued before the Supreme Court of British Columbia that he should not be paying taxes because he was not a "person" as defined by the Income Tax Act but "a full liability free will flesh and blood living man". Linsday's own failure in court eroded his status as a pseudolaw guru. In 2016, Lindsay complained that Canadian pseudolaw affiliates and gurus had become too influenced by US concepts. During the COVID-19 pandemic, Lindsay re-emerged as a leader of anti-mask and anti-lockdown protests in British Columbia.

==== Origin of freeman on the land movement (from 2000) ====
The freeman on the land movement in Canada originated with one single key "guru", Robert Arthur Menard. A former construction worker and stand-up comic, Menard entered pseudolaw as a student of Detaxer theories, which he later promoted on the Internet through online forums such as "Cannabis culture", videos and freely distributed ebooks. He became more invested in pseudolaw around 2000 in relation to his dispute with child welfare authorities over access to and custody of the child of a teenaged partner.

Menard's guru activity initially focused on how birth documentation allegedly allows the state to control children. He later expanded his claims, asserting that he could immunize people from Canadian law in general. He coined the name "freeman on the land" around 2005. Critics have, in response, used the phrase "Freeloader-on-the-Land" to describe how these "freemen" ignored their social and legal obligations while still benefiting from Canadian services and infrastructures.

Menard showed little conceptual innovation, and mostly used simplified versions of Detaxer theories which he presented as fact. However, his skillful use of social media helped him gain more followers than Warman. He also borrowed concepts from Mary Elizabeth Croft, another pseudolaw ideologue. Menard's only personal contribution to pseudolegal theory is his argument that the secret "strawman" bank account is reflected in the Charter, section 7 reference to the "security of the person" which, he claims, refers to the "birth bond" of the strawman. Otherwise, his theories showed little documentary foundation. In his 2011 book With Lawful Excuse, Menard claims that Canada was salvaged as a corporation operated by bankers in London after the death of Queen Victoria; in the same book, he later claims that Canada is a "US corporation", that Canadian provincial governments are a "legal fiction", and finally references Pre-Detaxer theories that Canada's constitution is defective. Donald J. Netolitzky stated that despite Menard's stature in pseudolegal circles, his understanding of law is "best described as unsophisticated", and "grossly inferior" to that of Detaxer gurus such as David Kevin Lindsay.

The notable difference between the Detaxer and freemen on the land populations is that the latter shows a politically leftist orientation, open to environmentalism, anti-globalization concepts and marijuana advocacy. Freeman on the land ideology developed in Canada mostly as a criminal culture: most of its courtroom applications were aimed to legitimise illegal activities. Variations by other gurus may also include New Age concepts. Besides claiming that governments and statute laws are illegitimate and refusing to pay income tax, movement members reject the use of official documents such as health cards and driver's licences.

==== Developments ====
The movement attracted a broad range of people opposed to the federal government of Canada, including environmentalists and First Nations people. Like their Canadian "Detaxer" predecessors and American sovereign citizens, Canadian freemen on the land put a strain on public resources, notably using paper terrorism by filing numerous documents written in incoherent language, clogging the court system. In 2008, Menard was prohibited from appearing in court as a counsel and giving legal advice in British Columbia.

In 2012, the Canadian Security Intelligence Service reported that freemen on the land were causing a "major policing problem". Adherents had violent encounters with police forces and the movement attempted to create its own "corps of peace officers". In 2013, Canadian media reported the case of a Calgary woman whose tenant, a freeman on the land, had claimed her property as his own and declared it an "embassy". In 2015, a police officer was murdered in Edmonton by a man who adhered to freeman on the land ideology.

Menard also launched a financial scheme, the Association of Canadian Consumer Purchasers (ACCP), through which people could purportedly receive the "Menard Card", a $2,500.00 debit card, in return for a $250.00 per month subscription.

Around 2010, Menard's leadership was challenged by another "guru", Dean Clifford, who advocated a more confrontational approach against government and court authorities. Unlike Menard who had begun his activities in far-left circles, Clifford had a white supremacist and skinhead background: his earlier adherents came largely from these environments. In February 2013, Clifford was jailed for minor offenses. His status escalated dramatically when he was released one month later, and claimed to have successfully used freeman on the land methods to get out of prison. He was arrested again in November of the same year. In 2015, he was sentenced to three years in prison for numerous drug and weapons offenses. After his release, he endeavored to restore his status in the pseudolaw community and operated for a time a company which purported to discharge customers' debts through an "A4V" scheme. In 2018, due to his use of that scheme, Clifford was declared a vexatious litigant in Alberta and made subject to strict court access restrictions.

Another freeman on the land guru, a Quebec resident calling himself "John Spirit", began in 2012 to market his pseudolegal services on the Internet. He stood out by using actual Canadian legal resources to develop pseudolegal concepts more sophisticated than Menard's, as well as a new definition of the strawman theory based on misinterpretations of international texts. Spirit notably asserted that international treaties are supraconstitutional authorities in Canada, as they are incorporated into the Charter. He specifically argued that one could enforce international treaties via Section 7 of the Charter to eliminate one's "strawman" and become free of legal constraints. According to Donald J. Netolitzky, whereas Menard and Clifford's theories are little more than "empty mantras", Spirit's arguments are grounded on specific court decision passages often cited in Supreme Court jurisprudence and may have triggered a shift towards "more conventionally argued" freeman on the land litigation. However, Spirit's attempt to develop a serious freeman on the land legal thinking proved a "two-edged sword" when his concepts were refuted in Canadian provincial and Federal courts.

==== Decline ====
Since the early 2010s, the freeman on the land movement has declined in Canada due to the persistent failure of its concepts in court. Many freemen on the land suffered serious legal, financial, or family consequences for putting the movement's ideas into practice. The Court of Queen's Bench of Alberta's 2012 Meads v. Meads decision, which refuted in detail freeman on the land theories and other pseudolegal concepts, has since been used as case law against pseudolegal tactics by courts in Canada as well as in other Commonwealth countries. The Quatloos.com online community was also instrumental in discrediting freeman on the land ideology, by publishing court documents which showed that Menard and Clifford were ineffectual when involved in court cases (including their own) and by exposing that Menard himself did not practice his own doctrines, as he used a driver's license while claiming they were unnecessary.

The decline of Menard as a guru was also caused by the lack of success of his other initiatives such as the creation of the "peace officers" corps, of an alternative community and government structure, and a touring arts and crafts event. His reputation in the freeman on the land community was especially damaged by the failure of his AACP scheme, when the substantial numbers of Canadian freemen who had paid to subscribe to it never received their "Menard Cards" and other promised benefits. Eventually, Menard largely withdrew from the scene while newer "gurus" met with little success.

Clifford was mostly discredited following his second 2013 arrest, and after his freeman on the land tactics proved unable to prevent his conviction. He eventually disavowed his original pseudolegal theories, went on to promote equity as superior to common law, and appeared to revert back to his earlier right-wing and racist associations.

While the COVID-19 pandemic has caused a new surge in pseudolegal activities in Canada, it has not benefited the local freeman of the land movement, which remained moribund as of 2022. In the meantime, the more US-specific sovereign citizen movement has gained traction in Canada. However, incidents involving self-described freemen of the land are still reported in Canada.

=== United Kingdom ===
Freeman on the land ideology reached the United Kingdom in the late 2000s. Use of pseudolaw in the UK is difficult to evaluate, but there is clear evidence of an active community using concepts mostly derived from Canadian freeman on the land sources. Unlike Canadian freemen who primarily use pseudolaw to justify illegal activity, UK litigants mostly focus on economic issues, such as avoiding Council Tax, motor vehicle registration and insurance, television licence fees, mortgages, and other debts.

British freeman on the land outlets have included the "Get Out Of Debt Free" website that purported to eliminate debts through "A4V" schemes and promissory notes processes, and "WeReBank", a "financial" entity that offered subscribers blank cheques to pay off large sums. In addition to the economic aspects of their ideology, British freemen gradually developed an anti-government political perspective that is more comparable to the American sovereign citizens than to their Canadian freemen on the land counterparts.

In 2016, billboards in the UK advertised the freeman on the land concept of "legal name fraud", a variation of the strawman theory claiming that "all legal names are owned by the Crown, and therefore using a legal name without their written permission is fraud".

=== Ireland ===
In Ireland, where freeman on the land tactics were imported roughly at the same time as in the United Kingdom, local gurus have created Ireland-specific motifs of defective state authority, citing the Constitution of Ireland and presenting Brehon law, rather than English common law, as the true source of legislation.

The expansion of pseudolegal "freeman" activity in Ireland was fostered by a period of economic difficulties in the late 2000s, following the burst of a real-estate bubble which led people to seek remedies for their financial woes. Multiple entities offered their customers relief from debts and mortgages through the use of fraudulent, pseudolegal schemes. One such entity is the Rodolphus Allen Family Private Trust, which promised immunity to foreclosure to its subscribers and advocated "strawman" concepts.

=== Australia ===
Australia has its own tradition of pseudolaw, dating back to the 1980s and sovereign citizen concepts were imported into Australia during the 1990s. Local gurus have been using Australia-specific concepts; however, Australian pseudolaw litigants may also identify as freemen on the land or use Canadian-style freeman documents.

There have been several court cases testing the core concept, none successful for the "freemen". Local freeman on the land activists have made particular efforts to appeal to Indigenous Australians.

=== New Zealand ===
Unlike Australia, New Zealand has not developed local concepts, even though many New Zealander pseudolaw litigants are Maori who base their claims on their ethnic status. Pseudolegal documents in New Zealand have shown influence from multiple foreign sources, including Canadian freemen on the land ideology.

== Groupings ==
A number of anti-state movements with similar tactics but different ideologies may receive the label "freeman on the land".

=== Canada ===
Robert Arthur Menard, the originator of the movement, was called the "Director of Freemen on the Land", though he likened the movement to "a voluntary relay race" and said that it was "way too unorganized to have a hierarchical structure". Canadian legal scholar Donald J. Netolitzky commented that the "freeman" population had an "amorphous" character and was "less an organization or 'movement' than a collection of individuals who hold powerful anti-authority beliefs".

An article published by The Journal of Intelligence, Conflict, and Warfare identified nine classes of adherents of freeman on the land and similar anti-authority groups in Canada:

1. fantastical believers, who operate in an alternative frame of reference that may be difficult to distinguish from mental illness;
2. conspiracy theorists, whose paranoid worldview is rich in blame to outside entities;
3. escapists, who want autonomy and tend to be loners;
4. dabblers/opportunists, who see the movement as a chance to get out from under sudden setbacks including family or financial problems;
5. sympathisers, who share the ideologies and anti-government views, but continue to fulfil their obligations and do not engage in confrontational or pseudolegal tactics;
6. the committed, with active, ongoing anti-authority conflict, which may or may not have started with a sudden event like the dabblers/opportunists;
7. violent extremists, who are rare, but move past pseudolegal tactics;
8. entrepreneurs, who exploit other adherents by means such as "money for nothing" schemes or providing pseudolegal services or documents for a fee; and
9. "gurus", either with an established following or developing one, who seek visibility in the movement with their take on world events and pseudolaw theories.

Associate Justice John D. Rooke, in his 2012 Meads v. Meads decision, describes the freeman on the land movement as having "libertarian and right wing overtones". In a 2019 article of the Alberta Law Review, Donald J. Netolitzky disagrees with this assessment, which he considers a confusion between the freeman on the land and sovereign citizen movements: according to Netolitzky, a sociological study has shown that, while very hostile to state and institutional actors, the freeman on the land population is predominately left leaning. He adds, however, that freemen on the land are ideologically heterogeneous and that there is a "broad overlap" between their beliefs and those of the sovereign citizens, which leads to confusion between the two.

=== Australia ===
In Australia, there is some cross-over between groups which call themselves freemen on the land and sovereign citizens (and some others). From the 2010s, there has been a growing number of Freemen targeting Indigenous Australians, with groups with names like Tribal Sovereign Parliament of Gondwana Land, the Original Sovereign Tribal Federation (OSTF) and the Original Sovereign Confederation. OSTF Founder Mark McMurtrie, an Aboriginal Australian man, has produced YouTube videos speaking about "common law", which incorporate Freemen beliefs. Appealing to other Aboriginal people by partly identifying with the land rights movement, McMurtrie played on their feelings of alienation and lack of trust in the systems which had not served Indigenous people well. A group called United Rights Australia (U R Australia) has a Facebook presence, and there are other websites promulgating Freemen/Sovereign Citizen ideas.

=== United Kingdom ===
In the United Kingdom, freeman on the land ideology has influenced The People's United Community (TPUC), a group created in 2007 to oppose taxation, European integration and the Conservative government. TPUC espoused one UK-specific concept of defective state authority, called "lawful rebellion", namely that a freeman could write to the Queen and invoke Clause 61 of the Magna Carta to negate Royal (and, by extension, government) authority. However, Clause 61 empowers 25 Barons to restrict the monarch, and does not concern the general public nor mention "lawful rebellion".

During the early 2010s, freeman ideas also spilled into the UK Occupy movement. In 2018, The White Pendragons, a group of freemen on the land whose ideology combined pseudolaw with anti-government, anti-immigration and anti-Islam views, tried to "arrest" London Mayor Sadiq Khan.

=== Ireland ===
In Ireland, the Tir na Saor website, which operated from 2009 to 2016, was a major hub for the Irish pseudolaw community and showed clear Canadian freeman influences. The most unusual development of freeman ideology in Ireland was the creation of a political party, Direct Democracy Ireland, co-founded in 2010 by anti-foreclosure activist and serial litigant Ben Gilroy. Direct Democracy Ireland did poorly at elections and the Irish freeman on the land movement eventually went into decline. In 2024, Direct Democracy Ireland was rebranded as Liberty Republic and ran six candidates in the 2024 Irish general election. None of the candidates were elected.

== Beliefs ==
Freemen on the land, like sovereign citizens, share the core beliefs commonly seen in pseudolaw. Their theories have been broadly defined as "see[ing] the state as a corporation with no authority over free citizens". Freemen's beliefs are largely based on misunderstandings and wishful thinking, and do not stand up to legal scrutiny. Donald J. Netolitzky has commented that, unlike sovereign citizens and Detaxers who build their theories upon historical and documentary references, the freeman on the land movement tends to "simply make things up". Freemen arguments have been rejected in the courts of various countries, including England, Wales, Canada, and Australia.

The Canadian case Meads v. Meads (see below) identified five major themes in the freeman on the land belief systems:

=== Claimed exemption from jurisdiction ===
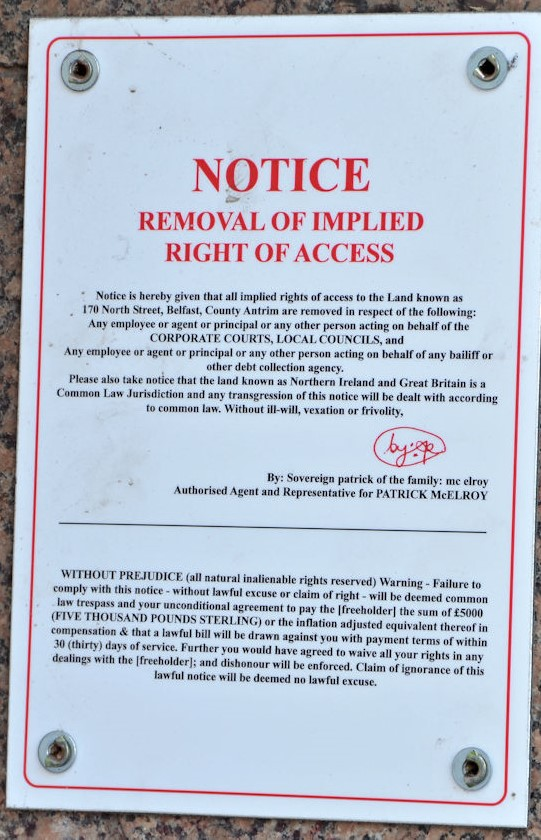
An example of a notice used by a self-described freeman on the land in Belfast, Northern Ireland

A number of arguments are employed to claim immunity from law. These arguments are described in Meads v. Meads as "magic hats", as a reference to the fact that many pseudolegal tactics resemble magic rituals more than actual law.

Many freemen beliefs are based on idiosyncratic interpretations of admiralty or maritime law, which the freemen claim govern the commercial world. These beliefs stem from fringe interpretations of various nautical-sounding terms, such as ownership, citizenship, dock, or birth (berth) certificate. Freemen refer to the court as a ship and the court's occupants as passengers, and may claim that those leaving are "men overboard".

Freemen will try to claim common law (as opposed to admiralty law) jurisdiction by asking "Do you have a claim against me?" This, they contend, removes their consent to be governed by admiralty law and turns the court into a common law court, so that proceedings would have to go forward according to their version of common law. This procedure has never been successfully used.

Freemen will often not accept legal representation, believing that to do so would mean contracting with the state. They believe that the United Kingdom and Canada are now operating in bankruptcy and are therefore under admiralty law. They believe that since the abolition of the gold standard, currencies are backed not by gold but by the people (or the "legal fiction of their persons").

British freemen describe people as creditors of the UK corporation. Therefore, they claim, a court is a place of business, and a summons is an invitation to discuss the matter at hand, with no powers to require attendance or compliance. They may believe that the government controls secret bank accounts in their name as part of this theory, which may be accessed to pay off debts.

One document commonly used by the freeman on the land movement to claim immunity from jurisdiction is the so-called "Notice of Understanding, Intent, and Claim of Right" (also abbreviated as "NOUICR"), a type of pseudolegal document to be delivered to government actors, which purportedly allows its users to "opt out" of state obligations while maintaining or creating the rights they desire. Menard created the original NOUICR template, which was later adapted and revised by many other freemen "gurus" to expand the rights claimed in the document or to make it appear more authoritative. Freemen on the land believe that such documents will make them immune from prosecution or from state sanction. The signed document, often notarised, is sent to the King and possibly other authorities such as the Prime Minister and police chiefs. It usually begins with the words "Whereas it is my understanding" and goes on to state the freemen's understanding of the law and their lack of consent to it.

=== Laws as contracts ===
Freemen believe that statute law is a contract, and that individuals can therefore opt out of statute law, choosing instead to live under what they call "common" (case) and "natural" laws. They believe natural laws require only that individuals do not harm others, do not damage the property of others, and do not use "fraud or mischief" in contracts. In a 2004 video titled "Bursting Bubbles of Government Deception", Menard claimed that one does not have to follow the law if he has "constructively den[ied] consent to be governed" via contract with the government. Freemen believe that since they exist in a common law jurisdiction where equality is paramount and mandatory, the people in the government and courts are not above the law, and that government and court personnel therefore must obtain the consent of the governed.

Freemen believe that government employees who do not obtain consent of the governed have abandoned the rule of law. They believe this consent is routinely secured by way of people submitting applications and through acts of registration. They believe the public servants have deceived the population into abandoning their status as freemen in exchange for the status of a "child of the province" or "ward of the state", allowing those children to collect benefits such as welfare, unemployment insurance, and pension plans or old age security.

Freemen believe that the government has to establish "joinder" to link oneself and one's legal person. If one is asked whether one is "John Smith" and one says that is so, one has established joinder and connected the physical and human persons. The next step is to obtain consent, as they believe that statutes are merely invitations to enter a contract, and are only legally enforceable if one enters into the contract consensually. Otherwise, they believe that statute laws are not applicable. Freemen believe that the government is constantly trying to trick people into entering into a contract with them, so they often return bills, notices, summons and so on with the message "No contract—return to sender".

=== Silence as consent ===
One common pseudolegal belief shared by Freemen of the land is that "silence means consent", meaning that any claim or alleged statement of fact placed in a sworn document is proven true unless rebutted. This belief extends to Freemen's use of the "Notices of Understanding, Intent, and Claim of Right" which they consider stand as fact if any government actor can be persuaded to file them and does not rebut them afterwards.

=== Dual identity ===
A common pseudolegal belief, originating in the redemption and sovereign citizen movements, is that people have two parts to their existence: their "flesh and blood" identity as individuals and their legal "person". The former is joined to the latter by the birth certificate; some freemen claim that it is entirely limited to the birth certificate. Under this theory, a "strawman" is created when a birth certificate is issued, and this strawman is the entity who is subject to statutory law. The physical self is referred to by a slightly different name, such as "John of the family Smith" instead of "John Smith". "Notices of Understanding, Intent, and Claim of Right" documents may or may not refer to the "strawman".

=== Secret financial instruments ===
An implication of the strawman theory, also derived from the concepts of the redemption movement, is that there is some government-controlled account linked to a person through the birth certificate. This aspect of the theory suggests that the value of that account can be applied to financial obligations and even criminal charges. The concept behind this scheme has sometimes been called "money for nothing".

== Court cases ==
=== Canada ===
- In 2012, Dennis Larry Meads of Edmonton, Alberta, used freeman on the land arguments during his divorce and matrimonial property case, notably demanding that his spousal and child support obligations be paid by using the money from his "strawman"'s purported secret bank account. In his court decision Meads v. Meads, Alberta Court of Queen's Bench Associate Chief Justice John D. Rooke coined the phrase "Organised Pseudolegal Commercial Arguments" to describe the techniques and arguments used by freemen in court, describing them as frivolous and vexatious:
  The bluntly idiotic substance of Mr. Mead's [sic] argument explains the unnecessarily complicated manner in which it was presented. OPCA arguments are never sold to their customers as simple ideas, but instead are byzantine schemes which more closely resemble the plot of a dark fantasy novel than anything else. Latin maxims and powerful sounding language are often used. Documents are often ornamented with many strange markings and seals. Litigants engage in peculiar, ritual‑like in court conduct. All these features appear necessary for gurus to market OPCA schemes to their often desperate, ill‑informed, mentally disturbed, or legally abusive customers. This is crucial to understand the non-substance of any OPCA concept or strategy. The story and process of a OPCA scheme is not intended to impress or convince the Courts, but rather to impress the guru's customer.[emphasis in original]
  In refuting each of the arguments used by Meads, Rooke concluded that "a decade of reported cases, many of which he refers to in his ruling, have failed to prove a single concept advanced by OPCA litigants".
  Dennis Larry Meads eventually abandoned pseudolegal strategies and retained counsel for a time. Even though the divorce was only finalized in 2017, he continued the rest of the litigation in an orderly fashion.
- In 2012, Wilfred Keith Thompson and two others were arrested by police in Guelph, Ontario, Canada, charged with breaking, entering and theft as well as firearms offences. Thompson had previously made headlines for informing City Hall, local police, Guelph MP Frank Valeriote, Prime Minister Stephen Harper and other officials he is "an autonomous being not controlled by others". One of his co-defendants, Trevor "Red" De Block, refused to identify himself to the court, though it was said that his criminal mug shot, computer records, tattoos and other information confirmed his identity. "I object," De Block said, adding that he was not the "rightful owner" of his name, but refusing to clarify or participate in legal proceedings. "I don't bow down to bail ... to false gods," he said, and rejected assistance from the appointed lawyer. Thompson and De Block were denied bail.

=== England and Wales ===
As of 2011 there was no recorded instance of freeman tactics being upheld in a court of law in the UK.

- Elizabeth Watson came to public attention in 2011 as a self-styled legal adviser for Victoria Haigh in a child custody case; she was given a nine-month prison sentence for contempt of court (later suspended). She had defaced court documents by writing the words "no contract" and otherwise refused to accept or acknowledge the authority of a court of law, by among other things refusing to respond to the written legal notices or other correspondences from the court, and styling and addressing herself and Haigh in irregular fashion as "Elizabeth of the Watson family" and "Victoria of the Haigh family" respectively, instead of their names in the normal and usual mode of rendering.
- Mark Bond of Norfolk, England, was arrested in 2010 for non-payment of tax, despite handing police a "notice of intent" stating that he was no longer a UK citizen. He told police that the notice had already been delivered to the Queen and the prime minister. He told the Norwich Evening News, "Today I asked the judge to walk into the court under common law and not commercial law. If I had entered under commercial law it would prove that I accepted its law. I was denied my rights to go in there." He was sentenced to three months custody, suspended on condition that he pay off the debt at £20 a week.
- Dean Marshall of Preston, Holderness, near Hull, East Yorkshire, England, was taken to court after he was found to be growing 26 cannabis plants in his garden shed. Claiming he was a freeman on the land and therefore not guilty, he then attempted to call up Queen Elizabeth II and Prime Minister David Cameron as his witnesses, although he was told that neither was available to attend. A jury at Kingston upon Hull Crown Court dismissed his claims and convicted him of conspiracy to produce cannabis for which he was given a 12-month prison sentence, suspended for two years, and was ordered to carry out 150 hours of unpaid work.
- Doug Jones of Pembroke Dock, Pembrokeshire, Wales, spent 22 days in prison after refusing to take a breath test. Jones questioned the authority and jurisdiction of the court, asking to see the judge's 'Oath of Office' which resulted in a sentence of fourteen days for contempt of court. He was sentenced to a further seven days after failing to attend a second hearing, but pleaded guilty to the original charges, receiving an endorsement on his driving licence. His interest in the freemen on the land movement started after watching documentaries on conspiracy theories surrounding the September 11 attacks and London bombings. His solicitor, Phillipa Ashworth, stated "On this occasion, in hindsight he appreciates it was not the time to test out philosophical theories behind this approach to life, and in hindsight it isn't something he would do again."
- Gavin Kaylhem of Grimsby, North East Lincolnshire, England, wilfully refused to pay his council tax debts of £1,268.54 accrued between 2001 and 2008 and was sentenced to 30 days' imprisonment. He had claimed that he was a "freeman" and thus had no contractual duty under common law to pay. He refused to co-operate with magistrates' questions.
- Mandeep Sandhu of Tividale, Sandwell, West Midlands, was stopped by police while driving a car that was insured to a woman. He refused to give his details to the officers, saying that to do so would mean "entering into a contract he could not afford to fulfil". He refused to co-operate at the police station and when brought before Sandwell Magistrates' Court, in October 2015, Sandhu was convicted of driving without insurance and obstructing police and was also found in contempt of court. He was sentenced to 14 days in prison for the contempt, and ordered to pay £330 in fines for the insurance charge with court costs and had 6 points added to his licence. A spokesperson for West Midlands Police said:
  The whole process meant that a simple matter of driving without insurance took up hours of police time – and ultimately a stint behind bars after being convicted of contempt of court while defending himself. We hope this case acts as a warning that to obstruct the police and the courts is not a wise move.
- Errol Denton, a live blood analysis practitioner, was charged with offences under the Cancer Act 1939. At Westminster Magistrates' Court, he used a freeman defence. Since both the prosecution and the defence were rare, it was reported in the press. On 20 March 2014 he was convicted on all nine counts and fined £9,000 plus around £10,000 in costs.
- In June 2019, a man who refused to register his son's birth under the Births and Deaths Registration Act 1953 lost an appeal to the London High Court after using a freeman defence. He cited an obscure law, the Cestui Que Vie Act 1666, and argued that registering the birth would be equivalent to "an entry into a ship's manifest", in which the child becomes "an asset to the country which has boarded a vessel to sail on the high seas", thus causing him to become controlled by the state. The judge ruled that the local council had the right to step in as the child's "institutional parent" to register the birth.
- Cases have also been reported in Gloucestershire, Somerset, and Cornwall.

=== Ireland ===
- Bobby Sludds appeared in court in County Wexford in Ireland, charged with various motoring offences including two counts of no insurance. Before the police began to give evidence, the accused handed in a letter stating he was not Mr. Sludds but Bobby of the family Sludds and questioning the use of the word 'person' in the charge. He was given two suspended sentences and a fine of €670. (He had 24 previous convictions for motoring offences.) A similar case occurred in County Wexford in 2013, with a bankrupt businessman imprisoned for contempt of court being returned to jail for refusing to recognise the authority of the court, and in 2022, in which a mortgage defaulter questioned the legitimacy of the court, a case which his financial provider won.
- Ben Gilroy took numerous court cases in the 2010s against several Irish banks and has represented people facing house repossessions. In 2018, he was banned by the High Court from taking further court cases against Allied Irish Banks and from advising others before the courts due to his history of bringing forward frivolous and vexatious litigation. He has been jailed on three occasions for contempt of court.

=== Australia ===
The following court cases have been based on the freeman argument:

- Essenberg v The Queen B54/1999 (High Court of Australia, 22 June 2000)
- Australian Competition & Consumer Commission v Rana (Federal Court of Australia, March–April 2008)
- R v Stoneman (Supreme Court of Queensland, 30 July 2013)
- Van den Hoorn v Ellis (District Court of Queensland, 30 November 2010)
- Glew v White (Supreme Court of Western Australia, 10 July 2012)
- Elliott v Commissioner of Police (District Court of Queensland, 25 July 2014)
- Bradley v The Crown (Supreme Court of Queensland, 13 November 2020): In 2019, Ross James Bradley appeared in the Brisbane Magistrates Court, in Queensland, Australia, after he was stopped by police and found to be driving without a licence. He was fined A$150 after he argued that police had no power to charge him or commence proceedings before the court. Bradley appealed to the Queensland District Court (QDC), arguing that he was a "sovereign citizen" and the laws of Queensland did not apply to him. Bradley sought leave to appeal the order made by the QDC to dismiss his appeal of the Magistrates Court decision to the Queensland Court of Appeal (QCA). At the QCA, President Sofronoff noted that, given his sovereign citizen arguments it was difficult to understand why Bradley was "agitating his claims before this court, one which was established under the laws he says do not apply to him". The judge noted that the "paradox was apparently lost" on the applicant and dismissed the appeal.

== Professional advisories ==
Lawyers and notaries in British Columbia and Alberta, Canada, have been warned by their professional bodies about dealing with freemen as clients. In particular, lawyers have been advised to be careful not to stamp or notarise the pseudo-legal documents that freemen typically use, so as not to create a perception of authority for such documents.

== See also ==
- Abuse of process
- Anomie
- Antinomianism
- Anti-statism
- Christian Identity
- Consent of the governed
- Freedomites
- Guardians of the Free Republics
- Individualist anarchism
- Reichsbürger movement
- Rodolphus Allen Family Private Trust
- Self-ownership
- Social contract
- Tax resistance
- Union of Slavic Forces of Russia
