= Lawful rebellion =

A lawful rebellion was the term for a possibility in England under Article 61 of Magna Carta, where citizens could engage in a rebellion against counsellors and barons should they have made a transgression that was not corrected with in forty days. Citizens who potentially engaged in such rebellion could legally seize lands based on what they saw would be fair restitution and would not be able to be prosecuted despite potentially seizing lands from the government.

Article 61, and thus the potential for a lawful rebellion, was removed from effective English law some time in the 13th century.
