= Sunda Empire =

Micronation founded in Indonesia

- Micronation (unrecognized entity)
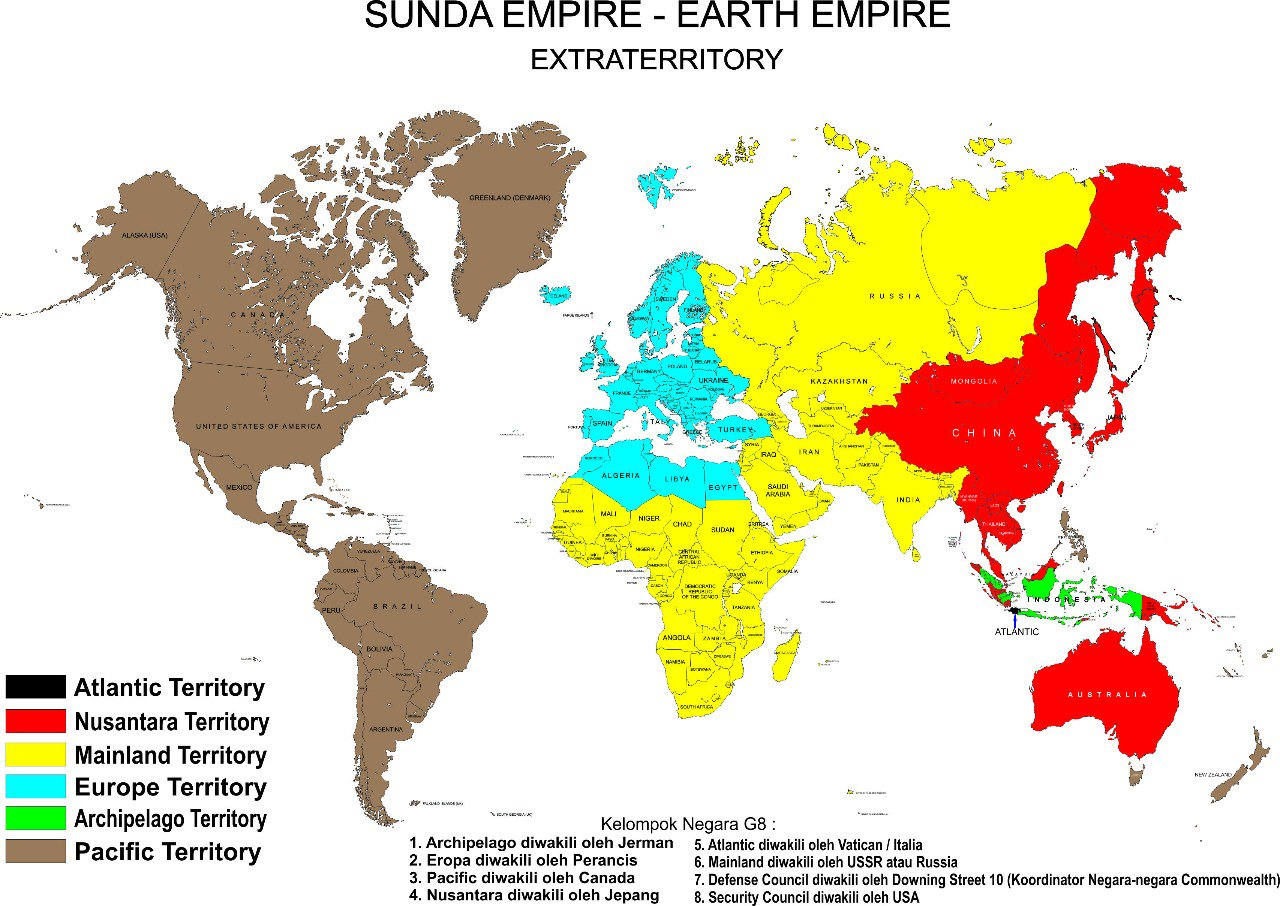
- Area claimed: Most of the world (based in Bandung, Indonesia)
- Claimed by: Nasri Banks, Ratu Agung Ratnaningru, Rangga Sasana dan Alexander Simamora
- Dates claimed: Established 2007 (immigration incident); 2017 (declaration)

The Sunda Democratic Empire, also known as the Sunda Empire–Earth Empire or simply Sunda Empire, was a fictional micronation based in Bandung, Indonesia. Self-proclaimed to be the successor of the Macedonian Empire and to have dominion over many or all countries in the world, the organization was publicly declared and became a media sensation in Indonesia in 2020. The micronation had been conceptualized since around 2003 and was first reported in the media in 2007. Shortly after the public declaration, the leading figures of the Sunda Empire were arrested for fraud.

== History ==
Around 2003, Nasri Banks learned about the Sunda Empire from unspecified sources. His wife, Raden Ratna Ningrum, then claimed that the empire was the successor to Alexander the Great's empire. That year, Nasri was approached by a man named Jhonson Low, who presented to him a "deposit certificate from the Offshore Atlantic Bank" in the amount of US$2 billion. Nasri and Ratna then provided funds to Jhonson for the purpose of recovering the deposited money.

Their daughter, Fathia Reza, maintained communication with Jhonson by email, and eventually received a proof of funds dated 18 September 2005, for US$500 million, payable to "HIM Princess Fathia Reza R Wiranatadikusumah Siliwangi Al Misri" and allegedly signed by Union Bank of Switzerland chairman Marcel Ospel and CEO Peter Wuffli. Convinced by their mother's story, Fathia and her sister Lamira Roro decided to further research the Sunda Empire and traveled to Singapore, Malaysia, and Brunei.

On 24 July 2007, Malaysian newspaper The Star reported that Fathia and Lamira had been detained by the Malaysian immigration authorities for attempting to enter Sarawak from Brunei using Sunda Empire diplomatic passports, allegedly issued in Basel where their parents were in "exile", and claiming to be princesses of the Sunda Empire. In January 2008, they were freed by the Sessions Court, but maintained their claim of Sunda Empire instead of Indonesian citizenship, making them ineligible for deportation to Indonesia. The Malaysian authorities, therefore, deemed them stateless individuals, and they were interned at the Machap Umboo Immigration Depot under UNHCR supervision.

=== 2020 declaration ===
In early 2020, a video declaring the existence of the Sunda Empire went viral in Indonesia, mainly spreading through Facebook and YouTube. In the video, a man claiming to be the secretary general of the empire, HRH Rangga, was explaining to a group of people wearing military-style uniforms and blue berets that Sunda Empire was a "Sun and Earth empire" and had no connection to the Sundanese people, instead being a hereditary empire currently headed by the "Sundakala dynasty". He also invited all countries in the world to "register" with the empire, which would settle debts with the World Bank by 2020.

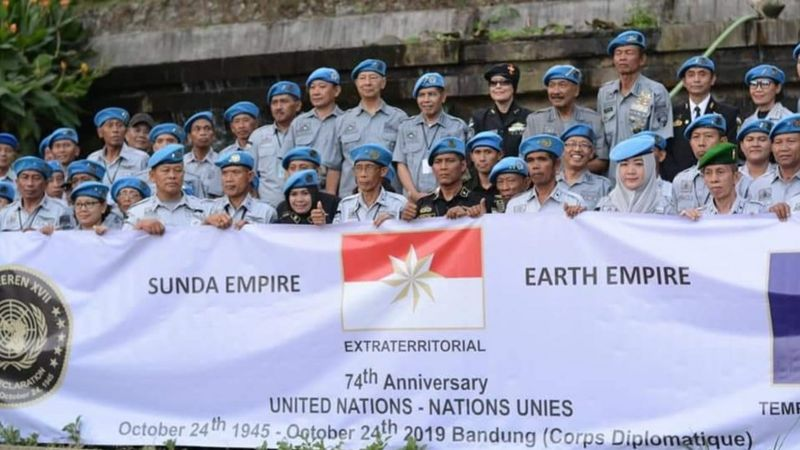
Sunda Empire activity in 2019

Further investigation revealed that the Sunda Empire had been active since 2017 and was based either in Bandung or the nearby town of Subang, West Java. It was also reported that the Indonesian Wikipedia articles for the United Nations and NATO had been vandalized with claims about Sunda Empire involvement in both organizations. On 29 January, it was reported that the Sunda Empire leading figures have been arrested for fraud.

On 18 June, Nasri explained the origins of the Sunda Empire during the trial at the Bandung State Administrative Court. He confessed that the declaration was an attempt to have his and Ratna's daughters deported back to the micronation. All three leading figures were sentenced to two years in prison for spreading false information and disturbing the peace.

In 2021, the leading figures were freed from prison as part of assimilation policies enacted due to the COVID-19 pandemic in Indonesia.

=== Aftermath ===
After being released from prison in 2021, Rangga Sasana found limited success as an Internet celebrity and conspiracy theorist. On the verge of the 2022 Russian invasion of Ukraine, he claimed to be a good friend of Vladimir Putin and that he had predicted the invasion for years. Rangga Sasana died on 7 December 2022, at age 55.

== Responses ==
The declaration of Sunda Empire was made shortly after that of the Keraton Agung Sejagat (Great Universal Kingdom), based in Purworejo, Central Java and claiming to be the successor of the Majapahit empire. In 2021, the media reported another unrecognized kingdom based in Depok, West Java called the Sunda Nusantara Kingdom. The emergence of unrecognized kingdoms has concerned academics and historical observers, who fear that romanticized accounts about their connections to ancient kingdoms could be used for deception and gaining influence.
