= Idem sonans =

Legal doctrine

Idem sonans is a legal doctrine whereby a person's identity is presumed to be known despite the misspelling of their name, if the misspelled name sounds the same when pronounced. Such similar-sounding words are called homonyms, while similar-sounding phrases or names are holorimes.

In Latin, it means "sounding the same." Some examples are Seagrave/Segrave, Hutson/Hudson, Coonrad/Conrad, Keen/Keene, and Diadema/Deadema.

In the reported cases, the doctrine usually comes up in civil cases involving enforcement of judgments, in which a purported judgment debtor or another person claiming to have a higher-priority lien against the debtor's assets argues that a judgment is unenforceable against them because the judgment debtor's name was misspelled. The doctrine also comes up in criminal cases in which the defendant claims that the operative pleading failed to adequately identify one or more persons (usually the defendant or the victim).

== United Kingdom ==
Under UK jurisdiction, there has been little judicial activity in this area. The old judgment of R v Davis provides:

"If two names spelt differently necessarily sound alike, the court may, as matter of law, pronounce them to be idem sonantia; but if they do not necessarily sound alike, the question whether they are idem sonantia is a question of fact for the jury".

The modern case of Re Vidiofusion Ltd establishes a four-stage test when a name of a company is spelled differently in writing:

- No company of a similar name
- Idem Sonantia - similar pronunciation
- No marked vision difference (judge gave example of Jackson/Jaxon being too dissimilar visually)
- Misspelling does not substantially change the placement of the name if placed in an alphabetical list.

== United States ==
Remnants of this common law doctrine exist today in the United States in the Uniform Commercial Code. Name changes can mislead searchers of official records of titles or liens. Article 9 of the UCC states that a financing statement shall not perfect a valid security interest if a name change would be "seriously misleading.". A creditor may gain priority over other creditors in the event of a bankruptcy by filing a financing statement. The financing statement contains information relevant to the secured transaction and puts other creditors on notice that the filer has a secured interest in the property. Should the filer use a debtor name that is substantially different from the debtor's actual name, the purpose of filing the financing statement is defeated. On the other hand, if there is a minor difference in spelling or an idem sonans, the error is not fatal, but only if it is not seriously misleading. The actual search results may reveal a debtor with a similar name and address which would put the researcher on notice to investigate further, which is the purpose of the filing in the first place. The legal effect of an idem sonans is that the minor name difference shall have no bearing on the priority of debtors.

In the context of criminal law, idem sonans is used to affirm criminal convictions when the defendant points to variances between the names of persons as spelled in the pleadings and the actual names of those persons as revealed by the evidence presented at trial. For example, in Texas, transposing the first and last names of the victim in a pleading is not idem sonans, because the reversed name is not merely misspelled but has a different pronunciation from the correct name.

There is some movement away from this doctrine under modern New York common law, especially in conveyancing. That means a creditor filing a judgment lien or a title abstract company searching title to real property by a deed filed in an office of a county clerk must search by exact name, and cannot rely on idem sonans.

California is also showing movement away from this common law doctrine in the context of real property transfers. In 1988, the Court of Appeal for the Fourth Appellate District held that the doctrine still applies for the "purposes of identification", but refused to apply the doctrine to hold that an abstract of judgment with a misspelled name imparts constructive notice of its contents. The New Hampshire Supreme Court in 1994 took a stance on this doctrine and said "We concur with the court in Orr that "the simple alternative is to require [attachment creditors] simply to spell the names of their ... debtors properly.""

== See also ==
- Identification (disambiguation)
- Notary public
- Acknowledgment (law)
- Affirmation
- Genealogy
- Real property
- Title search
