= Republic Broadcasting Network =

Radio network

- Industry: radio
- Founded: 2005
- Headquarters: Round Rock, Texas
- Key people: John Stadtmiller
- Products: radio

Republic Broadcasting Network (RBN) is a satellite, shortwave, and Internet radio operation based in the state of Texas. It was founded by John Stadtmiller, who advertised it as a "truth radio station" with the motto "Real News, Real Talk, Real People ... Because You CAN Handle The Truth". In 2010, it received publicity in the news after one of its broadcasters was revealed to be a leader in the Guardians of the Free Republics, a Sovereign Citizen-affiliated group that had sent threatening letters to all 50 United States governors. The network has loose ties to the Willis Carto-founded American Free Press newspaper, which was described by political scientist George Michael as "the most important newspaper of the radical right".

== Programming ==
Broadcasters on RBN include founder John Stadtmiller and his National Intel Report, Michael Rivero with the What Really Happened Radio Show, Resurrect the Republic TRUTH Radio Broadcast with Tom Lacovara-Stewart and Bruce Ray Riggs, and more. Weekend programs include names like Spingola Speaks with Deanna Spingola, Gun Owner’s News Hour with Larry Pratt, Govern America with Darren Weeks, and The Common Sense Show with Dave Hodges.

A man who goes by the name "Mike S." has been a producer and board-operator/audio-engineer at the network's headquarters north of Austin in Round Rock, Texas since 2007. He currently mans the control room from Wednesday at 3pm CT through Friday 11:59pm CT.

Mike S. is the current owner and sole proprietor of RBN.

Other long-time operators control the network at other times.

Rachel Blevins began her career at RBN before becoming the public face of Russian media outlet RT America.

== Guardians of the Free Republics controversy ==
In 2010, Sam Kennedy, who hosted the Take No Prisoners show on RBN, caused controversy after it was reported that he was a key figure in the Sovereign citizen movement and that he was a leader in the anti-government group Guardians of the Free Republics. The Guardians of the Free Republics had sent letters to the governors of all 50 states urging them to resign immediately, and threatening them with arrest by the "Provost Marshal" if they did not resign from their corporate office and swear out a new oath to the "dejure republic"; this sparked a flurry of coverage in the news media. Two months prior to this incident, Kennedy had sent a mass e-mail to his supporters saying that he would provide a "final remedy to the enslavement at the hands of corporations posing as legitimate government," said that he would "end economic warfare and political terror by March 31, 2010".

John Stadtmiller, distanced himself from Kennedy, saying he "is the focal point of this, these guardians. He was in the mix in setting this whole thing up, and he's up to his eyeballs in this Restore America project." Stadtmiller also criticized Kennedy's plan, saying "I talked to Kennedy a half-hour ago and ... I told him I'm getting a lot of heat, that you stirred the pot here, and that your plan for how to deal with the media and let them know what is going on has failed miserably." Kennedy was interviewed by the FBI in connection with the letters, which were construed as a direct threat to all 50 governors but without action from the United States Army Provost Marshal General have little legal effect. Kennedy's show is not currently on RBN's schedule, nor is he currently listed as a host on its website.

== Broadcast ==
It streams its programs live online at the network's website.

== See also ==
- Alternative media
- Talk radio
