= Guardians of the Free Republics =

Defunct group in Texas, United States

Guardians of the Free Republics, active around 2010, was a group based in the U.S. state of Texas regarded as being part of the sovereign citizen movement. The group was associated with Sam Kennedy (whose real name is Glenn Richard Unger), a talk-show host, and with Clive Boustred, a British-born conspiracy theorist living in California. The group was described as having an anti-government ideology.

== Ideology ==
The group was described as an anti-government group and as associated with the sovereign citizen movement. Federal Bureau of Investigation (FBI) Special Agent J.J. Klaver said.

"These are individuals who reject all forms of government and they believe they are emancipated from all the responsibilities associated with being U.S. citizens, such as paying taxes and obeying laws." Hal Epperson, coordinator of the group's unit in Phoenix, Arizona, stated that the group was "a nonviolent group that has a lawful remedy for the corporate government."

Some members of the group stated that they were influenced by Martin Luther King Jr. and Mohandas Gandhi. On their website, the Guardians of the Free Republics called for a "Restore America Plan" that included a "bold achievable strategy for behind-the-scenes peaceful reconstruction of the de jure institutions of government without controversy, violence or civil war." The group advocated the end of "tax prosecutions for resisting the transfer of private wealth to foreign banking cartels" and issuing "orders to the military and police powers to enforce the Peoples’ divine rights of birth." The Guardian of the Free Republics stated that they wanted to accomplish their goals "Behind the scenes, lawfully, peacefully, without violence and without risking civil war." A section of their website titled "Rationale" laid out the ideas behind the group's goal to "restore Biblical law to a devoutly secular population." The group believed its plan could act as a "vehicle for relieving corporate tyranny. In due time, the higher goal of salvaging the souls of mankind can be addressed."

== Governor letters ==
During the week of March 31, 2010, all 50 U.S. state governors received letters from the group, warning them to leave office within three days or be removed. Governor Mike Beebe of Arkansas said, "It basically said, resign, ask for forgiveness and then we'll reinstate you, and if you sign this we'll consider you re-elected."

The FBI and the Department of Homeland Security stated that they did not believe the group was violent. Some investigators believed, however, that the letters could cause others to commit violent acts. John Stadtmiller, who runs Republic Broadcasting Network in Round Rock, Texas, which broadcast Sam Kennedy's weekly show, said that Kennedy was behind the idea of sending out the letters. The FBI interviewed Kennedy for two hours on April 2, 2010, but did not arrest him. The interview concentrated on two shows Kennedy did about the "Restore America" project, in which Kennedy set a March 31, 2010 deadline as the day to "begin to reclaim the continent."

== Aftermath ==
In March 2011, an "elder" of the Guardians of the Free Republics organization named Samuel Lynn Davis pleaded guilty to 31 counts of money laundering in Federal district court in Nevada. Davis was snared in a sting operation after he agreed to launder more than $1.29 million in what he believed to be illicit funds. Davis accepted $73,782 in fees to launder the money, not realizing he was dealing with Federal law enforcement agents. In October 2011, Davis was sentenced to four years and nine months in Federal prison, and was ordered to pay over $95,000 in restitution. In late July 2012 Davis was classified as a fugitive after having failed to surrender to authorities to begin his prison sentence in June 2012. On August 7, 2012, Davis was arrested by sheriff's deputies in White Earth, North Dakota. Davis was incarcerated at the Federal Correctional Institution – La Tuna in Anthony, Texas, near El Paso, and was released on April 24, 2017.

On September 18, 2012, James Timothy ("Tim") Turner, one of the individuals involved in sending the letters to the state governors, was arrested after having been indicted by a federal grand jury in Alabama on one count of conspiracy to defraud the United States under 18 U.S.C. § 371 by, among other things, filing a false 300 million dollar bond in an attempt to pay taxes, one count of passing a false 300 million dollar bond, five additional counts of violations of section 514(a)(2) of title 18 of the U.S. Code (relating to fictitious documents), one count of filing false Form 1096 reports with the Internal Revenue Service, one count of willful failure to file a federal income tax return, and one count of giving false testimony in a federal bankruptcy proceeding. On March 22, 2013, Turner was found guilty on all charges. On July 31, 2013, he was sentenced to 18 years in Federal prison.

On December 29, 2012, "Dr. Sam Kennedy", whose real name is Glenn Richard Unger, was arrested after having been indicted on one count of attempting to interfere with the administration of the internal revenue laws under Internal Revenue Code section 7212(a), four counts of filing false claims for tax refunds under 18 USC section 287, one count of tax evasion under Internal Revenue Code section 7201, and one count of uttering a fictitious obligation under 18 USC section 514(a)(2). He was charged with filing more than $36 million in fraudulent federal income tax refund claims. On January 2, 2013, a federal prosecutor asserted in a court hearing for Unger that Unger was a danger to the community and that Unger had stated that he would rather die than become subject to the government. The indictment alleged, among other things, that in June 2011 Unger submitted false documents with the Clerk's Office of Saratoga County, New York, in an attempt to release a $116,410.43 federal tax lien against him, for taxes and penalties for years 2004, 2005, and 2006. The Federal Bureau of Investigation began looking at Unger (alias "Sam Kennedy") in the spring of 2010, after the incident involving the letters sent to the state governors. Prosecutors also charged that Unger filed no valid federal income tax returns between 1999 and 2005. On May 23, 2013, the court ordered a mental competency hearing for Unger after he referred to himself as being "deceased". On August 7, 2013, the Court ruled that Unger was competent to stand trial. After a four-day trial Unger was found guilty of all charges by a jury in Federal court in Albany, New York, on October 21, 2013. On April 21, 2014, Unger was sentenced to eight years in Federal prison.

As of March 2011, the web site for Guardians of the Free Republics had been taken down.
