= UCC-1 financing statement =

United States legal form

A UCC-1 financing statement (an abbreviation for Uniform Commercial Code-1) is a United States legal form that a creditor files to give notice that it has or may have an interest in the personal property of a debtor (a person who owes a debt to the creditor as typically specified in the agreement creating the debt). This form is filed in order to "perfect" a creditor's security interest by giving public notice that there is a right to take possession of and sell certain assets for repayment of a specific debt with a certain priority. Such notices of sale are often found in the local newspapers. Once the form has been filed, the creditor establishes a relative priority with other creditors of the debtor. This process is also called "perfecting the security interest" in the property, and this type of loan is a secured loan. A financing statement may also be filed in the real estate records by a lessor of fixtures to establish the priority of the lessor's rights against a holder of a mortgage or other lien on the real property. The creditor's rights against the debtor and the lessor's rights against the lessee are based on the credit documents and the lease, respectively, and not the financing statement.

Pursuant to the standards set forth in the UCC, at 9-503 and 9-504, the financing statement need only contain three pieces of information:

1. the debtor's name and address
2. the creditor's name and address
3. an indication of the collateral, "whether or not it is specific, if it reasonably identifies what is described." (UCC 9-108)

The financing statement is generally filed with the office of the state secretary of state, in the state where the debtor is located — for an individual, the state where the debtor resides, for most kinds of business organizations the state of incorporation or organization. Many states have a state agency which operates under the secretary of state and is tasked with overseeing business organizations and activities, including receipt of financing statements. However, an exception exists if the collateral is something that is tied to a particular piece of real property, such as timber, mineral rights, or fixtures. In that case, the filing must be made in the county where the property is located, usually in the recording office or county court, because that is where third parties are most likely to search for such record.

In the case of a loan secured by personal property collateral, the filing of a financing statement gives notice of a lien against the property so that other lenders or buyers of the personal property will know of the security interest. In the case of a filing of a financing statement by a lessor of fixtures, the filing of the financing statement gives notice of the lessor's interests to others who acquire an interest in the real property and related fixtures. The financing statement does not create a lien nor does it create any additional rights against a lessee in favor of a lessor; the filing of a financing statement just gives notice of whatever rights the creditor or lessor has under their loan documents or lease, respectively.

A filed financing statement typically has a duration of five years from when it was filed before a lapse may occur. Upon a lapse, a financing statement is no longer effective and any security interest that was perfected by the financing statement becomes unperfected. A secured party can continue their security interest by filing a continuation six months before the expiration date of the financing statement.
