= Pseudolaw =

Falsehood or trickery presented as law

Pseudolaw consists of statements, beliefs, or practices that are claimed to be based on accepted law or legal doctrine but have no actual basis in law and are generally rooted in conspiracy theories. Pseudolegal arguments deviate significantly from most conventional understandings of law and jurisprudence and often originate from non-existent statutes or legal principles. The term Organized Pseudolegal Commercial Arguments (OPCA) was coined in a 2012 Canadian court decision as an umbrella term for pseudolegal tactics and arguments, and has since been used by lawyers and legal scholars in Commonwealth countries.

It may be used by people who engage in vexatious or frivolous litigation. The more extreme examples of pseudolegal tactics have been classified as paper terrorism – sheer harassment rather than a genuine attempt to argue one's legal position.

Litigants who use pseudolaw frequently rely on techniques and arguments promoted and sold – sometimes as "kits" – by amateur legal theorists, who are commonly called "gurus" by courts, scholars and media. People offering unorthodox and unlicensed legal services are likely to be charlatans or scammers.

Pseudolaw typically appeals to people seeking a remedy for their financial or legal problems, or against perceived government excesses and intrusions. It has been used to challenge certain laws, taxes and sentences, in attempts to escape debt or avoid foreclosure, as part of financial schemes, and also to deny the jurisdiction of courts or even the legitimacy of governments. It is a common tactic of tax protesters and conspiracy theorists. Journalists and scholars have described pseudolaw as so unorthodox that it more closely resembles magic ceremony or mental illness than any recognizable form of legitimate legal practice. Arguments derived from pseudolaw have never been accepted in court and can be harmful to the people using them. Pseudolitigation may also waste considerable judicial time.

== History ==
The history of pseudolaw is poorly documented, including by its own adherents. Pseudolaw seems to have existed in the United States since the 1950s, and possibly much earlier. Idiosyncratic legal theories challenging the legitimacy of government or taxes were observed in Canada as early as the 1930s. The development of pseudolaw was fostered in the United States by the farm crisis of the late 20th century: from the 1980s, former North Dakota farmer Roger Elvick advocated fraudulent tax avoidance and anti-government schemes in what became known as the redemption movement. In Canada, local tax protesters imported fiscal misconceptions of US origin during the 1980s and 1990s. The advent of the Internet later facilitated the spreading of pseudolegal ideas and concepts, which matured around 1999–2000 in the United States, where they were at that point hosted by the sovereign citizen movement. During the same period, sovereign citizen theories were introduced into Canada, first through the "Detaxer" movement initiated by Eldon Warman, who reframed Elvick's theories and US sovereign citizen ideology to better suit a Commonwealth context. Detaxer ideology was further adapted by the freeman on the land movement, which spread to other Commonwealth countries during the 2000s. Since the late 2000s, the sovereign citizen movement has enjoyed a significant resurgence, due to the Great Recession. Later on, the COVID-19 pandemic increased the movement's spread.

The Internet has facilitated the spread of pseudolegal concepts, but also the rapid splintering of pseudolaw movements into different factions with varied, often conflicting ideologies. While the sovereign citizen movement originated in the American far right and in white supremacist ideologies, the freeman on the land movement tends to attract a left wing population and sovereign citizen concepts are now being used by African Americans and people from other minority groups. In the United States and Canada, pseudolaw has been used by Indigenous groups as well as by those claiming inauthentic indigenous identities, and by other ethnic groupings such as the "Moorish" sovereign citizens.

Outside the United States and Canada, pseudolaw has appeared in various English-speaking countries, including the United Kingdom, Australia, New Zealand, Ireland and South Africa.

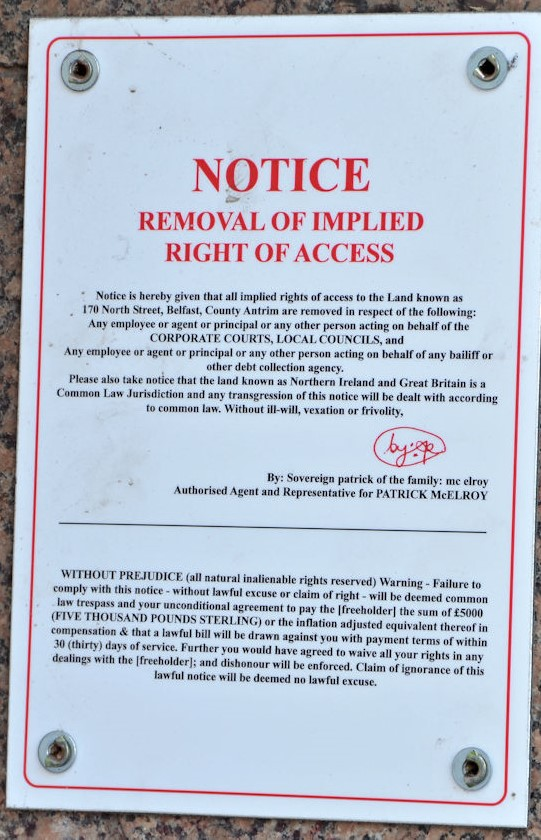
False public notice in Belfast, containing pseudolegal sovereign citizen language and a reference to the strawman theory

Freeman on the land ideology reached the United Kingdom and Ireland in the late 2000s. Irish and British "gurus" have imported the core ideas of North American pseudolaw, while also using Ireland and UK-specific concepts and references. In Ireland, it notably developed after the burst of a real-estate bubble in the late 2000s, which drastically reduced property values, causing financial stresses and foreclosures and leading people to seek solutions to their financial woes. One striking feature of Irish pseudolaw is the appearance of a political party, Direct Democracy Ireland, created by Ben Gilroy, a promoter of anti-foreclosure concepts and conspiracy theories. As in Ireland, pseudolaw is mostly used in the UK for economic reasons, by people wishing to avoid taxes or to escape government regulations.

Pseudolaw is firmly present in Australia and New Zealand; Australia is notable for having developed its own version of pseudolaw as early as the 1980s, with local gurus devising Australia-specific schemes to defeat the government. Some Australians, however, litigate as freemen on the land. The Australian freeman on the land movement has notably recruited Indigenous Australians. Unlike in Australia, New Zealand litigants have not developed theories specific to their country and show influence from various foreign sources. Many New Zealand pseudolaw litigants, however, are Maori who base their claims on their ethnic status.

In South Africa, the author Michael Tellinger promoted schemes based on fiscal misconceptions and, purportedly, on Ubuntu philosophy; he also made an unsuccessful foray into politics by creating the Ubuntu Party. Other South African gurus show American, Canadian or British influences.

Pseudolegal theories and schemes are disseminated and advertised through websites, isolated documents, texts of varying length, seminars, radio broadcasts, instructional DVDs and, above all, YouTube videos. Litigants who use it generally dispense with real legal counsel, in part because it is unethical for lawyers to make frivolous arguments. Pseudolaw gurus may occasionally appear in court, though in most cases their followers are left to represent themselves.

Pseudolaw has been used by people wishing to ignore certain rules or to avoid inconveniences such as paying license fees and traffic tickets, but also as a means to commit serious offenses such as tax evasion or as part of fraudulent schemes like mortgage elimination.

Some groups of sovereign citizens have created "common law courts" to handle matters regarding movement members, or to issue "judgments" devoid of legal authority against real or perceived enemies. Other sham organizations created by sovereign citizens include false "arbitration" entities, which will issue "rulings" against their client's creditors or other targets.

American pseudolaw gurus have been promoting their strategies in other countries, sometimes making little or no effort to adapt their material to local contexts. This has resulted in peculiar incidents, such as Canadian litigants filing documents which alluded to U.S. legislation.

Pseudolaw has also been exported outside the English-speaking world, in countries such as Germany and Austria, where it has been adapted to culturally distinct populations. While it has thrived in some countries, it has gone quickly extinct in others such as Norway. Early attempts in Belgium and the Netherlands were unsuccessful, probably due to their not having developed appropriate schemes for local civil law jurisdictions. However, times of social or economic crisis have also allowed pseudolaw to gain traction in civil law countries. In France, pseudolegal discourses gradually became popular among conspiracy theorists during the 2010s. Notably, during the yellow vests protests it was alleged that a 2016 decree had nullified the Constitution of France by infringing on the separation of powers, thus rendering Emmanuel Macron's 2017 election invalid. The sovereign citizen movement eventually gained adherents in France, as well as in Belgium.

During the COVID-19 pandemic, pseudolegal arguments have been used by anti-mask and anti-vaccine activists in several countries. Business owners and individuals have also tried to escape coronavirus restrictions by citing irrelevant documents such as obsolete clauses of Magna Carta.

== Pseudolegal doctrine and theory ==
Judicial conceptions of pseudolaw have typically characterised pseudolegal arguments as nonsensical and motivated by desperation, mental illness, financial exploitation, conspiratorial thinking, and political extremism. Although pseudolegal arguments purport to reflect a neutral conception of the law based on natural rights, the common law, constitutionalism, and the social contract, the historical and cultural underpinnings of pseudolaw are based on conspiracy theories, and are often influenced by the radical right-wing views from proponents in the United States.

In particular, sovereign citizens often argue that, because they do not consent to the authority of the state, they are exempt from liability, believing that a "social contract" exists between an individual and the state, which can be repudiated or otherwise rendered void. One variant of this theory, known as the strawman theory, holds that every individual has both a 'flesh and blood' (physical) and 'strawman' (legal) identity, only the latter of which is subject to legal liability. More conspiratorial variants of pseudolaw may hold that the jurisdiction of the state is entirely illegitimate or invalid due to pseudohistorical reasons.

The predominant response of state officials, including judges and law enforcement authorities, to pseudolegal proponents characterises the contemporary political movement as abusive to legal processes and potentially conducive to political violence and domestic terrorism. An article in Journal of Law and Society criticised this approach as overly dismissive and argued that while pseudolegal theories have no legitimacy, more effort should be made to understand and analyze the viewpoints of their proponents. Some legal scholars have also conceptualised pseudolaw as an alternative legal system itself, with some adherents espousing an alternative theory of law that claims to be legitimate.

=== Legal history ===
Pseudolaw theories often trace their historical origin to the Bible, medieval English common law, and the United States Constitution.

Pseudolegal arguments are often predicated on a pseudohistorical view of the past that holds that the jurisdiction of a state is invalid or otherwise illegitimate.

Pseudolaw comprises false, purported legal rules that fail to conform to the standards of ordinary law. Pseudolegal arguments are often made in the absence of relevant case law and misinterpret real legal doctrines in unconventional ways. Pseudolaw, like pseudoscience, is often used by gurus as a kind of quackery or snake oil scam to sell courses or other products for financial gain. Pseudolegal thought is also pseudohistorical, relying on distorted views of the history of Anglo-American common law.

=== Common beliefs ===
Donald J. Netolitzky has identified six core concepts in what he calls the "Pseudolaw Memeplex":

- The "everything is a contract" theory: as conceptualized by freeman on the land "guru" Robert Arthur Menard, governments have no special inherent authority via legislation or other means, unless one agrees to be subject to said authority. The social contract is therefore an individual rather than a collective choice, and people can reject government authority as a contract offer. Practically any interaction with a state actor is a potential, invisible, "contract" that can trap the individual into binding obligations by creating a "joinder"; however, individuals can make themselves immune from laws and government authorities by refusing to "consent" to them. The fundamental flaw in this key pseudolegal concept is that government and court authority is not a product of individual "consent", nor is the relationship between the state and an individual based on "contract".
- The "silence means agreement" rule: silence is deemed consent for any sort of documents, and any claim or alleged statement of fact placed in a sworn document (often called, in pseudolegal jargon, "affidavit of truth") is purportedly proven true, unless rebutted. This belief, which derives from a misinterpretation of the legal maxim "He who does not deny, admits", is coupled with the "invisible contracts" concept in that it implies that people should always be taking steps to avoid public authorities' "contract offers".
- There is no crime if there is no injured party: based on a misinterpretation of tort law, this concept implies that criminal prosecution cannot enforce prohibitions as long as no one was harmed.
- The state's authority is somehow defective or limited: this generally implies that certain regulations—or all regulations—are illegitimate and can be safely ignored if one uses the correct procedures or references.
- The strawman theory, considered by Netolitzky to be the most innovative component of pseudolaw: an individual has two personas, one of flesh and blood, and the other a separate legal personality (i.e., the "strawman") and all debts, liabilities, taxes and legal responsibilities apply to the strawman rather than the flesh and blood persona. Many arguments linked to the strawman theory revolve around the "legal name fraud" movement, which believes that birth certificates give the state legal ownership of a personal name and refusing to use this name therefore removes oneself from a court's jurisdiction. Various groups advocate that one can avoid this state ownership by distinguishing between capitalized and non-capitalized versions of one's name, or by adding punctuation to one's name. The use in documents of thumbprints and signatures in red ink is meant to distinguish "flesh and blood" people from the fictitious "strawman", since black and blue inks are believed to indicate corporations.
- Various misconceptions and conspiracy theories about taxes (thought to be illegitimate), banks (thought to "create money from thin air", which implies that a borrower has no obligation to pay them back; variations on this theme include that the borrower's signature creates the money, or that money is worthless unless backed by gold) and ways to extract money from the government (also called "money for nothing" schemes). Some of these concepts, linked to the strawman theory, imply that a secret fund is created for everyone at birth by the government, and that a procedure exists to "redeem" or reclaim money from this fund: this is a core belief of the redemption movement.

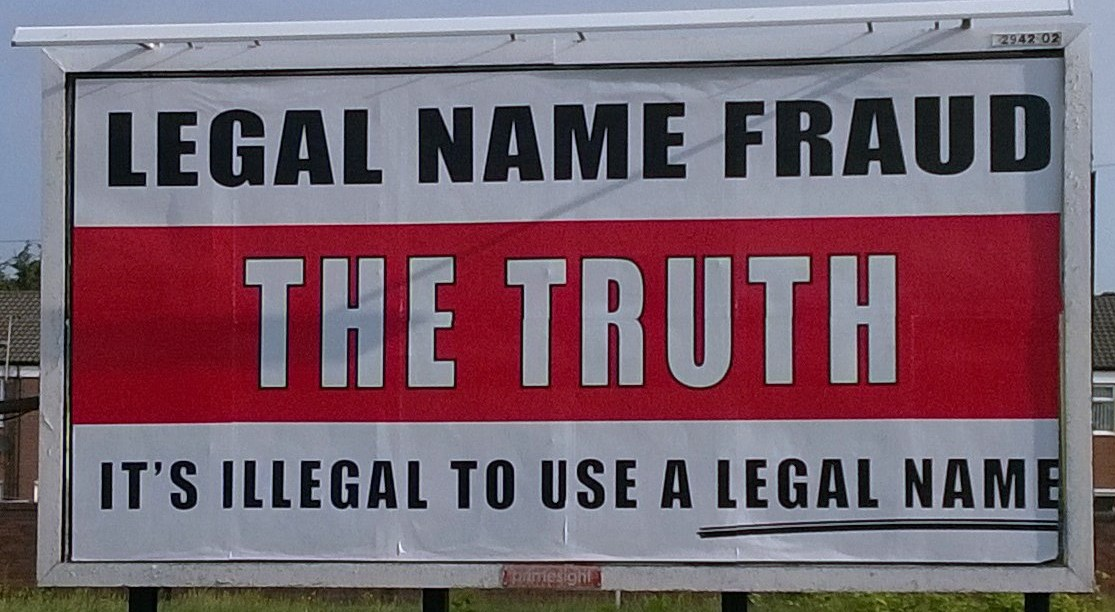
Billboard promoting the freeman on the land "legal name fraud" conceit in the United Kingdom

Another common pseudolegal belief is that individuals possess partial or full sovereignty independent from the government of the country in which they live, and that no laws, or only certain laws, apply to the believer. Groups espousing such beliefs include the freemen on the land and the sovereign citizen movements, whose ideologies are based on idiosyncratic interpretations of "common law". Some, such as the Reichsbürgerbewegung ("Reich Citizens' Movement") groups in Germany, believe that their state itself is illegitimate.

The "common law" on which pseudolegal theories are purportedly based rests heavily on a distorted image of traditional English law, mixing authentic but misinterpreted legal maxims with obsolete, typically medieval, documents such as Magna Carta, as well as actual fabrications. Other irrelevant sources often cited in pseudolaw include the Uniform Commercial Code, the Articles of Confederation, or the Bible. American pseudolegal theorists tend to reinterpret the Constitution of the United States through a selective reading of legal dictionaries, notably an obsolete version of Black's Law Dictionary. Irish pseudolaw gurus have referenced Brehon law rather than English law as the ancient and original source of law in Ireland.

Also under the umbrella of pseudolegal arguments are conspiracy theorists who believe there is a secret parallel legal system that one can access through specific means, like using a secret phrase, certain forms of unconventional legalese (one extreme example being the constructed language known as "Quantum Grammar", a purported "correct" language which is actually incomprehensible to courts as well as to most people), Latin maxims, grandiose language, or irregular formalities such as stamps placed on specific documents or thumbprints in red ink.

Various schemes involve postage stamps. However, the stamp motif is inconsistent: depending on the guru, the theory may be that adding a stamp to a document and signing one's name over the stamp will lend authority to the document and achieve a specific legal effect, or that stamps change the nature of the document and turn it into an enforceable contract, or that they are "lawful money", or that their use creates "common law copyright". According to one version, the use of stamps transforms documents into correspondence, which is governed by the Universal Postal Union (considered by pseudolaw affiliates to be a supranational authority). Therefore, using stamps on legal documents purportedly makes one a "postmaster" with peer status among nation state. None of these ideas has any basis in law. The Universal Postal Union has officially denied having the authority which sovereign citizens and similar movements attribute to it, and has specified that "the use of postage stamps on legal documents does not create an opportunity or obligation for the UPU to become involved in those matters".

One theory, espoused by American sovereign citizens, is that the United States' legal system was at some point secretly replaced with admiralty law (understood as a form of commercial law governing international trade) as part of a broader conspiracy which replaced the legitimate American government with a business corporation. This leads sovereign citizens to consider that U.S. judges and lawyers are actually agents of a foreign power and that American courts, being admiralty courts, have no jurisdiction over people. The origin of that particular theory is unclear, though it may stem from the fact that some nautical-sounding terms such as "dock" or "birth (homophone with "berth") – certificate" are commonly used by English-language judiciaries. Local variations of that theory can be found in other countries, such as the United Kingdom. One particular theory linked to maritime concepts, and notably popular among British freemen on the land, relies on a misinterpretation of the English Cestui Que Vie Act 1666 which stated that a person missing at sea shall be assumed to be dead after seven years. The pseudolegal interpretation of this Act alleges that the government will assume any person to be legally dead from the age of seven and will thereafter consider their person and/or property as its possessions.

Another conspiracy theory holds that all American lawyers are agents for the British Crown, to which they swear "treasonous secret oaths of allegiance", and that "BAR" is an acronym for "British Accredited Registry".

The unpassed Titles of Nobility Amendment has been invoked to challenge the legitimacy of the courts because lawyers sometimes use the informal title of esquire.

Sovereign citizens also attribute a particular power to the Uniform Commercial Code, which they claim is a codification of the illegitimate commercial law ruling the United States. Therefore, they consider that the documents for which the UCC provides standards, like drivers' licenses, as well as the associated laws and financial obligations, apply only to their "strawman" and not to them. They will also attempt to exploit certain perceived loopholes in the UCC to assert their rights, or invoke their status as "common law citizens".

=== Other theories ===
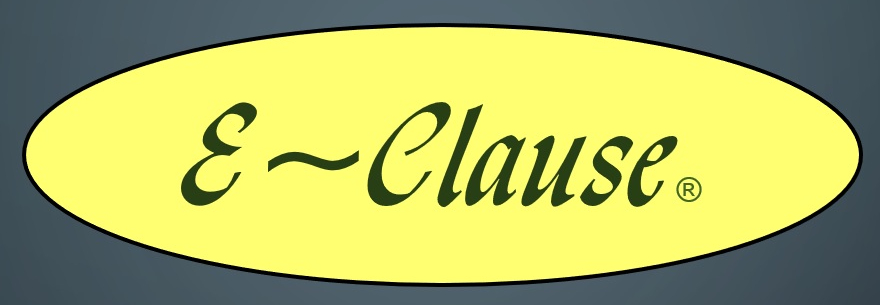
Logo of E-Clause, a sovereign citizen pseudolaw firm

People involved in pseudolaw may use unlikely arguments and be adherents of various other conspiracy theories and sometimes fantastical beliefs. Defendants may, for example, attempt to deny the court's jurisdiction over them by claiming that they are neither citizens nor residents of the country where the trial takes place, regardless of their birthright and actual residence status.

One version of the strawman theory, promoted by Canadian "Detaxer" guru Russell Porisky, is that one can avoid paying taxes by proclaiming to be a "natural person", in opposition to the government's version of a "person" (i.e., a juridical person). Porisky was eventually sentenced in 2016 to five and a half years in prison for tax evasion. In 2010, David Kevin Lindsay, another Canadian advocate of "Detaxer" concepts, tested a variation of this idea by arguing that he should not be paying taxes because, since 1996, he was no longer a "person" as defined by the Income Tax Act but rather "a full liability free will flesh and blood living man". His claims were rejected by the Supreme Court of British Columbia.

American sovereign citizen and redemption guru Winston Shrout, who advocated tax resistance for twenty years and was ultimately imprisoned, mixed his pseudolegal and pseudoeconomic theories with claims that he was an "Earth delegate to the interdimensional Galactic Round Table" and a "sixth-dimensional interplanetary diplomat" and that he once disrupted international transactions by relocating the prime meridian with the assistance of the Queen of the Fairies.

Another sovereign citizen guru, Russell Jay Gould, claims that autographing a postal receipt and filing in the Federal Courts a document pursuant to Title 4 of the United States Code, at a moment when the country was secretly bankrupt, prevented the United States from turning back into a British colony and granted him the office of "Postmaster-General", thus making him the "sovereign king" of the United States with sweeping powers over governments, banks and courts.

An American guru, Heather Ann Tucci-Jarraf, claimed that the Uniform Commercial Code – which she called the "Universal Commercial Code" – applied to the whole world and that she and her group, the One People's Public Trust, had "foreclosed" and "cancelled" all banks and governments through the use of the UCC. She also advocated "money for nothing" schemes. In 2018, she and one of her associates were convicted of bank fraud, wire fraud and conspiracy to launder money; they tried to have their convictions overturned by claiming that because of their beliefs, they should not have been allowed by the court to proceed pro se. The U.S. Court of Appeals for the Sixth Circuit rejected that argument and upheld the convictions. Apart from their pseudolegal activity, Tucci-Jarraf and her group have also been involved in developing "free energy technologies" in Morocco.

Christopher Hallett, from Florida, and his associate Kirk Pendergrass, from Idaho, operated a company called E-Clause that offered amateur legal services based on sovereign citizen ideology. They advertised their activities through a social media community that included QAnon supporters and flat earthers. E-Clause focused on child custody cases and was notably aimed at mothers whose children had been removed from their care; it also associated with the "Pentagon Pedophile Task Force", a QAnon-affiliated group of conspiracy theorists. Hallett claimed that then-president Donald Trump had authorized him to create a separate legal system; in January 2020, a federal judge commented, upon dismissing one of Hallett's lawsuits, "The Court declines to entertain Plaintiff's fantasy that he is acting at the behest of the President". In November 2020, Hallett was murdered by one of his followers and clients, Neely Petrie-Blanchard, a QAnon adherent who had relied on him to win back custody of her children but had come to believe that he conspired against her. Pendergrass suggested that Hallett had been killed by the "deep state".

The lawyer Colin McRoberts commented in 2016, after attending pseudolegal seminars held by conspiracy theorists, including Winston Shrout:

Pseudolaw isn’t harmless. It ruins lives. It sends people to prison. [It] has the potential to wreck the lives of well-meaning people. (...) People who believe they can skate their way out of taxes with these phony theories stop paying, and it starts an ugly spiral. Soon they owe so much in back taxes that they have to believe in these theories to have any sort of peace of mind, because otherwise they’d feel the sword of Damocles over their heads. So they dig in, fight their lawsuits, and lose. Every. Single. Time. Or they rely on these arguments in other kinds of cases and never get their real issues heard, because they chose to stand on gibberish instead of actual facts.

== Responses from authorities ==
Followers of pseudolaw can cause problems for courts and government administrators by filing unusual, numerous and voluminous applications that are difficult to process, or even to understand. On occasion, authorities may decide to not pursue a matter when confronted by pseudolegal tactics, due to lack of time, interest or resources: in 2010, a prosecutor in Pinellas County, Florida, confronted with paper terrorism from a sovereign citizen who refused to pay a $20 dog licence, opted to drop the case. However, while such methods may occasionally obtain similar results, or at least delay legal proceedings by encumbering courts, they are ultimately never successful in front of a judge and a jury. Pseudolegal tactics and arguments are commonly found frivolous and vexatious and there is no recorded instance of them being upheld in a court of law.

People using pseudolaw may be found guilty of abuse of process, contempt of court or, in the case of gurus, unauthorized practice of law. Some U.S. states have heightened penalties inflicted upon people who file baseless motions. American courts may also impose pre-filing injunctions against certain serial litigants, prohibiting them from filing new lawsuits or documents without prior leave.

Depending on the nature of their actions, self-proclaimed "common law" judges have been ignored, or prosecuted to the fullest extent of the law. In the United States, several hundreds of people involved in "common law courts" operated by sovereign citizens or by the Patriot movement have been arrested since the 1990s for faking legal processes, impersonating officials, and intimidation or threats against real public officials. In 1998, twenty-seven U.S. states passed legislation that outlawed the activities of these "courts" or strengthened existing sanctions. In 2018, a Colorado court ruled that the network of "common law courts" led by sovereign citizen Bruce Doucette was a racketeering enterprise akin to organized crime and sentenced Doucette to 38 years in prison.

In June 2022, Associate Chief Justice John D. Rooke of the Court of Queen's Bench of Alberta threatened to fine a lawyer for notarizing a pseudolegal document on behalf of her client. Rooke commented that the lawyer had violated basic professional rules by participating "in a scheme to harm the court, threaten its staff, unilaterally terminate criminal litigation."

During his 2022 trial, Darrell Brooks, perpetrator of the Waukesha Christmas parade attack, raised arguments based on sovereign citizen ideology. Judge Jennifer Dorow ruled that Brooks' pseudolegal arguments were without merit, and commented that sovereign citizen theories and tactics were "nonsense" that had no place in the judicial system.

In October 2023, Vancouver lawyer Naomi Arbabi, who was involved in a private dispute against a neighbor, filed a document using pseudolegal language and arguments. In December of that year, the Law Society of British Columbia suspended Arbabi's license to practise law, deeming that her actions made it "necessary to protect the public". In January 2024, the Supreme Court of British Columbia ruled that Arbabi's claim was frivolous and vexatious and ordered that she pay special costs for violating her professional oath. Arbabi resigned her license later that month.

=== Meads v. Meads Canadian court decision ===
In 2012, the Court of Queen's Bench of Alberta issued a decision pertaining to a contentious divorce case, Meads v. Meads, in which the husband called himself a freeman on the land and used pseudolegal arguments such as the strawman theory. Associate Chief Justice John D. Rooke compiled a decade of Canadian jurisprudence and American academic research about pseudolaw, covering freeman on the land, redemption and sovereign citizen arguments. Rooke coined the label Organized Pseudolegal Commercial Arguments (OPCA) as an umbrella term for such tactics, and refuted various pseudolegal arguments in detail.

Rooke also specifically called out the role of the gurus making money by promoting tactics that are not only ineffectual, but ultimately harmful to the people who use them:

Gurus claim that their techniques provide easy rewards – one does not have to pay tax, child and spousal support payments, or pay attention to traffic laws. There are allegedly secret but accessible bank accounts that contain nearly unlimited funds, if you know the trick to unlock their gates. You can transform a bill into a cheque with a stamp and some coloured writing. You are only subject to criminal sanction if you agree to be subject to criminal sanction. You can make yourself independent of any state obligation if you so desire, and unilaterally force and enforce demands on other persons, institutions, and the state. All this is a consequence of the fact gurus proclaim they know secret principles and law, hidden from the public, but binding on the state, courts, and individuals. And all these "secrets" can be yours, for small payment to the guru. These claims are, of course, pseudolegal nonsense. (...)

OPCA arguments are never sold to their customers as simple ideas, but instead are Byzantine schemes which more closely resemble the plot of a dark fantasy novel than anything else. Latin maxims and powerful sounding language are often used. Documents are often ornamented with many strange marking and seals. Litigants engage in peculiar, ritual‑like in court conduct. All these features appear necessary for gurus to market OPCA schemes to their often desperate, ill-informed, mentally disturbed, or legally abusive customers. This is crucial to understand the non-substance of any OPCA concept or strategy. The story and process of a OPCA scheme is not intended to impress or convince the Courts, but rather to impress the guru’s customer [emphasis in original]. Mediaeval alchemy is a helpful analogue. Alchemists sold their services based on the theatre of their activities, rather than demonstrated results, or any analytical or systematic methodology. OPCA gurus are modern legal alchemists. They promise gold, but their methods are principally intended to impress the gullible, or those who wish to use this drivel to abuse the court system. Any lack of legal success by the OPCA litigant is, of course, portrayed as a consequence of the customer’s failure to properly understand and apply the guru's special knowledge. (...)

When gurus do appear in court their schemes uniformly fail, which is why most leave court appearances to their customers. That explains why it is not unusual to find that an OPCA litigant cannot even explain their own materials. They did not write them. They do not (fully) understand them. OPCA litigants appear, engage in a court drama that is more akin to a magic spell ritual than an actual legal proceeding, and wait to see if the court is entranced and compliant. If not, the litigant returns home to scrutinize at what point the wrong incantation was uttered, an incorrectly prepared artifact waved or submitted. (...)

You [gurus] cannot identify one instance where a court has rolled over and behaved as told. Not one. Your spells, when cast, fail.

Meads v. Meads has since been used as case law and as a resource against pseudolegal arguments by courts in Canada and in other Commonwealth countries.

== See also ==
- Abuse of process
- Frivolous litigation
- Legal abuse
- Litigant in person
- Loophole
- Paper terrorism
- Pro se legal representation in the United States
- Pseudoscience
- Pseudohistory
- Spamigation
- The Law That Never Was
- We live in a constitutional republic.
- Vexatious litigation
