= Bruce Doucette =

Convicted American sovereign citizen

- Born: 1960 or 1961
- Occupations: Computer repair shop owner, pseudolegal activist
- Movement: Sovereign citizens
- Convictions: Participation in a racketeering enterprise Retaliation against a judge (3 counts); Attempt to influence a civil servant
- Penalty: 38 years

Details
- Date apprehended: 2017

Bruce Doucette is an American sovereign citizen "guru" and self-proclaimed judge who has been convicted of racketeering, conspiracy and other felonies, and sentenced to 38 years imprisonment in 2018.

== Life and career ==
Doucette, the owner of a computer repair shop in Littleton, Colorado, became a prominent sovereign citizen activist during the 2010s. Styling himself a "Superior Court Judge of the Continental uNited States of America" (unusual capitalization intended), he formed a group called "The People's Grand Jury in Colorado" and, among other actions, advised people in encampments in Costilla County on how to oppose land-use regulations. Doucette traveled the United States to help sovereign citizens fight local governments and set up their own irregular "common law courts". The "oath" by Doucette and his followers read: "I am the warrior protector for those who know not how to speak of the crimes against them."

In 2016, Doucette associated with Ammon Bundy and his group: at the beginning of the occupation of the Malheur National Wildlife Refuge, he announced that he would convene a "citizens grand jury" and threatened to hold "a trial with the redress of grievance" against county and other government officials. His effort to "review evidence that public officials may have committed crimes" was unsuccessful.

Doucette and his followers attempted to intimidate public officials so they would dismiss criminal cases against other sovereign citizens. When these efforts failed, Doucette's group retaliated by engaging in paper terrorism against them with false subpoenas and false liens, a common sovereign citizen harassment tactic, and threatening them with "arrest" by their self-appointed "Marshals".

Doucette and several of his associates were arrested in March 2017, and charged with multiple felony counts. Doucette acted as his own lawyer during their trial. In May 2018, Colorado's 18th Judicial District ruled that Doucette's network of "common law courts" was a racketeering enterprise equivalent to organized crime and also found Doucette guilty of retaliation against several judges and attempting to influence a public servant. He was sentenced to 38 years in prison, including 20 years for participating in a racketeering enterprise, additional consecutive terms of 4, 5 and 4 years for retaliation against three different judges, 5 years for attempting to influence a public servant and concurrent sentences for several other similar charges. Two of his co-defendants were sentenced to 36 and 22 years, respectively. At his sentencing hearing, Doucette said: “I do not consent and never have." The sentencing of Doucette and his associates was the most important crackdown on a sovereign citizen organization since the case of the Montana Freemen in 1996.
