= Kingdom Filipina Hacienda =

Sovereign citizen organization in the Philippines

- Kingdom Filipina Hacienda–Autocratic Sovereign Monarchy
- Flag
- Abbreviation: KFH
- Formation: March 28, 2008; 18 years ago
- Headquarters: Royal Castle, Pala-o
- Location: Iligan, Philippines
- Coordinates: 8°13′22.0″N 124°15′07.8″E
- Self-styled queen and prime minister: Salvacion Legaspi
- Website: royalsovereigncrown.site

The Kingdom Filipina Hacienda–Autocratic Sovereign Monarchy, or simply the Kingdom Filipina Hacienda (KFH), is an organization in the Philippines based in Iligan. Associated with the sovereign citizen movement, the group does not recognize the government of the Republic of the Philippines as legitimate.

== Background ==
The Kingdom Filipina Hacienda is a group which claims to be an autocratic sovereign monarchy. It has been extant since March 2008.

It is led by Salvacion Legaspi, a woman who style herself as "Queen Majesty" "Queen of the Motherland", and the "Alpha and Omega". Legaspi claims ownership over Philippine archipelago as the supposed descendant of a certain "King Luisong". She claims this is supported by the Treaty of Paris, various "divine scriptures and documents" and "guidance from the Holy Spirit".

It is headquartered in a building they call as the "Royal Castle" in Barangay Pala-o in Iligan. They have their own Tribunal Rural Bank and issue their own currency which they call the "euro". They do not recognize the government of the Republic of the Philippines as legitimate. The KFH claims ownership over the Philippines, calling itself as the "New Philippines". They also claim sovereignty over the Spratly Islands and the whole of Borneo island.

In 2024, KFH claim it can resolve the South China Sea dispute due to being in possession of a decree concerning territories worldwide. However it admits it does not have any appropriate military assets to deter China deferring to divine intervention.

The KFH has been linked to the sovereign citizen movement, claiming legitimacy by "divine empowerment" and "common law".

== Incidents ==
=== Iligan high school occupation ===
On December 26, 2020, Salvacion Legaspi and her followers occupied the Francisca Paradela Legazpi Memorial School in Iligan without the consent of the school administration. The city police came to intervene and arrested 24 KFH members including Legaspi.

=== KFH ambassador in Singapore ===
In May 2021, British national Benjamin Glynn was arrested for not wearing a mask in Singapore, in defiance of COVID-19 pandemic protocols, as well as harassing the police and for being a public nuisance. He insist that laws does not apply to him claiming to being a "sovereign citizen". Abdul Rashid Abdul Rahman, a Singaporean, attempted to represent Glynn in defense of a "sovereign compatriot" despite having no license to practice law. Abdul Rashid affiliates himself with the KFH claiming to be the self-styled monarchy's "ambassador-at-large and advocate". Glynn would be deported in August 2021.

Lee Hui Yin disrupted the Glynn trial calling the procedure a "kangaroo court" and was accused of disrespecting the judge. She had additional charges after she allegedly for getting into a spat with two police officers over mask mandates. Lee, also a sovereign citizen herself, likewise wanted Abdul Rashid to represent her in her case.

Abdul Rashid himself would also be charged for failing to wear a mask in two separate occasions in 2022 and invoked his status as a sovereign citizen in a bid to prove the court has no authority over him.

== See also ==
- Romana Didulo, Self-proclaimed queen of Canada and one most prominent figures of the QAnon movement in Canada
