= Washitaw Nation =

Group associated with the Moorish Science Temple of America

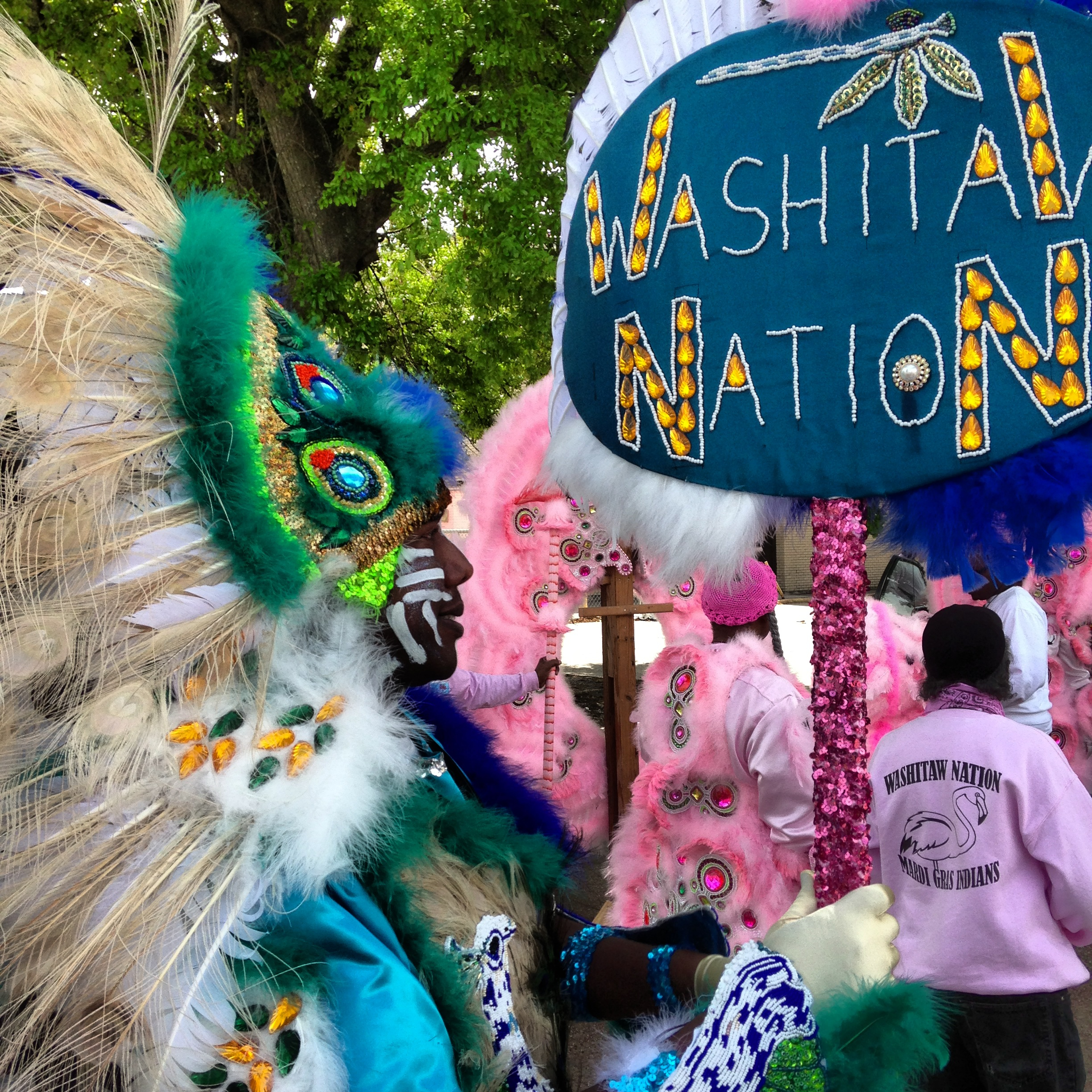
Washitaw Nation at the Mardi Gras Indians Super Sunday, New Orleans, 2014

The Washitaw Nation (Washitaw de Dugdahmoundyah) is an African-American group associated with the Moorish Science Temple of America who claim to be a sovereign state of Native Americans within the boundaries of the United States of America. Their name is appropriated from that of the Ouachita tribe, who are also eponymous of the Ouachita River, Washita River, Ouachita Parish, Louisiana, and Washita, Oklahoma. The group is part of the sovereign citizen movement, whose members generally believe that they are not subject to any statutes or proceedings at the federal, state, or municipal levels.

The Washitaw Nation was headed by Verdiacee Hampton Goston (a.k.a. Verdiacee Turner and Empress Verdiacee Tiari Washitaw Turner Goston El-Bey; c. 1927–2014). She was mayor of Richwood, Louisiana, in 1975 and 1976, and again from 1980 to 1984, and is the author of the self-published book Return of the Ancient Ones (1993). Goston asserted that the United Nations "registers the Washitaw as indigenous people No. 215".

== Classification ==
Flag of the Washitaw Nation

In 1999, the Southern Poverty Law Center estimated that the group had about 200 hardcore members, noting its popularity among followers of the Moorish Science Temple of America, a nationalist movement. The asserted legal basis for the establishment of the Washitaw Nation is a theory that individuals and groups may declare "sovereignty" and may separate themselves from state and federal governments, a concept earlier used by the Posse Comitatus. The argument is also made that Napoleon only sold "the streets of New Orleans and a military barracks" and that the rest of Louisiana was stolen from the Washitaw.

Various United States courts have held that the Washitaw Nation is fictional and is not recognized as a federally sovereign Indian Nation.

== Actions ==
The Washitaw Nation is the accrediting agent for a diploma mill, the City University of Los Angeles.
