= Sitcomm Arbitration Association =

Fraudulent arbitration company located in Wyoming

Satcomm Arbitration Association
- Industry: Law
- Services: Fraudulent arbitration based on sovereign citizen ideology

Innovated Holdings, Inc, better known under the trade name Satcomm Arbitration Association, is a "pirate" arbitration company located in Wyoming and associated with the sovereign citizen movement. It has been identified as a "sham" by courts, having filed "fraudulent arbitration awards in several states", and the Anti-Defamation League's Center on Extremism characterises it as "the largest promoter of fraudulent arbitration".

A 2021 ruling by the Court of Appeals for the Third Circuit upheld a District Court finding vacating an award made by Satcomm on the grounds that there was no evidence of a valid arbitration agreement between the parties. In another case, United States Magistrate Judge N. Reid Neureiter described Satcomm's modus operandi thus:

an extremely troubling fraudulent “arbitration” scheme whereby a supposed aggrieved party (Mr. Matios) presents an “arbitration contract” to the defending party (the City), while simultaneously declaring that a failure to respond to the contract will result, by tacit acquiescence, in a binding arbitration agreement.

The process was unilateral, as the City of Loveland had never agreed to participate in an arbitration with Matios. The "Notice of arbitration hearing" sent to the city also failed to specify the location for the purported "hearing". The supposed arbitrator in this case was identified as Bret "Eeon" Jones, a convicted sex offender and sovereign citizen who was sentenced in 2019 to three years and eight months in prison for failing to register as a sex offender, and driving without a valid licence. Although the City of Loveland had responded several times by specifying that it did not intend to participate in the arbitration, Satcomm eventually issued a "Final Arbitration Award" ordering the city to pay $300 million to Matios.

In an article in the Minnesota Law Review, the case of Teverbaugh v. Lima One Capital was analysed: "It was—as another federal judge would later proclaim—“unlike any other [that] this [c]ourt has ever seen.”", consisting of "a bizarre jumble of inconsistent, nonsensical word salad". The tactics of Satcomm are described in detail. Lima One was asserted by the purported arbitrator as having accepted the case "by silence". The award made no mention of underlying facts, but instead contained "cryptic references to the Uniform Commercial Code" (a hallmark of SovCit practices). Having been rebuffed in court, Teverbaugh filed another claim in Illinois, listing "A.M.T. Design" as plaintiff, and also filed in Mississippi. She also filed separate Satcomm arbitration claims in her favour in Illinois and Indiana, with similar language.

In August 2021, Satcomm was held jointly and severally liable for a $1,384,371.24 fine in a default judgment for violation of the Racketeer Influenced and Corrupt Organizations Act (RICO).

== See also ==
- Pseudolaw
