= Schaeffer Cox =

Figure in the American militia movement

Francis Schaeffer Cox
- Born: February 11, 1984
- Occupation: Commercial Fisherman
- Organization: Alaska Peacemakers Militia
- Known for: Militia Movement in Alaska
- Spouse: Marti Cox
- Children: Seth Justice Argus Cox
- Parent(s): Gary and Jennifer Cox

Francis August Schaeffer Cox (born February 11, 1984), known as Schaeffer Cox, is an American political activist, convicted felon, and founder of an organization called the Alaska Peacemakers Militia.

== Early life ==
Francis August Schaeffer Cox was born on February 11, 1984, to Gary and Jennifer Cox. Around the year 2000, Cox's family moved to Alaska. He received a high school diploma in May 2003 through a correspondence program. He then briefly studied business at the University of Alaska, Fairbanks, before dropping out to start his own small construction company.

== Political activities and ties ==
In 2008, Cox ran for the Alaska House of Representatives from House District 7.

Cox was a supporter of Sarah Palin, but harshly criticized her support for Real ID in 2008, saying "If Sarah Palin loses who she is, then I won't support her".

Cox was a delegate from Alaska to a gathering called the Continental Congress 2009. He was also an organizing member of the Fairbanks-based Second Amendment Task Force. At a 2009 gathering of the group, Cox drafted a declaration that the United States Government must be abolished if it further restricts gun rights. The declaration was signed by many, including United States Representative Don Young. Cox has also reportedly identified himself as a member of the sovereign citizen movement.

Cox is said to be a close friend of Alaska politician Joe Miller, although Cox has said that he did not support Miller in Miller's unsuccessful bid for the United States Senate in 2010. Cox stated, "[Miller's] going to try to run things in a more conservative way, but he's still trying to run things -- so he has the same fundamental problem of all the other politicians". After Cox was arrested, Miller released a statement saying "Mr. Miller has never had any connection to any of Mr. Cox's militia organizations, and in no way condones any lawless behavior."

== Legal problems and conviction ==
In March 2010, Cox was arrested by state authorities in Alaska for failing to disclose a concealed weapon. It was reported that he assaulted his wife and pleaded guilty to reckless endangerment, but his wife joined him to publicly deny the claims, and to explain the allegations completely as lies to defame Cox.

In 2011 he was arrested for alleged involvement in a murder conspiracy known as "241" where two law enforcement officers were to be killed for each member of the Peacemakers Militia killed in anticipation of government action against Cox and weapons charges.

In March 2011, Cox was arrested on federal charges in Fairbanks, Alaska, by the United States Marshals Service. He was charged with conspiracy to possess unregistered silencers and destructive devices, possession of an unregistered destructive device, possession of an unregistered silencer, possession of an unregistered machine gun, and other related charges under 18 U.S.C. § 371, 18 U.S.C. § 922 and 18 U.S.C. § 924 and Internal Revenue Code sections 5861(d), 5871, and 5861(f). Also charged for involvement in the plot were Lonnie Vernon, Karen Vernon and Coleman Barney. Cox's lawyers argued unsuccessfully that the charges should have been thrown out because the grand jury that served the indictment was flawed.

In late October 2011, all state charges against Cox and his fellow defendants were dismissed. The dismissals followed a court ruling that kept prosecutors from using, as evidence, secret FBI recordings made without a search warrant. According to Assistant District Attorney Dway McConnell, the state charges cannot be refiled.

Cox continued to face the federal weapons charges. In November 2011, additional federal charges were brought against him. The new charges related to the alleged purchase of hand grenades and silencers, and alleged possession of a loaded grenade launcher.

On January 20, 2012, Cox and two co-defendants were charged in the same case with conspiracy to kill officers and employees of the United States, including law enforcement officers, "in violation of Title 18, United States Code, Sections 1111 and 1114...." The trial began on May 7, 2012. The case went to the jury on Thursday, June 14, 2012.

On June 18, 2012, Cox and codefendant Lonnie Vernon were each found guilty of conspiracy to commit murder. The jury was unable to reach consensus on the conspiracy charge against codefendant Coleman Barney. Barney was, however, convicted of conspiracy to possess unregistered silencers and destructive devices and possession of unregistered destructive devices.

On September 24, 2012, Coleman L. Barney was sentenced to five years in federal prison. On January 7, 2013, Lonnie Vernon and his wife, Karen Vernon, were sentenced to 25 and 12 years, respectively.

On January 8, 2013, Cox was sentenced to 310 months, or nearly 26 years, in federal prison. The conviction and sentence were appealed in the same year. Cox was incarcerated at the Federal Correctional Institution, Terre Haute, and was originally scheduled for release October 26, 2033.

On December 13, 2013, Cox recanted his claim of mental illness and the Fairbanks Daily News-Miner published a thirteen-page letter in which he alleged the Federal government is part of a broad conspiracy that led to his conviction and sentencing. He stated, regarding a forensic psychologist who evaluated him, "She was a short frumpy woman with frizzy hair, beady eyes." She had testified that he suffers from several paranoid disorders. At the sentencing hearing, Cox told the judge, "I put a lot of people in fear by the things that I said." "Some of the crazy stuff that was coming out of my mouth, I see that, and I sounded horrible." "I couldn't have sounded any worse if I tried." "The more scared I got, the crazier the stuff. I wasn't thinking, I was panicking."

In February 2015, the United States Court of Appeals for the Ninth Circuit denied Cox permission to fire his fourth attorney, one who was currently handling his appeal.

On August 30, 2017, a three-judge panel of the 9th Circuit Court of Appeals found there wasn't evidence to uphold his conviction for solicitation to murder, but affirmed his conviction for conspiracy. Cox's sentence of nearly 26 years was vacated in light of the decision, and his case was sent to a lower court for re-sentencing.

On 5 November 2019, as a result of the appeal decision, Cox’s sentence was reduced, reports said, by 10 years, but, as of 1 Aug 2024, he is still shown as held at Residential Reentry Management (RRM) field office Seattle and his release date is shown as 6 Sep 2024. (Ten years before the original release date of October 26, 2033 would obviously have been October 26 2023, already passed, so, presumably, there'd no longer be a record for him to find on bop.gov/inmateloc GUI.)

== U.S. Supreme Court ==
In March, 2018, Cox's public defender, Michael Filipovic, filed a petition for a writ of certiorari to the United States Supreme Court. In May, the federal government's Solicitor General's office filed a brief arguing that the established facts of the case contradicted Filipovic's brief. On June 11, 2018, the Supreme Court issued a denial of certiorari. This action then re-opened the possibility that Cox's case could be sent back to a lower court for re-sentencing.

== See also ==
- Freemen on the land
