= John Joe Gray =

Texan fugitive from the law

John Joe Gray (born c. 1950) is an American who identified as a sovereign citizen and was a fugitive from the law. He lived on his 50-acre, wooded ranch in Trinidad, Texas. He was involved in the longest-running law enforcement standoff in American history, lasting a few days short of 15 years, before the district attorney dropped the charges.

== Standoff ==
The standoff began in 2000 when Gray jumped bail after indictment on two counts of felony assault. During a 1999 traffic stop in Anderson County, he allegedly attacked Texas Trooper Jim Cleland. A struggle ensued after Cleland reached for a .357 caliber handgun in the car that Gray was driving. Anti-government pamphlets and references to setting off a bomb on a highway overpass near Dallas were found in the vehicle. Gray was charged with two felonies: assault of a public servant and taking a police officer's weapon. After promising to have no access to weapons while awaiting hearing, he was out on bail before the judge held his bond insufficient, and ordered his re-arrest.

Local Henderson County Sheriff Ray Nutt stated in 2011, "This kook is not worth it. Ten of him is not worth going up there and getting one of my young deputies killed." In December 2014, the standoff officially ended when District Attorney Douglas E. Lowe dismissed the charge.
