= Spamigation =

Mass litigation conducted to intimidate large numbers of people

Spamigation is mass litigation conducted to intimidate large numbers of people. The term was coined in 2006 by Brad Templeton of the Electronic Frontier Foundation to explain the tactics of the Recording Industry Association of America (RIAA), which files large numbers of lawsuits against individuals for file sharing, and DirecTV, which once filed large numbers of lawsuits against users of smart cards.

Because of the costs of mounting a legal defense, almost all defendants in these cases tend to settle. The RIAA then used the money from these settlements to "file more suits".

Spamigation is similar to a strategic lawsuit against public participation ("SLAPP"), which is filed by a large organization, or in some cases an individual plaintiff, to intimidate and silence a less powerful critic by so severely burdening them with the cost of a legal defense that they abandon their criticism. Spamigation differs in that it aims at stopping an economic activity, in the case of the RIAA's lawsuits the copying of copyrighted material.

== See also ==
- Abuse of process
- Chilling effect
- Frivolous litigation
- Lawfare
- Paper terrorism
- Pseudolaw
- Strategic lawsuit against public participation
- Vexatious litigation
