= 2012 shootings of St. John the Baptist Parish police officers =

Mass shooting in Louisiana, U.S.

- Location: St. John the Baptist Parish, Louisiana, United States
- Date: August 16, 2012
- Attack type: Murder and mass shooting
- Weapon: AK-47 assault rifle
- Deaths: Brandon Nielsen, 34; Jeremy Triche, 27
- Injuries: Michael Boyington, 33; Jason Triche, 30
- Perpetrators: Kyle David Joekel; Brian Lyn Smith
- Verdict: Guilty
- Convictions: Kyle Joekel; First-degree murder (x2); Brian Smith; None (mentally incompetent to stand trial)
- Sentence: Death – Kyle Joekel

On August 16, 2012, at St. John the Baptist Parish, Louisiana, a group of self-proclaimed sovereign citizens carried out a mass shooting targeting four sheriff's deputies. The attack claimed the lives of 34-year-old Brandon Joseph Nielsen (September 14, 1977 – August 16, 2012) and 27-year-old Jeremy Michael Triche (August 20, 1984 – August 16, 2012), while the other two deputies sustained injuries.

Authorities arrested seven suspects in connection with the shooting. Among them, three individuals — Kyle David Joekel (born January 1, 1985) and the father-son duo, Terry Lyn Smith and Brian Lyn Smith — were identified as the primary perpetrators, with Joekel and Brian Smith being the shooters responsible for the killings. Joekel and Brian Smith were charged with first-degree murder and faced the death penalty, while Terry Smith was charged with attempted first-degree murder. The rest were either released or convicted of lesser charges.

Terry Smith was later sentenced to life imprisonment for an unrelated rape case. Brian Smith was deemed mentally incompetent to stand trial and thus detained in a medical facility, while Joekel was found guilty of first-degree murder on both counts, and sentenced to death.

== Murders ==
On August 16, 2012, a mass shooting perpetrated by a group of extremists resulted in the deaths of two police officers in St. John the Baptist Parish, Louisiana.

On that morning, Sheriff's Deputy Michael Scott Boyington was shot four times with high-velocity rounds while conducting an off-duty security detail at a parking lot used by contractors near a refinery. The man responsible for Boyington's shooting, 44-year-old Terry Lyn Smith, who lived in a trailer park in LaPlace with his family, consisting of his 37-year-old second wife Chanel Skains, his 24-year-old older son Brian Lyn Smith and his 22-year-old younger son Derrick Smith. Apart from his wife and two sons, three more individuals: 27-year-old Kyle David Joekel, Brian's 23-year-old girlfriend Britney Keith and a 21-year-old woman named Teniecha Bright, were present in the trailer park.

In response to the shooting of Boyington, a team of four deputies approached the trailer park after they tracked reports of a speeding vehicle. While they were questioning Joekel and pinned him to the ground after cuffing him, Brian, who was said to be a paranoid schizophrenic, brandished an AK-47 style rifle and fired multiple shots at the deputies. Joekel himself also joined in the shooting after he got out of his cuffs. The shooting resulted in the deaths of two deputies, 27-year-old Jeremy Michael Triche and 34-year-old Brandon Joseph Nielsen, and a third deputy named Jason Triche (unrelated to Jeremy Triche) was wounded. The fourth and final deputy, Anthony Bullock, was not hurt. Subsequently, the two shooters, Joekel and Brian, were injured from a subsequent gunfight after the police fired back. The pair were taken to hospital for treatment while the remaining five were taken into custody as suspected accessories to the shooting.

The two wounded deputies, 33-year-old Michael Scott Boyington and 30-year-old Jason Triche (unrelated to Jeremy Triche), were taken to River Parishes Hospital for treatment and survived their injuries, and both were eventually discharged within three months after their hospitalization. However, the pair were left with permanent disabilities as a result of the shooting.

Preliminary investigations revealed that some, if not all, members of the Smith family and Joekel were alleged extremists connected to the sovereign citizen movement, an ideology classified by the FBI as domestic terrorism due to their beliefs that the government have no jurisdiction over them. Notably, Terry harbored a deep distrust in government, which he passed on to his two sons, and even refused to carry a driver's license. Apart from this, Joekel, a native of Nebraska, was a wanted fugitive sought after by the Nebraska and Kansas authorities for drug and resisting arrest charges, as well as making terrorist threats toward a person and toward law officers at a local bar in Gage County in August 2011.

== Pre-trial developments ==
=== Charges ===
After their arrests, Kyle Joekel, Teniecha Bright and the Smith family were all charged with attempted first-degree murder and accessory to attempted first-degree murder.

On August 24, 2012, both Brian and Joekel were charged with first-degree murder, an offense that warrants the death penalty under Louisiana state law. The prosecution planned to seek the death penalty for both Joekel and Brian.

On August 25, 2012, a grand jury formally indicted both Brian and Joekel for first-degree murder, while Britney Keith was indicted for principal to first-degree murder. It was speculated that Joekel and Brian would go on trial for murder earliest by 2014.

In February 2015, it was reported that Terry Smith had tried to escape from prison, but this attempt failed after a fellow prisoner alerted prison staff of Terry's plans.

=== Bright's release and convictions of Keith, Skains and Derrick Smith ===
By November 2012, the charges against Bright were dropped after she told police that she was only catching a ride home with the Smiths at the time when the shootings occurred. Chanel Skains, the wife of Terry, pleaded guilty to being an accessory to the shootings and agreed to cooperate as a prosecution witness; a witness testified that Skains had tried to intervene during the shootings and even attempted to save one of the deputies at the time of the shooting.

Similarly, Britney Keith pleaded guilty to being an accessory in April 2013 and likewise agreed to testify against the main offenders. She was sentenced in 2022 to concurrent sentences of five years' jail for each of the charges she was found guilty of.

Derrick was convicted in May 2013 after pleading guilty as an accessory, and he was sentenced to five years' jail for the offense, plus 12 years for the other charge of being a felon in possession of a firearm. Despite concerns of his alleged links to extremist groups, Derrick was released in April 2017 after he completed less than half of his sentence with good behaviour. However, four months later, Derrick was re-arrested for illegal possession of weapons.

=== Rape trial of Terry Smith ===
Terry, who still faced charges of attempted first-degree murder in connection to the shootings, was brought to trial for raping his stepdaughter over a period of seven years from 2004 to 2011, and local prosecutors charged him with a total of two counts of aggravated rape, three counts of aggravated incest and one count of sexual battery.

On January 28, 2016, Terry, then 48 years old, was found guilty of all charges by a 12-member jury through a unanimous decision. On March 21, 2016, Judge Randall Bethancourt sentenced Terry to two mandatory life sentences without the possibility of parole for the most serious charges of aggravated rape, plus another 95 years' jail for the remaining charges.

After his sentencing, Terry filed an appeal against his rape conviction in January 2017, but the Louisiana 1st Circuit Court of Appeal dismissed his appeal and upheld his life sentences and convictions on February 17, 2017.

== Murder trials ==
=== Pre-trial motions ===
In August 2013, both Brian Smith and Kyle Joekel filed motions to avoid the death penalty. Brian asked to have the death penalty taken off the table on the grounds of severe mental illnesses, while Joekel asked to overturn his indictment for first-degree murder.

In September 2013, the pair returned to court to argue their cases, with Joekel's counsel submitting that the indictment against Joekel should be downgraded to second-degree murder (which was punishable by life imprisonment) as the indictment did not specify the aggravating circumstances to qualify it as a death penalty case, and Brian's lawyers citing testimony from his stepmother about his psychiatric condition. During that same month, Judge J. Sterling Snowdy denied Joekel's request to overturn his indictment.

=== Relocation of trial venue ===
In March 2017, 40th Judicial District Court Judge J. Sterling Snowdy approved a 2014 application by Brian's lawyers to move the trial venue from St. John the Baptist Parish to another venue, due to the publicity of the case and the need to ensure a fair and impartial trial.

In November 2017, Judge Snowdy decided to move the trial location of Brian Smith's trial to the St. Martin Parish. Similarly, Kyle Joekel, the other shooter, would have his trial venue moved even though he would be tried separately.

=== Brian Smith ===
In March 2018, Brian's new trial date was fixed on October 22, 2018, after the original trial date in February 2018 was postponed.

By 2020, Brian was detained at a mental hospital after psychiatric experts deemed him mentally incompetent to stand trial for first-degree murder. As a result of this ruling, Kyle Joekel was the sole shooter of the pair to be put on trial and condemned to death row for murdering Jeremy Triche and Brandon Nielsen.

=== Kyle Joekel ===
Conviction

Less than eight years after the double murder and several delays, the murder trial of Kyle Joekel began on February 1, 2020.

During the trial, it was the prosecution's case that Joekel had actively participated in the shooting of the deputies and the most notable aspect of the case was, Joekel had armed himself with an AK-47 assault rifle and shot one of the murder victims, Deputy Brendon Nielsen, to death while the deputy was injured and had fallen on the ground, and even shot Triche. DNA evidence revealed that Joekel's blood was on the rifle, and his pants were also covered with blood matching the DNA profile of Nielsen. The defense, however, denied that Joekel participated in the shootings and claimed that the sole shooter was Brian Smith, who was still detained without trial at a mental facility, even though they agreed that Joekel was at the scene of crime when the shooting occurred, and they also argued that the prosecution failed to prove that Joekel fired a shot at the time of the shooting, and also pointed to the inconsistency in the testimonies of the prosecution witnesses. The two surviving deputies, Jason Triche and Michael Scott Boyington, as well as Terry Smith's wife Chanel Skains, were among the witnesses who testified for the prosecution. Joekel elected to enter his defense and took the stand, and he testified that he was innocent of the crime and never fired a shot, insisting that he was merely a bystander and pinned the blame on Brian.

On February 7, 2020, the jury found Joekel guilty of first-degree murder on both counts after deliberating the case for less than 30 minutes.

Sentencing

After his conviction, the sentencing trial of Joekel began the next day on February 8, 2020. The prosecution sought the death penalty for Joekel, stating that the families of Jeremy Triche and Brandon Nielsen had suffered great pain and devastation from the loss of their loved ones, and also cited the magnitude of Joekel's actions and impact on the lives of those affected by the shooting. The family members of the deceased deputies also testified that the victims were good fathers and husbands and how much their actions and deaths impacted their lives. On the other hand, Joekel's defense counsel urged the jury to sentence Joekel to life without parole, stating that their client, who grew up in rural Nebraska on his grandfather's farm, had a tragic upbringing marred by poverty, isolation, and a troubled family life. Joekel was said to have left school in 11th grade after a conflict with his father, who was a minister who was forced by financial hardship to travel around the country for preaching professions, and he became an alcoholic in high school, which was a common phenomenon in his community, and his family could not afford heating in their home due to their poverty.

On February 9, 2020, the jury returned with their verdict on sentence, unanimously recommending the death penalty for Joekel after about 30 minutes of deliberation. State prosecutor William Dieters reportedly described in his closing statement that Joekel had caused "total chaos and hell" for murdering the two victims in cold blood and it was unfair for him to seek mercy, in contrast to the defense's attempt to portray Joekel as someone who followed along with the Smith family's radical beliefs. The families of Triche and Nielsen responded in the aftermath that the death penalty was the only appropriate justice in this case.

On February 10, 2023, three years after the jury delivered their verdict of death, 39-year-old Kyle David Joekel was formally sentenced to death by Judge J. Sterling Snowdy. The sentencing came after several delays caused by the COVID-19 pandemic in the United States and an extensive motion filed by Joekel's lawyers for a new trial. Joekel's lawyers expressed their intention to appeal against the death sentence.

== Current status of Joekel ==
After he was sentenced to death, Kyle Joekel was transferred to the Louisiana State Penitentiary, where he was incarcerated on death row since his sentencing in 2023; a total of 57 inmates, including Joekel, were held on death row that year.

In 2023, the same year Joekel was sentenced to death, Louisiana Governor John Bel Edwards, nearing the end of his term, publicly expressed his opposition to the death penalty and called for its repeal. Despite his advocacy, the Louisiana legislature voted on May 24, 2023, to reject a bill that would have abolished capital punishment in the state. The following month, in June, 55 of Louisiana's 56 death row inmates — including Joekel — submitted clemency petitions, hoping Edwards would commute their sentences to life imprisonment before leaving office. These requests were reviewed by the Louisiana Board of Pardons and Committee on Parole.

However, in July 2023, the Board denied all 56 petitions, ruling the inmates were ineligible due to filing too soon after recent court decisions — clemency requests must come at least a year after a final appeal ruling. In October 2023, the Board also rejected additional clemency pleas from five more death row inmates, including Antoinette Frank.

On March 18, 2025, the state of Louisiana conducted the execution of convicted rapist-murderer Jessie Hoffman Jr. by nitrogen hypoxia, bringing an end to the state's 15-year moratorium on executions due to the state's shortage of lethal injection drugs and inability to procure them. As of March 17, 2025, the eve of Hoffman's execution, Joekel was one of 56 prisoners to remain on Louisiana's death row; the number fell to 55 after Hoffman's death sentence was carried out.

== Aftermath ==
Within the following week after the shootings, memorial services were conducted for both the fallen deputies. The first funeral and memorial mass was held for Jeremy Triche, who was four days short of becoming 28 when he died. Triche was buried on August 20, 2012, the date of his 28th birthday, while Brandon Nielsen's funeral was scheduled for two days from August 21 to August 22, 2012, with many officers from across the state attending his funeral. Nielsen was survived by his wife and five children while Triche left behind a wife and two-year-old son.

Over the next few years after the shooting, both the widows of Nielsen and Triche gradually became close friends due to them losing their husbands to the same tragedy. The families of the victims and the community of St. John the Baptist Parish also continued to conduct memorial ceremonies to commemorate the two deceased deputies.

Jason Triche, one of the survivors of the shooting, resumed his work as a police officer in 2017 after accepting a kidney transplant, and was assigned to the information technology department at the Sheriff's Office.

== See also ==
- Capital punishment in Louisiana
- List of death row inmates in the United States § Louisiana
- List of mass shootings in the United States
