= Guylaine Lanctôt =

Canadian physician and anti-vaccination activist (1941–2025)

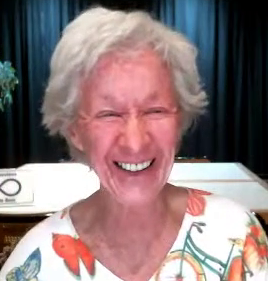
- Lanctôt in 2022
- Born: 1941
- Died: 4 May 2025 (aged 83)
- Other names: Ghislaine Lanctôt; Ghislaine Saint-Pierre Lanctôt; Diesse Ghis
- Occupation: Author
- Notable work: La mafia médicale
- Movement: Anti-vaccination; HIV/AIDS denialism Sovereign citizens

Ghis (born Guylaine Lanctôt; 1941 – 4 May 2025) was a Canadian phlebologist who was barred from practising medicine in 1996. A major figure of the anti-vaccination movement in Quebec and France from the 1990s onwards, she was also an AIDS denialist and a sovereign citizen ideologue.

== Youth ==
Lanctôt was born in 1941. She grew up in a well-to-do family of eight children in Beloeil, Quebec. Her father Jean Lanctôt was the co-owner of a pharmacy with his wife Fernande Saint-Pierre, and president of a small pharmaceutical company. Jean's father was also a pharmacist and one of the founders of a pharmacy school that would become the Faculty of Pharmacy at the Université de Montréal.

At the age of 14, Lanctôt was expelled from college, owing to her disruptive behaviour and lack of interest in classwork. Freed from her school obligations, she worked as a secretary and horse riding instructor. She enrolled into the Collège français after two years out of school and pursued studies in medicine in Paris and Montreal. Lanctôt married a physician with whom she had four children; the marriage ended in 1978.

== Phlebitis clinics ==
Starting in 1969, Lanctôt practised phlebology in clinics she co-owned with her husband and other partners, expanding their chain to eight clinics in Quebec and Ontario. She greatly contributed to promote phlebology in Quebec, through interviews and columns in the media. She sold her ownership in the clinics when divorced in 1978, then opened others with new partners, in Montreal, Laval, Toronto and Florida.

With her sister Henriette, she founded the Bottin des femmes in 1981, which would soon develop into Quebec's businesswomen's association.

During the 1980s, Lanctôt owned several cosmetic medicine clinics in Canada and the United States. She moved to Florida in 1984 and concentrated her efforts on the American market, as the Quebec public health insurance program delisted cosmetic phlebology treatments. During that period, she worked entirely on promoting the clinics, her partners seeing the patients. She sold her clinics in 1994, as other entrepreneurs imitated her business model centred around high-volume cosmetic care services.

She said she discovered the anti-vaccination movement during a conference showcasing promoters of alternative treatments and conspiracists held in a venue adjacent to the 1992 8th International AIDS Conference in Amsterdam. She adopted Peter Duesberg's pseudoscientific AIDS theories in the same period.

== La mafia médicale and the anti-vaccination movement ==
Her 1994 book La mafia médicale, published in English under the name The medical Mafia: How to get out of it alive and take back our health & wealth, had a significant impact on public opinion and positioned her in the vanguard of the anti-vaccination movement in the French-speaking world. The book led the best-seller list for weeks when it was published. A total of 35,000 copies were initially sold in Quebec alone.

Produced by her own publishing house, the book alleged the existence of a vast conspiracy involving the medical and pharmaceutical professions, as well as financial and political interests. The text is punctuated with spiritual beliefs relating to human health based on new age culture rather than medical knowledge. It argues cancer is a benefit and that vaccines threaten the continued existence of the human species.

Lanctôt indicated she developed her mistrust of the medical profession and pharmaceutical industries from her recollection of her father's struggle with government regulations which curtailed the profitability of small drugstore chains like his.

Her popularity buoyed by the news coverage generated by La mafia médicale, Lanctôt became a standard bearer of the anti-vaccination movement and tax resistance.

In 1995, Lanctôt refused to voluntarily quit medicine, as the Quebec College of Physicians requested. A complaint was filed with the college's disciplinary committee for advising parents not to vaccinate her children in her capacity as a physician, through her book and in media interviews. The committee's hearings, starting in July 1995, were covered by the news media and attended by rowdy groups of Lanctôt's supporters. She called as witnesses several anti-vaccination activists, including Viera Scheibner. She announced her resignation from the College of Physicians in September 1996. Pursuing the matter in absentia, the disciplinary committee found Lanctôt "prefers not to respect the most elementary rules of ethics and acts accordingly to the fantasies of her imagination", handing her a rare lifetime ban in 1997. Lanctôt declared bankruptcy as those proceedings were under way, despite selling her American clinics to her associates for a sum of $650,000 as well as her clinics in Montreal, Laval and Toronto.

== Sovereign citizen movement ==
At the time of her suspension, Lanctôt had already stopped practising medicine and offered workshops on principles in line with the sovereign citizen movement, advising people to cut ties with the government. She claimed she no longer had a bank account, credit card, or public health insurance and that she stopped filing tax returns. Her philosophy had been linked both to New Age spiritualism and to the sovereign citizen movement that had been developing in the United States in the 1970s. As early as 1995, she gave talks predicting the coming of an ideal society following governmental collapse.

In 2001, Lanctôt spoke out against a province-wide vaccination campaign against meningitis, decrying the vaccine as "a biological weapon testing tool" and repeating her belief that all diseases have psychic causes. She then went by the name Ghislaine Saint-Pierre Lanctôt and lived in Stukely-Sud.

Faced with her refusal to file tax returns since 1995, after repeated warnings a court order was issued against Lanctôt in September 2008, leading to her arrest by the Royal Canadian Mounted Police. She turned down a conditional release agreement and was incarcerated for two months and thereafter fined $1,000. Throughout the proceedings, she refused to recognize the legitimacy of the courts.

During the COVID-19 pandemic, she argued the public health emergency was "a lie" during speaking engagements and social media interviews.

Canadian singer Bernard Lachance kept up a sustained correspondence with Lanctôt during the period when he became a conspiracy theorist in regard to AIDS. Lachance discontinued his tritherapy treatments and died from bacterial sepsis on 11 March 2021.

== Death ==
Lanctôt died on 4 May 2025, a few weeks before her 84th birthday, after having recently undergone surgery and then also having refused all diagnostic tests and further treatment.

== Publications ==
- Lanctôt, Guylaine (1988). De belles jambes à tout âge [Beautiful Legs at Any Age] (in French). Éditions de l'Homme. ISBN 9782761907439.
- Lanctôt, Guylaine (1 January 1995). The medical Mafia: How to get out of it alive and take back our health & wealth. Here's The Key Inc. ISBN 978-0964412606.
- Guis, Diesse (2001). Que diable suis-je venue faire sur cette Terre ? M'accomplir ! [What the Hell am I Doing on this Earth? Fulfillment!] (in French) (2nd ed.). Self-published. ISBN 9782980698705.
