= Romana Didulo =

Filipina-Canadian conspiracy theorist (born 1974)

- Born: November 1974 (age 51–52); Naga City, Philippines
- Known for: Conspiracy theories; Pretender
- Political party: Canada 1st Party (2020–2023)

Romana Didulo (/roʊˈmɑːnə dɪˈduːloʊ/ roh-MAH-nuh dih-DOO-loh, /rə-/ ruh-'; born November 1974) is a Filipina conspiracy theorist who moved to Canada in 1990. One of the most prominent figures of the QAnon movement in Canada, she promotes other conspiracy theories such as pseudolegal concepts derived from the sovereign citizen movement. Didulo came to prominence as a pretender who proclaimed herself to be the "Queen of Canada", and later, "Queen of the World". She had a group of followers who travel with her, resulting in confrontations with local residents.

She has been identified as one of the most dangerous QAnon influencers in Canada by researchers following the movement, given her frequent calls for violent action, her proven ability to incite her followers to take concrete actions on her behalf, and her continuous attempts to establish a competing government to the internationally recognized one in Ottawa.

== Early life, family and education ==
According to Didulo, she was born in November 1974, in the Philippines, the younger of two children. Her parents were lawyer and engineer Romualdo Didulo and Ana Didulo. According to Didulo's profile on Canada 1st Party's website, her grandmother was an educator who fought against Japan during World War II. She later said that her grandmother had fought the Chinese occupiers during the war, contradicting her earlier claims and the fact that the Philippines were occupied by Japan and not China. According to Didulo's accounts, both her parents died when she was young: her father died when she was age 10, and her mother died within a year of that, resulting in her being raised by her school teacher aunt Winnie Freda Didulo Delfín and grandparents.

The Canada 1st Party's website stated that on July 25, 1990, the 15-year-old Didulo emigrated from the Philippines to Vancouver, Canada, although other sources indicate she first went to the United States with her uncle. City of Vancouver meeting minutes from 1999 mention Didulo as member of a "Children and Youth Population Health Advisory Committee" of the Vancouver-Richmond Health Board.

== Career ==
Beginning in the 2000s, Didulo started several business ventures. In 2006, she was the owner-operator of Global Solutions Canada, a recruitment company that specialized in helping Canadian firms hire foreign skilled workers in the oil sands, gas and mining sectors; the Better Business Bureau has 24 Hours Care Inc. as an alternate name for the business. She also set up a healthcare consultancy. None of Didulo's business endeavours seem to have been successful. She said in one of her livestreams that she was homeless at some point, and slept on the floor in her friend's nail salon. Come 2021, she was living in Victoria and working for a school offering courses in English as a second language.

== Conspiracy theorism ==
Didulo eventually became immersed in online conspiracy theories. In 2020, she reemerged as the founder and leader of the non-registered political party "Canada 1st Party" with the slogan "draining the swamp in Ottawa!" She began creating video interventions, during which her public persona experienced a series of rapid transformations. She claimed to be everything from a political party leader to the head of state of a Canadian republic, and even the Queen of Canada with high-level extraterrestrial connections. She gained followers in 2021 after being endorsed by popular QAnon influencers. She claims her power is backed up by a secret faction within the American military, a common QAnon trope. According to Vice News reporter Mack Lamoureux, Didulo's rise in popularity among QAnon adherents was made possible by the fact that "Q", the movement's originator, went silent in late 2020: this allowed Didulo to "[step] into the power vacuum".

Although Didulo did not at first explain the basis for her claim to be the Canadian monarch, she later clarified that she had been "appointed" to that position by David J. Carlson, an American conspiracy theorist who claims to be "Commander-In-Chief" and "King" of the United States. Didulo claims that Carlson appointed her after she led in 2017 a mission against the Chinese communist military, who were allegedly occupying Canada in underground tunnels, producing adrenochrome, trafficking humans, and planning to start World War III by attacking the US. According to Didulo, her position as Queen of Canada was also "confirm[ed]" by a QAnon conspiracy theorist known under the pseudonym "WhipLash347".

Didulo gained notoriety during the COVID-19 pandemic by demanding that all COVID-19 vaccines be destroyed and promoting various conspiracy theories common to the QAnon narrative. In response to her exhortations, some of her followers expressed the desire to violently attack health care professionals and public officials. Her rhetoric appeared to become less violent throughout 2022; however, in early 2023, she called on her followers to fire on groups of migrants at the Canada–U.S. border.

Researchers point out that like other online influencers mixing spirituality and conspiracies, Didulo took advantage of a weakening of traditional institutions during the pandemic to attract people looking for unorthodox worldviews. However, Didulo has not been universally adopted within the QAnon movement, with some influencers warning she might be a government operative tasked with discrediting the movement. She responds by threatening her detractors with execution. She joined the 2022 convoy protest in Ottawa, where she was met with a hostile reaction when she attempted to burn a Canadian flag, prompting her to denounce the demonstrators she intended to join. In 2022, David J. Carlson, whom Didulo claims appointed her as Queen of Canada, ended their partnership by denouncing Didulo's behavior and endorsing a former follower of Didulo claiming to be the true Canadian queen. Didulo responded by suggesting that the person posing online as Carlson may be a clone. She also attracted followers abroad, and appointed herself several "Kings" and "Queens" in countries such as Australia, New Zealand, Austria, Germany, the United Kingdom, Switzerland, Hungary and Vietnam.

Didulo has made a number of unsubstantiated claims, including that she is an extraterrestrial with access to secret, New Age healing technology that can regrow limbs, that she has abolished utility bills or other debts, and has ended adrenochrome extraction in Canada.

To effectuate these claims, Didulo has issued a number of what she calls "decrees" supposedly outlawing various actions by governments and financial institutions. She urges her followers to use pseudo-legal documents using language developed by the sovereign citizen movement to avoid paying debts or to pressure businesses into dropping public health measures. A large number of businesses, schools, and others received "cease and desist" documents. Several creditors have taken legal actions against her followers, in several cases leaving them at risk of losing their homes. Christine Sarteschi, an academic studying extremist movements, has been tracking cases trickling through the court system where creditors have foreclosure actions enforced against Didulo followers who stop making their mortgage or utilities payments.

Didulo lived in British Columbia until 2022, when she began travelling through Canada with a small group of supporters, receiving significant donations to fund her tour. According to those who travelled with her, Didulo exhibits authoritarian and abusive behaviour toward members of her team, with experts such as Chatham University criminology professor Christine Sarteschi warning that this fits cult-like behaviour. Some volunteers who quit, or simply displeased her, were threatened with execution. Several of her former followers organized into a group that monitors her activities, warning communities she travels to.

In a ruling issued in August 2024, Court of King’s Bench of Alberta Associate Chief Justice Kenneth Nielsen stated that Didulo's followers contribute to an increasing number of cases implicating individuals invoking baseless pseudo-legal arguments in an attempt to evade their debts. Nielsen's Memorandum of Decision notes that attempts to invoke Didulo's decrees as a legal defence are invariably rejected by the courts, some defendants losing their homes.

Didulo started issuing her own money in March 2023. Referring to sovereign citizen rhetoric, she started handing out the pieces of paper representing unspecified currency to her close followers as a first step to a more general distribution. Several of her fans said they hoped to use the bills to pay for housing and other necessities, even though Didulo did not claim that would be possible. She nevertheless requested more donations to continue printing her currency, claiming it will make every Canadian rich in the future.

Donations from her followers fund Didulo's caravan, some making large monthly donations even while facing foreclosure. The number of people who were subscribing to Didulo's Telegram account varies, but was most commonly estimated at 60,000 or 70,000 in 2022. She regularly solicits donations through social media. In August 2022, these fundraising efforts included a video message presented as an endorsement and fundraising pitch from Roger Stone. Stone's lawyer intervened to deny his client had anything to do with Didulo, Stone himself warning his Telegram followers the campaign was "a scam".

In 2023, Didulo was living in a motorhome near Tatamagouche, Nova Scotia, before heading West with some of her supporters. In September 2023, after having been forced to leave Kamsack by citizens and RCMP officers, Didulo and about 15–25 supporters moved into a former school in Richmound, Saskatchewan, where they would stay for two years. Didulo initially responded to demonstrations against her presence in Richmound by allegedly threatening local officials through emails and social media posts. The RCMP indicated those allegations are under investigation. In November, they briefly relocated their vehicles to an uncultivated field 11 km (6.8 mi) from town after the Fire Chief attempted to investigate possible fire code violations at the school, but soon returned to the former school grounds. The owner of the defunct school was charged with assault after one of the protests against Didulo's presence in Richmound. He failed to show up in court and a warrant was issued for his arrest. The charge was stayed when a witness failed to appear at the November 21 Leader Circuit Court hearing but he was charged in July 2025 with assault, resisting arrest and uttering threats in another incident. The group occupied the school until forced to leave in early September 2025, when the Saskatchewan Health Authority declared the building unfit for human habitation and issued an order to vacate. The experience of Richmound residents with Didulo and her followers was the subject of an investigation published by CBC's Uncover podcast.

== Theosophy ==
In her persona as Queen of Canada, Didulo presents a spiritual worldview that borrows elements and symbolism from the theosophical movement of Helena Blavatsky and esoteric groups in the same lineage, such as Guy and Edna Ballard's I AM organization and Elizabeth Clare Prophet's Church Universal and Triumphant. Although Didulo never acknowledges these influences, religious studies researchers Carmen Celestini and Amarnath Amarasingam argue that "the parallels between her movement and those from the past are hard to conceive of as simply coincidental." Some of her followers appear to be aware of the esoteric filiation, as they sometimes use concepts promoted by those groups when discussing Didulo.

As with Didulo, the use of decrees was a central feature of the I AM movement, both as commands from the Ascended Masters and as a request from supplicants for the payments of bills and other blessings. The decrees were also used by the Church Universal and Triumphant, with a change of tone that anticipates some of Didulo's more belligerent utterances. Didulo's followers are urged to read her decrees every night and discuss their content among them.

The purple flame was a central symbol used by Guy and Edna Ballards, which were often called "twin flames", an expression Didulo sometimes uses in her messages. Her references to the etheric domain also appear to be borrowed from those spiritual leaders.

== Police issues ==
In November 2021, Didulo was briefly detained by officers of the Royal Canadian Mounted Police's Integrated National Security Enforcement Teams and subjected to a psychiatric evaluation after she called her followers to "shoot to kill" health care providers who vaccinate minors against COVID-19. According to Didulo, the RCMP also seized computer equipment. One of her followers was also arrested in Laval in relation to specific threats uttered on a Telegram channel associated with Didulo's group.

On August 13, 2022, a group of approximately 30 of Didulo's followers attempted to enter the headquarters of the Peterborough, Ontario police in an attempt to seize police officers in what they characterized as a citizen's arrest for "COVID crimes" (enforcing COVID-19 restrictions). Didulo herself did not participate aside from addressing the demonstration from a vehicle parked nearby. Despite her claims, no military forces appeared to help detain the police officers. The confrontation with officers resulted in six demonstrators being arrested. Didulo later attempted to distance herself from that incident by claiming during one of her livestreams that she had been present in Peterborough as "an observer" and not a participant. An investigation into claims made by a 55-year-old Didulo supporter that he was seriously injured during the arrest was closed in December 2022 after the complainant refused to provide evidence to the Special Investigations Unit.

The confrontation with the police force brought Didulo to the attention of the RCMP once again. On the morning of September 3, 2025, Didulo and 15 of her followers were arrested during an RCMP raid on the former Richmound school, as Didulo livestreamed the arrest. They were released on September 4 after the 13 weapons seized on the premises turned out to be inoffensive replicas, but Didulo and Manz were promptly detained thereafter when they violated their release conditions by communicating with each other. The Saskatchewan Health Authority declared the school buildings unfit for human habitation, forcing the group to relocate elsewhere. She was released on bail on September 8, 2025, and was back in court in Swift Current on September 17 to answer charges of breaching a court order and attempting to intimidate a justice system participant. The case was then scheduled for a preliminary hearing in March 2026. On March 18, 2026, it was announced that prosecutors had stayed both of the charges against Didulo, with no reason provided at the time of announcement. Speaking following the stay, Saskatchewan Justice Minister Tim McLeod said of the prosecutors decision "I understand that they have recently come to the conclusion that there's no longer a reasonable likelihood of conviction, so they're not proceeding".

== Continuing activities ==
With the Richmound school abandoned, the members of Didulo's group dispersed but some of them are still livestreaming regularly as of August 2026. Didulo herself has kept out of the public eye and seldom interacts with her followers.

== See also ==
- COVID-19 misinformation in Canada
- Freeman on the land movement – Pseudolegal theory and associated movement
- Self-proclaimed monarchy – Self-proclaimed role of power
- Timeline of incidents involving QAnon
