= Abuse of process =

Legal tort of misusing court processes unjustified by legal actions being taken

An abuse of process is the unjustified or unreasonable use of legal proceedings or process to further a cause of action by an applicant or plaintiff in an action. It is a claim made by the respondent or defendant that the other party is misusing or perverting regularly issued court process (civil or criminal) not justified by the underlying legal action. In common law it is classified as a tort distinct from the intentional tort of malicious prosecution. It is a tort that involves misuse of the public right of access to the courts. In the United States it may be described as a legal process being commenced to gain an unfair litigation advantage.

The elements of a valid cause of action for abuse of process in most common law jurisdictions are as follows: (1) the existence of an ulterior purpose or motive underlying the use of process, and (2) some act in the use of the legal process not proper in the regular prosecution of the proceedings. Abuse of process can be distinguished from malicious prosecution, in that abuse of process typically does not require proof of malice, lack of probable cause in procuring issuance of the process, or a termination favorable to the plaintiff, all of which are essential to a claim of malicious prosecution. Typically, the person who abuses process is interested only in accomplishing some improper purpose that is collateral to the proper object of the process and that offends justice, such as an unjustified arrest or an unfounded criminal prosecution. Subpoenas to testify, attachments of property, executions on property, garnishments, and other provisional remedies are among the types of "process" considered to be capable of abuse.

== Distinct from malicious prosecution ==
A cause of action for abuse of process is similar to the action for malicious prosecution in that both actions are based on and involve the improper use of the courts and legal systems. The primary difference between the two legal actions is that malicious prosecution concerns the malicious or wrongful commencement of an action, while, on the other hand, abuse of process concerns the improper use of the legal process after process has already been issued and a suit has commenced. In abuse of process, the legal process is misused for some purpose which is considered improper under the law. Thus technically, the service of process itself—in the form of a summons—could be considered abuse of process under the right circumstances, e.g. fraudulent or malicious manipulation of the process itself, but in malicious prosecution, the wrongful act is the actual filing of the suit itself for improper and malicious reasons. The three requirements of malice, lack of probable cause in the issuance of the process, and a termination of the prior proceeding favorable to the plaintiff, are essential elements for malicious prosecution. Most jurisdictions do not require any of these three elements in order to make out a prima facie case for abuse of process.

== See also ==
- Abuse of rights
- Barratry
- Frivolous litigation
- Gaming the system
- Paper terrorism
- Pseudolaw
- Sewer service
- SLAPP
- Spamigation
- Vexatious litigation
