= Paper terrorism =

Use of bogus legal documents as a method of harassment

"Paper terrorism" is a neologism referring to the use of false liens, frivolous lawsuits, bogus letters of credit, and other legal or pseudolegal documents lacking sound factual basis as a method of harassment against an opponent on a scale described as evocative of conventional armed terrorism. These methods are popular among some American anti-government groups and those associated with the redemption movement.

Mark Pitcavage of the Anti-Defamation League states that these methods were pioneered in the late 1970s by the Posse Comitatus, an American far-right social movement. Some victims of paper terrorism have been forced to declare bankruptcy. An article by the Southern Poverty Law Center states that another tactic is filing reports with the Internal Revenue Service falsely accusing their political enemies of having unreported income.

Such frivolous lawsuits also clog the court system making it more difficult to process other cases and including using challenges to the titles of property owned by government officials and others. Another method of paper terrorism is filing bankruptcy petitions against others in an effort to ruin their credit ratings.

In the late 1990s, the "Republic of Texas", a militia group claiming that Texas was legally independent, carried out what it called "a campaign of paper terrorism" using bogus land claims and bad checks to try to congest Texas courts.

== See also ==
- Abuse of process
- Chilling effect
- Freeman on the land movement
- Frivolous litigation
- Lawfare
- Pseudolaw
- Sovereign citizen movement
- Spamigation
- Strategic lawsuit against public participation ("SLAPP suits")
- Texas secession movements
- Vexatious litigation
