= False lien =

False document for granting confiscation of property of a debtor

A false lien is document that purports to describe a lien, but which has no legal basis, or which is based upon false, fictitious, or fraudulent statements or representations. In the United States, the filing of false liens has been used as a tool of harassment and revenge in "paper terrorism", often against government officials.

== Overview ==
When used maliciously, the filer falsely submits a lien against their target alleging that the target owes the filer some sum of money for services or goods not delivered. The lien is inexpensive and relatively easy to file but, for the target, requires significant time and lawyers fees to be dissolved by a court. The practice was pioneered by the Posse Comitatus.

== Example ==
In 1992, a resident of Seattle filed a false lien of US$62,399.78 against General Electric (GE) for unpaid wages which he claimed GE had owed him for work performed but had "given away" to the Internal Revenue Service without his permission. The wages had been garnished due to outstanding income taxes which he had refused to pay. He and his wife also filed false liens against President George H. W. Bush, US Senator Slade Gorton, the Attorney General of Washington, Jack Welch Jr. (the CEO of GE), four IRS agents and their spouses, and various other public officials and judges. They claimed the false liens against the public officials and IRS employees were justified because the latter had failed to help the plaintiffs and were not fulfilling their Oaths of Office. These false liens were only dissolved after years of legal battles which eventually resulted in the couple being barred from filing any further "nonconsensual lien or encumbrance" against federal employees.

== Countermeasures ==
As a result, the U.S. Congress has criminalized the filing of false liens, and the U.S. Sentencing Guidelines treat the filing of a false lien against a government official as equally serious as threatening the government officials of the United States. The Bureau of Prisons has responded by treating lien documents and personal information (such as Social Security Numbers) of federal agents, judges, etc. as contraband in federal prisons. Various U.S. states have been developing ways of combating false liens.
