= Wilhelminism =

Period between 1888 and 1918 in the history of German Empire

- 1888–1918
| Year of Three Kaisers | Weimar culture |
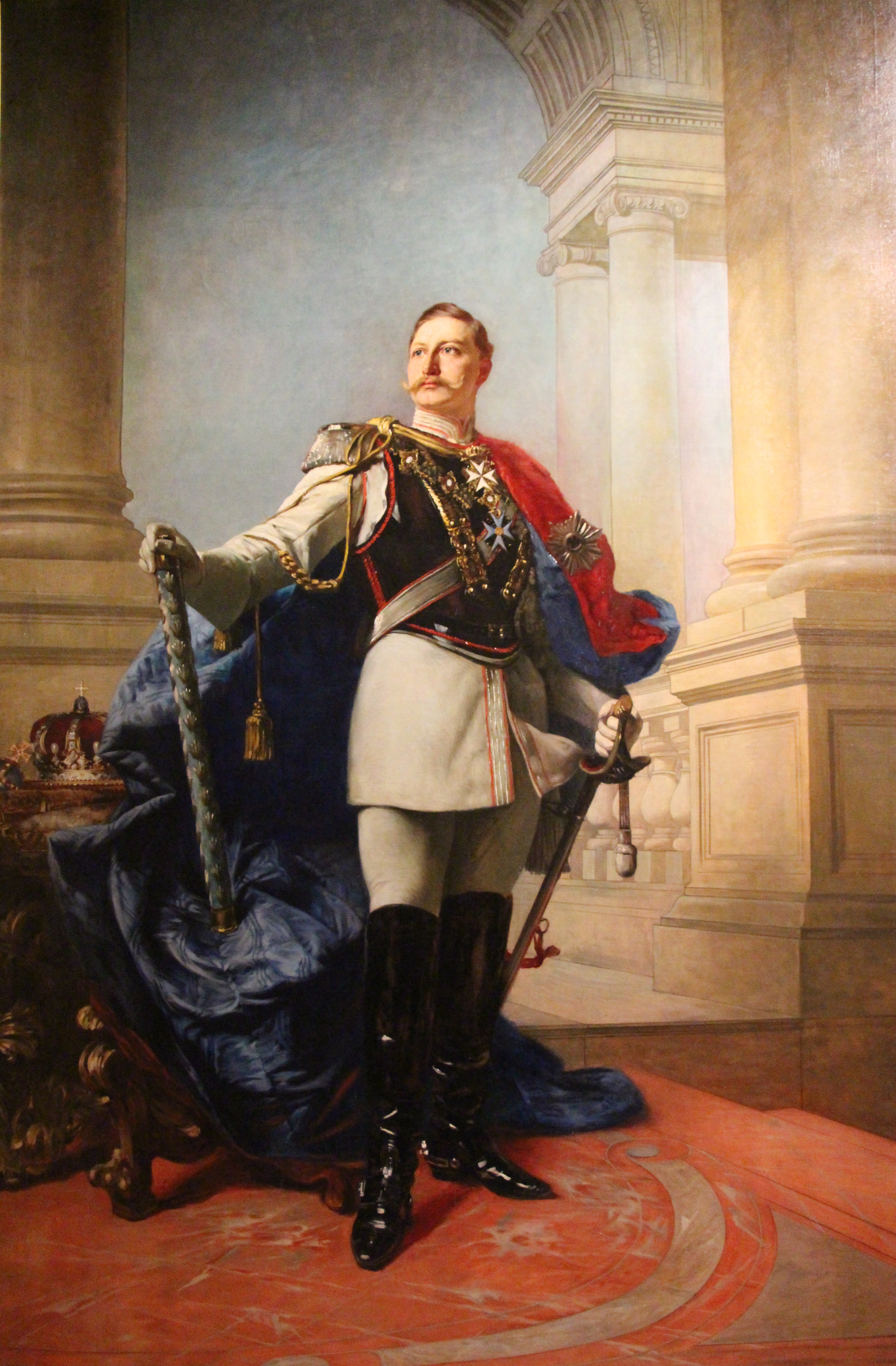
- Neo-Baroque painting of Wilhelm II, German Emperor by Max Koner, 1891
- Including: Gründerzeit
- Monarch: Wilhelm II

The Wilhelmine period or Wilhelmian era (German: Wilhelminische Zeit, Wilhelminische Epoche) comprises the period of German history between 1888 and 1918, embracing the reign of Kaiser Wilhelm II in the German Empire from the death of Kaiser Friedrich III until the end of World War I and Wilhelm's abdication during the November Revolution.

It represented an era of creative ferment in the society, politics, culture, art, literature, and architecture of Germany. It also roughly coincided with the late Victorian and Edwardian eras in the British Empire, the Gilded Age in the United States, the Belle Époque in the Third French Republic, and the Silver Age in the Russian Empire.

== Overview ==
The term "Wilhelminism" (Wilhelminismus) is not meant as a conception of society associated with the name Wilhelm and traceable to an intellectual initiative of the German Emperor. Rather, it relates to the image presented by Wilhelm II and his demeanour, as manifested by the public presentation of grandiose military parades and self-aggrandisement on his part. The latter tendency had already been noticed by his grandfather, Emperor Wilhelm I, while Wilhelm II's father, later Frederick III, was Crown Prince.

Wilhelminism also characterizes the social, literary, artistic, and cultural climate of Wilhelm II's reign, which on the one hand was dominated by the rigidly-conservative opinions of the Prussian Junker aristocracy, those associated with the German Agrarian League, and of the German industrialists, which closely mirrored those of the British upper class during the parallel Victorian era in the British Empire. Ironically, Germany during the Wilhelmian era was, on the other hand, distinguished by escalating secularization and growing belief in progress among intellectuals, in response to recent medical and scientific advances and the enormous prosperity of the heavily-industrialized German Empire, but which was at polar odds with the last Kaiser's belief in both Lutheranism and social conservatism. Even so, Otto von Bismarck's Anti-Socialist Laws were not renewed and the Iron Chancellor's efforts to renew them were the catalyst for his forced resignation at the last Kaiser's insistence.

The final break between the Iron Chancellor and the last Kaiser came when Bismarck initiated discussions with the opposition to form a new parliamentary majority without consulting with the monarch first. The Kartell, the shifting coalition government that Bismarck had been able to maintain since 1867, had finally lost its majority of seats in the Reichstag due to the Anti-Socialist Laws fiasco. The remaining powers in the Reichstag were the Catholic Centre Party and the Conservative Party.

In most parliamentary systems, the head of government depends upon the confidence of the parliamentary majority and has the right to form coalitions to maintain a majority of supporters. In a constitutional monarchy like the German Empire, however, the Chancellor or Prime Minister is required to meet regularly with the monarch to explain his or her policies and intentions within the Government. A Chancellor also could not afford to make an enemy of the monarch, who represented the only real separation of powers and check and balance against a Chancellor's otherwise absolute power. Moreover, a constitutional monarch has plenty of means at his or her disposal of quietly blocking an elected head of state's policy objectives and is one of the only people who can forcibly remove an overly ambitious Chancellor or Prime Minister from power. For these reasons, the last Kaiser believed that he had every right to be informed before Bismarck began coalition talks with the Opposition.

In a deeply ironic moment, a mere decade after expelling religious orders, banning Catholic schools, and demonizing all members of the Catholic Church in Germany as (German: Reichsfeinde, "traitors to the Empire") during the Kulturkampf, Bismarck decided to start coalition talks with the all-Catholic Centre Party. He invited that party's leader in the Reichstag, Baron Ludwig von Windthorst, to meet with him and began the negotiations by offering to overturn the 1872 Jesuit Law in return for the Centre Party's support. The last Kaiser always had a warm relationship with Baron von Windthorst, whose decades long defence of German Catholics, Poles, Jews, and other minorities against government overreach by the Iron Chancellor have since attracted very high praise and comparisons to Irish nationalist statesmen Daniel O'Connell and Charles Stewart Parnell, but Wilhelm was furious to hear about Bismarck's plans for coalition talks with the Centre Party only after they had already begun.

After a heated argument at Bismarck's estate over the latter's alleged disrespect for the Imperial Family, Wilhelm stormed out. Bismarck, forced for the first time in his career into a crisis that he could not twist to his own advantage, wrote a blistering letter of resignation, decrying the Monarchy's involvement in both foreign and domestic policy. The letter was published only after Bismarck's death.

In later years, Bismarck created the "Bismarck myth"; the view (which some historians have argued was confirmed by subsequent events) that Wilhelm II's successful demand for Bismarck's resignation destroyed any chance Imperial Germany ever had of stable government and international peace. According to this view, what Wilhelm termed "The New Course" is characterised as Germany's ship of state going dangerously off course, leading directly to the carnage of the First and Second World Wars.

According to Bismarck apologists, in foreign policy the Iron Chancellor had achieved a fragile balance of interests between Germany, France and Russia. Peace was allegedly at hand and Bismarck tried to keep it that way despite growing popular sentiment against Britain (regarding the German colonial empire) and especially against Russia. With Bismarck's dismissal, the Russians allegedly expected a reversal of policy in Berlin, so they quickly negotiated a military alliance with the Third French Republic, beginning a process that by 1914 largely isolated Germany.

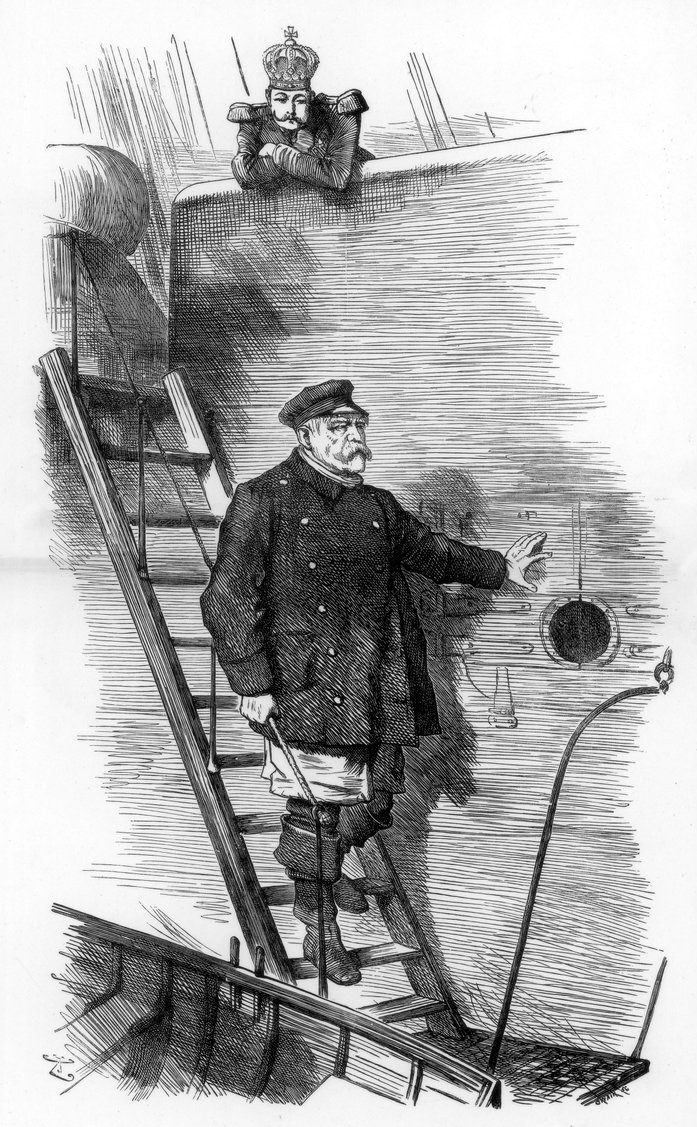
"Dropping the Pilot" by John Tenniel, published in Punch on 29 March 1890, two weeks after Bismarck's forced resignation as Chancellor

In contrast, historian Modris Eksteins has argued that Bismarck's dismissal was actually long overdue. According to Eksteins, the Iron Chancellor, in his need for a scapegoat, had demonized Classical Liberals in the 1860s, Roman Catholics in the 1870s, and Socialists in the 1880s with the highly successful and often repeated refrain, "The Reich is in danger." Therefore, in order to divide and rule, Bismarck ultimately left the German people even more divided in 1890 than they had ever been before 1871.

In interviews with C.L. Sulzberger for the book The Fall of Eagles, Prince Louis Ferdinand of Prussia, grandson and heir of Kaiser Wilhelm II, further commented, "Bismarck was certainly our greatest statesman, but he had very bad manners and he became increasingly overbearing with age. Frankly, I don't think his dismissal by my grandfather was a great tragedy. Russia was already on the other side because of the Berlin Congress of 1878. Had Bismarck stayed he would not have helped. He already wanted to abolish all the reforms that had been introduced. He was aspiring to establish a kind of Shogunate and hoped to treat our family in the same way the Japanese shoguns treated the Japanese emperors isolated in Kyoto. My grandfather had no choice but to dismiss him."

Subsequent Chancellor Bernhard von Bülow continued to implement legislation at the last Kaiser's insistence that favored industrial worker's rights to organized labor and collective bargaining, while still opposing Marxist ideas. Nevertheless, the German Social Democratic Party continued to expand its base and became the largest political party elected to the Reichstag during the 1912 national elections. Despite the party's stronger influence, internal developments were characterised, similarly to the Labour Party in Great Britain, by an increasing loyalty of the party leadership towards both the Monarchy and the German colonial empire. This attitude was condemned as "revisionism" by its opponents, but ultimately culminated in the Burgfrieden policy of agreeing to support the war effort during the patriotic euphoria later dubbed the Spirit of 1914. These developments, however, were closely mirrored by other Leftist parties in other nations.

== Architecture ==
While "Wilhelmism" is equally applied to the last Kaiser's favored styles in both the visual arts and architecture, such as the ornate Germania postage stamps, numerous government buildings and the Wilhelmine Ring housing areas of Berlin and many other German cities, the term is also used to describe an essentially-Neo-Baroque and prestige-oriented style of architecture. Similarly to the architecture of other European Capitols of the era, the Neo-Baroque was calculated to express Germany's ambitions to become and remain a naval, imperial, and colonial power.

This neo-Baroque style was particularly exemplified by the grandiose Siegesallee, a boulevard of what were intended to be heroic-looking marble statues of the last Kaiser's ancestors in the Tiergarten of Berlin.

Even though the Siegesallee was widely ridiculed by the infamously irreverent and sarcastic Berliners of the era as die Puppenallee, 'The Boulevard of Dolls' and as an alley where, "even the bird-shit is made of marble", the neo-Baroque statues received Royal Assent in Kaiser Wilhelm's Rinnsteinrede (German for 'gutter speech'), which was also a very harsh criticism of the recent birth of German modernist art which the last Kaiser considered degenerate art, at the formal unveiling of the Siegesallee on 18 December 1901.

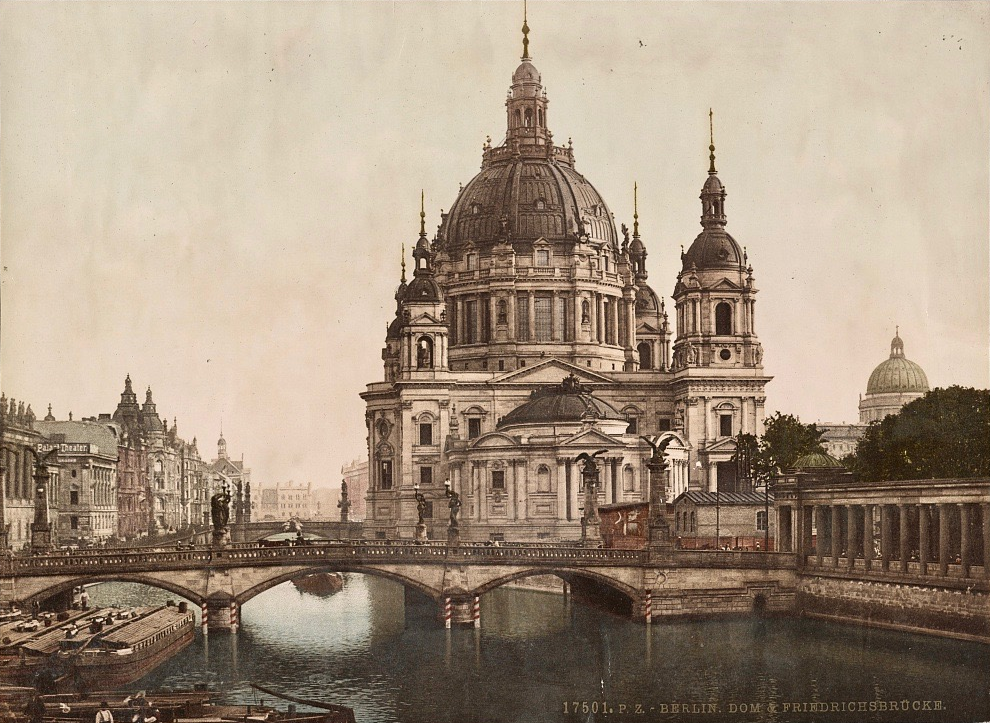
Berlin Cathedral

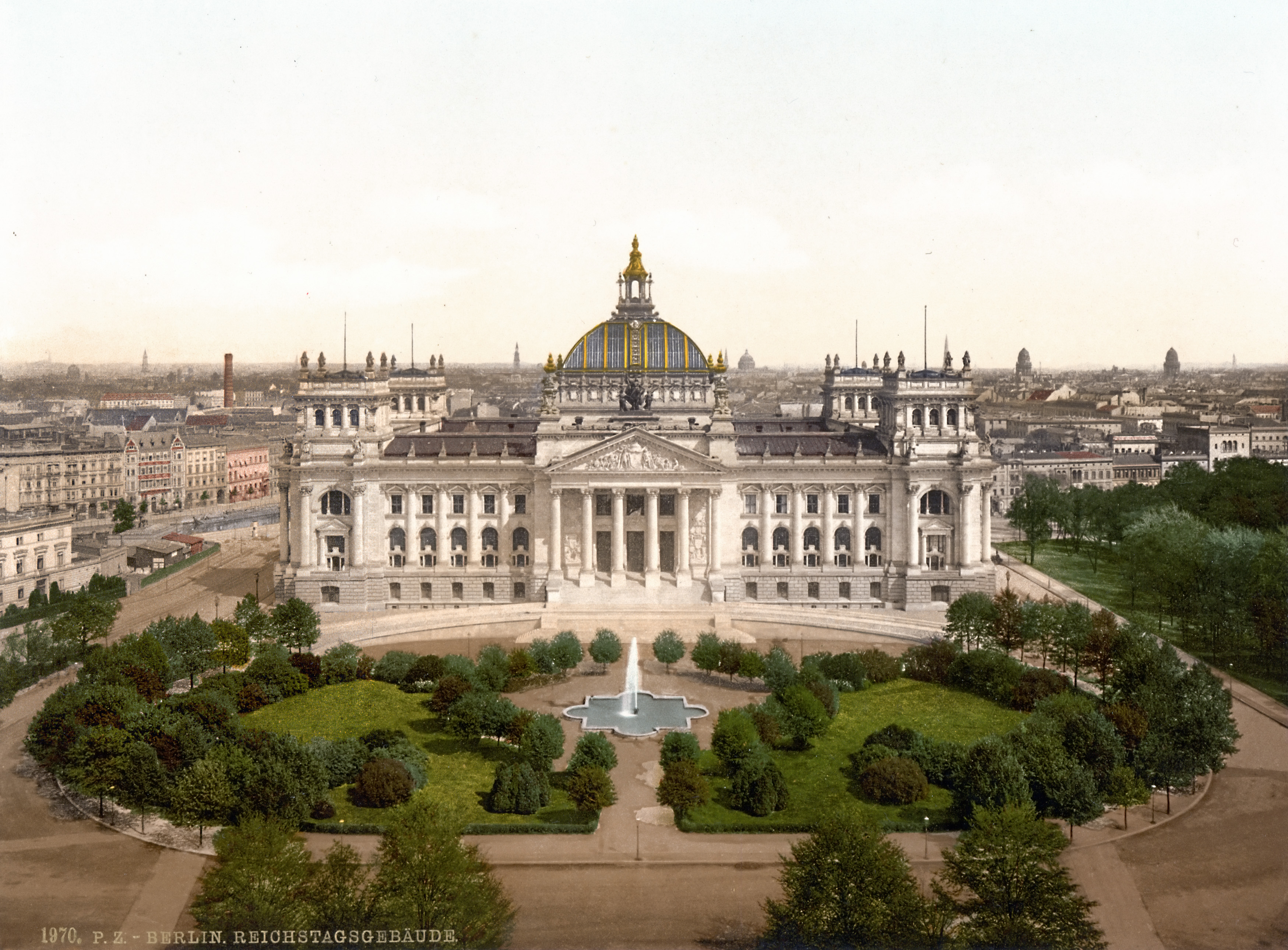
Reichstag building

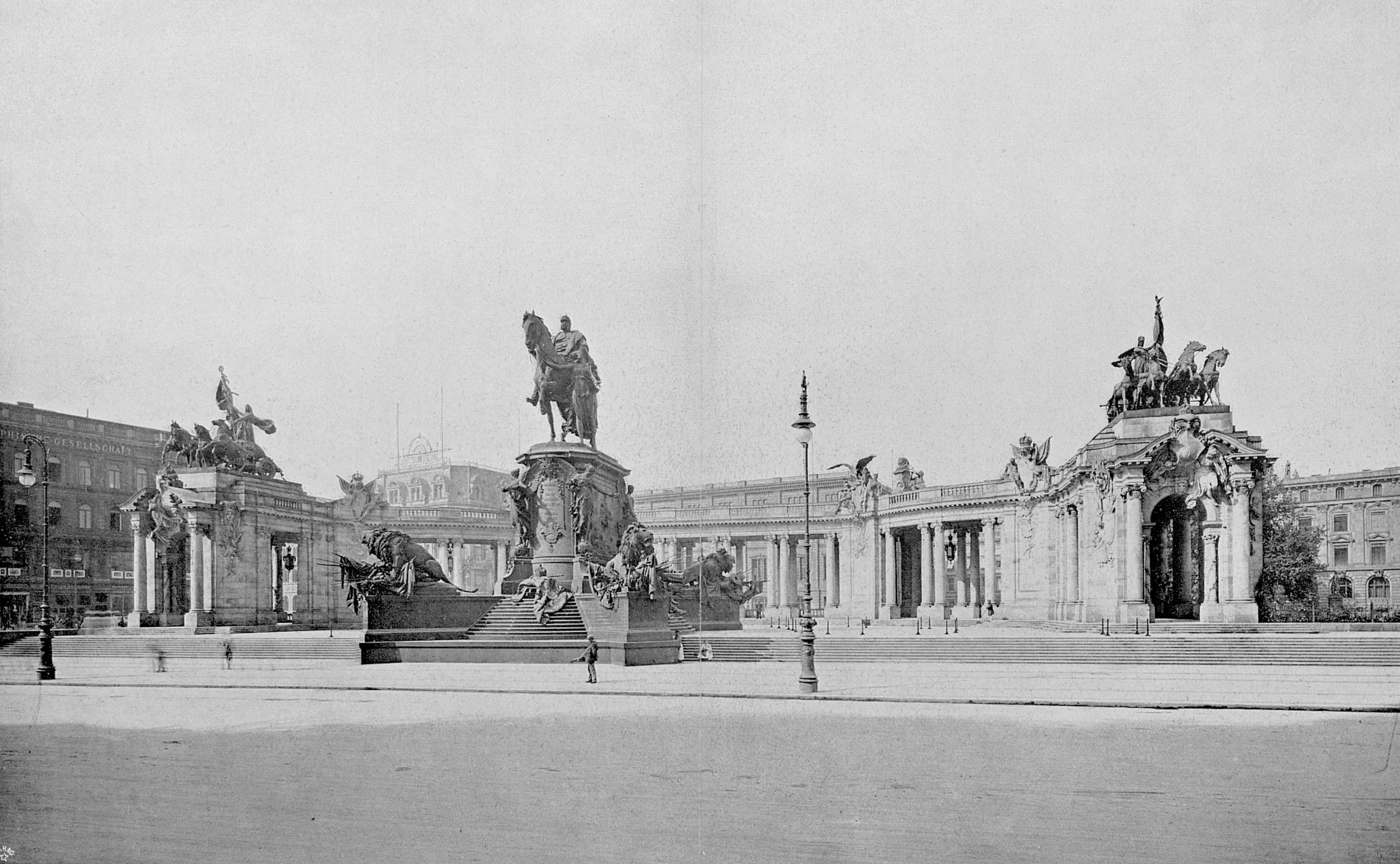
National Kaiser Wilhelm Monument

== Colonialism and militarism ==
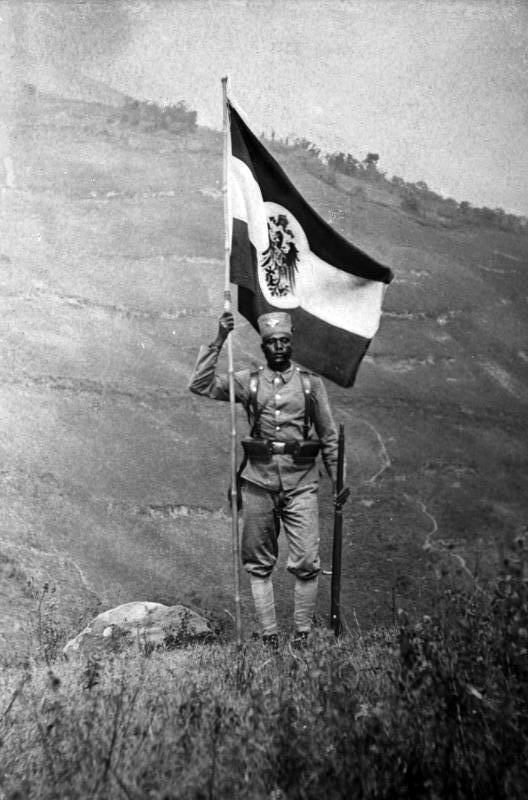
An East African Askari soldier holding the flag of the German colonial empire

Foreign policy was founded on Kaiser Wilhelm's support for both his Government's colonialist ambitions and their efforts to establish Germany as a world power (Weltmacht). The desire for a "place in the sun" as coined by Foreign Secretary Bernhard von Bülow and was shared by a large number of German citizens and intellectuals. Pan-Germanism achieved a short-lived high point after the German colonial empire expanded in Africa, China, New Guinea, and in the South Seas and became the third largest colonial empire after those of the United Kingdom and the Third French Republic. Meanwhile, European diplomatic relations deteriorated. In 1890, Germany refused to prolong the secret Reinsurance Treaty with the Russian Empire that had concluded by Bismarck in 1887, and Germany had to witness the forming of the Franco-Russian Alliance, which presenting a new threat of a two-front war.

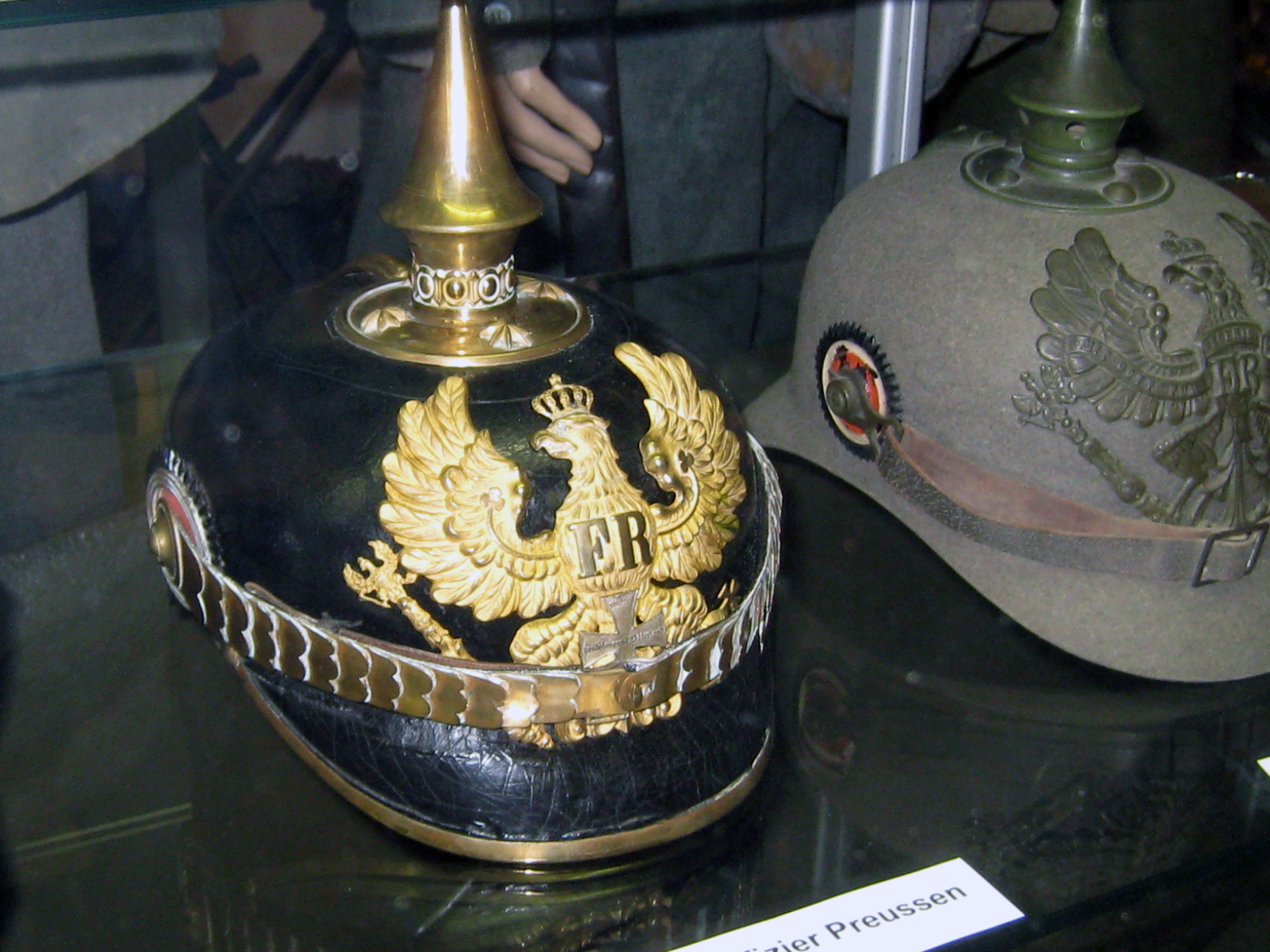
Prussian Pickelhauben

The distinctive spiked helmet, the so-called Pickelhaube had existed previously and not only in the German Empire, but it now symbolises Wilhelmian era and the Imperial German Army and Prussian Army-inspired militarism in general. (In fact, various sign languages still have the extended forefinger placed in front of the forehead, indicating the spiked helmet, as the sign for "German".)

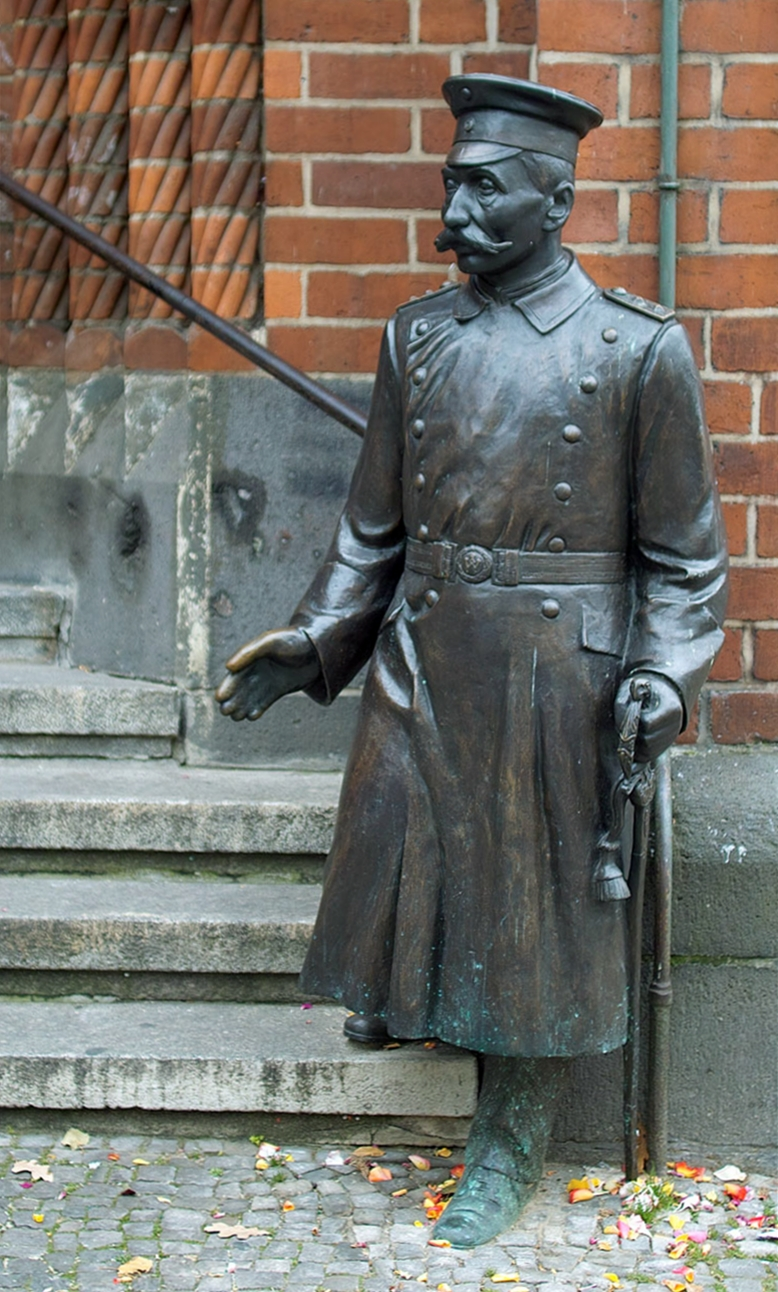
A statue of Wilhelm Voigt as the Captain of Köpenick at Köpenick city hall (by Spartak Babajan)

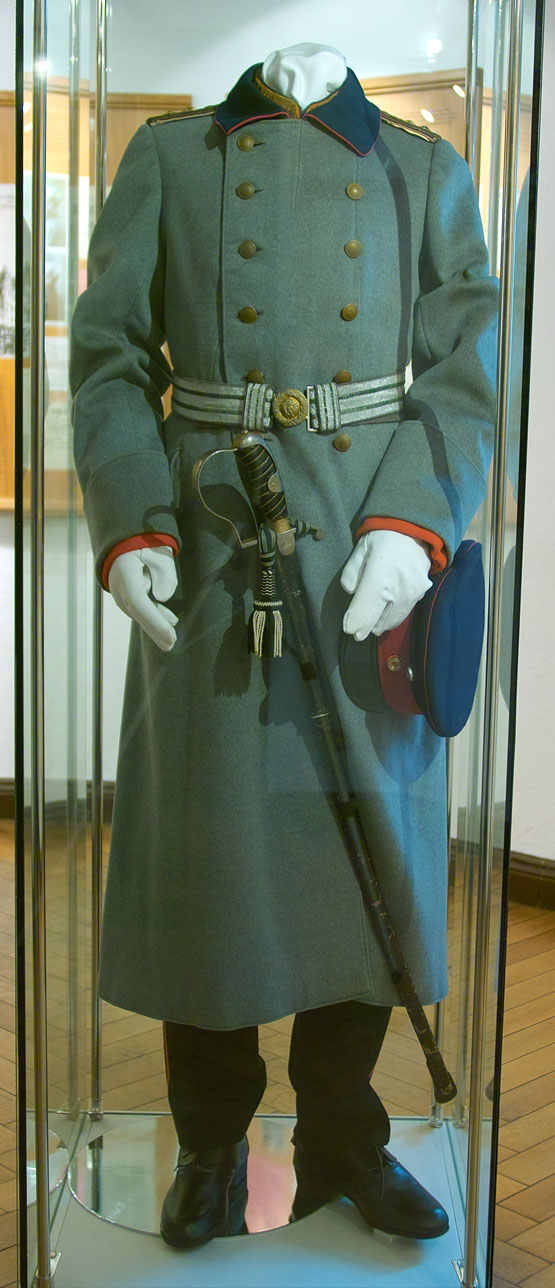
Uniform worn by Wilhelm Voigt as the Captain of Köpenick

While men in uniform were still treated with enormous respect in German culture, it should not be pretended that the German people or their government were incapable of laughing at their own military or their own actions towards it. On 16 October 1906, former convict Wilhelm Voigt secretly dressed himself in an elite Prussian Guards Captain's uniform, the elements of which he had purchased from different second hand shops, and with it bluffed a group of Imperial German Army enlisted men into placing the Mayor of Köpenick and city treasurer of under arrest for political corruption. Voigt then "confiscated" more than 4,000 marks from the city treasury, changed back into civilian clothing, and disappeared. Following a police and military investigation, Voigt was arrested, convicted of forgery, impersonating an officer, and false imprisonment, and incarcerated. The case was cited by British writers such as G.K. Chesterton to criticize what they saw as the excessive militarism of the Second Reich and the blind obedience and subservience to authority in German culture. In contrast, the German people overwhelmingly found the exploit both clever and hysterically funny. Eventually the last Kaiser, who also admired Voigt's cleverness and boldness, pardoned him and ordered his early release from incarceration. Voigt then spent many years giving public lectures about the exploit to paying audiences and abandoned his former life of crime.

Meanwhile, relations with Britain were badly strained by the Scramble for Africa and, even more so, by the Anglo-German naval arms race. Wilhelm's fascination with the Royal Navy, which led him to give his full support to Grand Admiral Alfred von Tirpitz's ambition to see the Imperial German Navy established as an instrument of national prestige, were still reflected in everyday German culture long after the overthrow of the monarchy in 1918.

Until the mid-20th century, young German boys were still dressed in sailor suits to impress them at an early age with the Navy's aura and prestige as the gentlemen's branch of the service. For this reason, the Imperial German Navy's most successful combat commanders of the Great War, such as Maximilian von Spee, Felix von Luckner, Karl von Müller, Hellmuth von Mücke, Otto Hersing, Otto Weddigen, and Lothar von Arnauld de la Perière, became widely revered national icons and, if they fell, martyrs.

A very similar national iconization also took place within the Imperial German Flying Corps following the advent of aerial warfare. The most successful World War I flying aces such as Max Immelmann, Oswald Boelcke, Manfred von Richthofen, Werner Voss, and Karl Allmenröder, were regarded as national heroes and, if they fell, as martyrs. Their fellow World War I flying ace Hermann Göring was once similarly regarded, until his heroic image was first tarnished and then destroyed completely by his role in later chapters of German history.

The gravesites of Oswald Boelcke and Manfred von Richthofen, on the other hand, remain sites of secular pilgrimage for both officers and enlisted men of the 21st century Air Force of the Federal Republic of Germany, which regards both World War I flying aces as their founding fathers. Furthermore, to many people worldwide who both admire and revere the flying aces of the Great War, Richthofen, in particular, is seen as embodying the best traditions of the officer corps of the last Kaiser's Germany.

== Criminal underworld ==
Even though the German people are traditionally stereotyped as law-abiding and subservient to the authority of the police and the courts, this stereotype does not fit the Wilhelmian era.

For example, the 1900-1902 manhunt for Mathias Kneißl, a peasant outlaw, copkiller, and poacher in the Dachau District of Kingdom of Bavaria witnessed the local Bavarian peasantry overwhelmingly cheering him on as a John Dillinger-style folk anti-hero. Policemen were assigned from other regions of Bavaria and often could not speak or understand the local dialect. What was worse, police corruption was considered so common in the region that Kneißl's slaying of two cops during a Wild West-style gunfight on 30 November 1900 made him very popular, long after his capture, trial, and execution for their murders in 1902. According to German forensic scientist Mark Benecke, however, Mathias Kneißl never saw himself as a Robin Hood figure and was, in reality, "just a man who went astray with no way of getting back."

In 1891, the Imperial Capital of Berlin witnessed the birth of organized crime in Germany in the form of oath bound secret societies for former convicts called the Ringvereine (Sporting Clubs"). The Ringvereine often carried romantic sounding names such as Immertreu ("Forever True"), Felsenfest ("Firm as a Rock"), Nordpiraten ("Northern Pirates"), and Apachenblut ("Apache Bloods") and completely dominated both racketeering, prostitution, and the illegal drug trade of Berlin. As early as 1895, the Ringvereine were having their first "business" dealings with the American Mafia, but their power and political influence only reached its height after the November Revolution of 1918. Only the secret police forces of Nazism and postwar Stalinism, who shot both real and suspected Ringverein members en masse and sent many others to concentration camps without requiring the niceties of evidence, broke the Sporting Clubs' power.

== Culture and the arts ==
In a December 1931 conversation in Frankfurt with journalist Heinrich Simon, Harry Graf Kessler was asked for the reasons why, despite being a descendant of the German nobility, he embraced the concept of Republicanism and opposed the post-1918 restoration of the House of Hohenzollern. According to Count von Kessler, "William II's downright perverse bad taste, I said, was more responsible than anything else. Bad taste in the selection of his friends and advisors; bad taste in art, literature, politics and his style of living; bad taste revealed by every word he uttered... A crowned barbarian who gave the whole German nation a reputation for barbarity."

Despite Count von Kessler's later contempt for the cultural life during the final decades of the German Empire, the Wilhelmian era also seethed with radical innovation, literary, artistic, and cultural ferment inside the literary coffee houses, theatres, and bohemian urban quarters of Berlin, Munich, and many other German cities.

Meanwhile, the Dresden-based artist's group Die Brücke (The Bridge) was one of two groups of iconoclastic German painters fundamental to expressionism, the other being the Munich-based Der Blaue Reiter (The Blue Rider) group.

In addition to witnessing the birth of modern art, the same era also witnessed the introduction of the Symbolist movement into German literature and the creation of the modern German literary language by passionately Francophile poet Stefan George and the George-Kreis, the circle of younger poets and writers that surrounded him.

Among many other examples of the power and influence the George-Kreis wielded over Germany cultural and literary life, the scholarly and editorial skills of one member, Norbert von Hellingrath, were singlehandedly responsible for the revival of interest in the German romantic poet Friedrich Hölderlin, who had died unrecognized following decades of incarceration in a tower at Tübingen following a mental breakdown in 1806. Hellingrath, who later fell at the Battle of Verdun in 1916, collected and published the collected works of Hölderlin in 1913 and succeeded in gaining for the Swabian poet in death the literary recognition that always eluded him in life. Norbert von Hellingrath is why Hölderlin is now widely considered one of the greatest poets ever to write in the German language.

Jeremy Adler has written that war poet and playwright August Stramm, who began publishing his poetry in early 1914, treated, "language like a physical material" and, "honed down syntax to its bare essentials." Citing Stramm's fondness for "fashioning new words out of old," Adler has also written that, "what James Joyce did on a grand scale for English, Stramm achieved more modestly for German."

Adler has also written that August Stramm's "essential innovation (still too little recognized in Germany) was to create a new, non-representational kind of poetry," which is, "comparable," to Pablo Picasso's creation of abstract art and to Arnold Schoenberg's revolution in the writing of Classical music.

In his 1985 book, The German Poets of the First World War, Patrick Bridgwater dubbed the literary movement inspired by Stramm's poetry, "the German variety of Imagism."

Shortly before the outbreak of war in 1914, T.E. Hulme heard the kind of poetry that Stramm had created and inspired being read aloud at the Cabaret Gnu in Berlin. Hulme later wrote, "Very short sentences are used, sometimes so terse and elliptical as to produce a blunt and jerky effect ... It is clear that a definite attempt is being made to use the language in a new way, an attempt to cure it of certain vices."

Even though it is widely associated with the later plays of Berthold Brecht, the Second Reich also witnessed the iconoclastic invention of modern theatrical staging by Catholic poet and playwright Reinhard Sorge and stage director Max Reinhardt, under the influence of Stefan George, Friedrich Nietzsche, and Richard Dehmel.

Sorge's The Beggar was written during the last three months of 1911. According to Michael Paterson, "The play opens with an ingenious inversion: the Poet and Friend converse in front of a closed curtain, behind which voices can be heard. It appears that we, the audience, are backstage and the voices are those of the imagined audience out front. It is a simple, but disorienting trick of stagecraft, whose imaginative spatial reversal is self-consciously theatrical. So the audience is alerted to the fact that they are about to see a play and not a 'slice of life.'"

According to Walter H. Sokel, "The lighting apparatus behaves like the mind. It drowns in darkness what it wishes to forget and bathes in light what it wishes to recall. Thus the entire stage becomes a universe of [the] mind, and the individual scenes are not replicas of three-dimensional physical reality, but visualizes stages of thought."

Tragically and in an added parallel to the many other nations experiencing similar cultural ferment during the same era, many of Germany's most gifted and innovative poets, writers, artists, and intellectuals were soon to die prematurely upon the battlefields of the Great War.

== End and legacy ==
The Wilhelmian era ended in the November Revolution of 1918, which had very close parallels to the February Revolution which had toppled the House of Romanov from the throne of the Russian Empire. First, riots broke out in the Imperial Capital, the last Kaiser announced his intention to divert troops from the battlefield to restore order, and found to his shock that he had lost the support of the Generals, who all demanded his immediate abdication. In response to Paul von Hindenburg's implied threat that the Imperial German Army would not protect the last Kaiser if he faced a similar death to that of his late cousin Tsar Nicholas II, Wilhelm II took Hindenburg's advice and requested political asylum in the neutral Netherlands.

Nevertheless, nostalgia for the German Empire and a desire for its restoration continued to exist. During the Weimar Republic, the German National People's Party (DNVP) and it's paramilitary wing Der Stahlhelm, openly sought to restore the Monarchy but instead found itself manipulated, outmaneuvered, sidelined, and then banned outright by Adolf Hitler and the Nazi Party.

During the same era, the death squad Organisation Consul, which considered both the November Revolution and the Versailles Treaty to be treasonous, routinely targeted political leaders involved with both for assassination. Even when they were caught and prosecuted, Organisation Consul members tended to receive lenient sentences from judges sympathetic to their views.

Even after the Second World War, nostalgia for the Wilhelmian era continued. In 1968 Der Spiegel reported that in a survey of their readers by Quick magazine about who would be the most honorable person to become President of the Federal Republic of Germany, the last Kaiser's grandson and heir, Prince Louis Ferdinand, the only one of twelve candidates who was not a politician, won with 39.8% before Carlo Schmid and Ludwig Erhard. In a similar survey by the tabloid Bild, readers chose Louis Ferdinand by 55.6%. In an interview with Quick, the prince indicated that he might accept the presidency but would not relinquish his claim to the Imperial or Prussian crowns.

In interviews with C.L. Sulzberger for the book The Fall of Eagles, Prince Louis Ferdinand further expressed a deep sense of admiration for the informal bicycle monarchy and crowned republic style favored and used by the Dutch, Belgian, and Scandinavian royal families. Praising how vehicles carrying the King or Queen would stop and wait at traffic lights, Louis Ferdinand stated that if the House of Hohenzollern were ever restored to the German throne during his lifetime, this same informality was a quality he fully intended to emulate.

Even after German Reunification in 1990, nostalgia continues. For example, the rebuilding of cities in the former East Germany which remained devastated by World War II bombing raids has often involved the reconstruction of demolished historic buildings from the German Empire or even earlier.

East German Premier Walter Ulbricht had ordered the demolition of both the Berlin Imperial Palace and the Garrison Church in Potsdam, sites which were closely associated with the former German Imperial Family and the ideology of the German Empire. Both buildings, however, are now being rebuilt, almost exactly as they were.

Moreover, the last Kaiser's home in exile and ultimate burial place, Huis Doorn in the Netherlands, opened its doors as a historic house museum in 1956. It remains an annual site of secular pilgrimage on the anniversary of the last Kaiser's death, which are organized by German monarchist organisations, such as Cologne-based Tradition und Leben, whose members often attend wearing period costumes.

In August 2011, despite the desire of both the bride and groom to keep things modest and low key, "Germany's own Royal wedding" between Prince George Friedrich of Prussia, the last Kaiser's great-great grandson and heir, and Princess Sophie of Isenburg was televised live and widely covered by the German news media. The 700 guests included: Prince Hassan bin Talal and Princess Sarvath al-Hassan of Jordan; Prince Laurent of Belgium; Lord and Lady Nicholas Windsor; and then Crown Princess Margareta of Romania. Following the ceremony, a reception was held on the grounds of the Sanssouci palace.

A less benign form of nostalgia for the Wilhelmian era was on display in the 2022 German coup d'état plot, by members of the Reichsbürger, 'Citizens of the Reich' movement, which considers the Federal Republic of Germany to be both illegal and illegitimate, as organized by the allegedly anti-Semitic "Patriotic Union" organization. The Patriotic Union, whose members included doctors, police officers, at least one judge, and many active duty German armed forces personnel, sought to violently overthrow the government of the Federal Republic and place Prince Henrich XIII of the House of Reuß upon the throne as the new Kaiser of a Fourth Reich. The Patriotic Union intended, however, for the Fourth Reich to be a restoration of the Second Reich as it existed prior to the November Revolution of 1918, rather than as a continuation of the Third Reich. The coup was prevented only by nationwide arrests by the German Federal Criminal Police (BKA), followed by multiple prosecutions. While it is known that meetings took place in which Prince Heinrich XIII sought the covert assistance of the Russian Federation's diplomats and foreign intelligence services, the Russian Government has repeatedly denied involvement in the coup plot.

In a letter dated 9 June 2020, Prince Heinrich XIII, who resented having bankrupted himself unsuccessfully seeking the restoration of his family's expropriated estates in the former GDR following German reunification, had previously denounced German royalists who desired the Fourth Reich to be a constitutional monarchy led by Prince Georg Friedrich, a known critic of Reichsbürger ideology, and Princess Sophie, as the new Kaiser and Empress. Such a Fourth Reich, according to the Prince of Reuss, would merely be a "monarchy at the mercy of the Allies" and the "federal republic 2.0."

German left wing politicians' and law enforcement's claims that the survival of democracy was in danger, however, drew contemptuous mockery by the conservative press in both Germany and Switzerland. In particular, the Berliner Zeitung termed the raids and criminal charges a “well-orchestrated PR stunt” which interrupted wishful thinking by “25 senile loons”.

While similarly reporting on the arrests for The Spectator, journalist Katja Hoyer commented, "While this kind of extremism is still rare, there has long been residual monarchism in Germany. Around 10 percent of Germans support the restoration of the royals; among those under thirty-four, that number is nearly one in five."

== In popular culture ==
- The 1966 film The Blue Max, which is set among the German flying aces of the Great War and which ends with the 1918 Revolution shown to be imminent, represents a more critical exploration of the German Empire. Similarly to Clint Eastwood's Flags of Our Fathers, the film critiques the deeply Machiavellian reasons why the propaganda of Governments at war chooses which warriors to exploit as national heroes. Other themes explored include the First World War being a major turning point for both sides in both the decline of chivalry and the advent of total war.
- Rainer Werner Fassbinder's 1976 comedy film Satan's Brew pokes fun at nostalgia for the Wilhelmine era by depicting a narcissistic writer in 1970s Munich who tries to become the Wilhelmian-era poet Stefan George, by always wearing period clothing with a white wig, and constantly lecturing a group of disciples, in a savage parody of the George-Kreis, about the Nietzschean ideology of the superman.
- The 2016 spy film The Exception, set in and around Huis Doorn during World War II and in which actor Christopher Plummer plays the exiled Kaiser, is also an example of subtle nostalgia for the Wilhelmian era. Throughout the film, the values of the constitutional monarchy that the former Kaiser still represents are repeatedly contrasted with those of both Adolf Hitler and Nazi Germany, and depicted as far preferable.

== See also ==
- Wilhelm Voigt
- Der Untertan
- Königliche Hoheit
- National Kaiser Wilhelm Monument
- Index of Germany-related articles

== Sources ==
- Cecil, Lamar (1989), Wilhelm II: Prince and Emperor, 1859–1900, Chapel Hill: University of North Carolina Press, ISBN 978-0-8078-1828-2.
- Geoff Eley (ed.) and James Retallack (ed.): Wilhelminism and Its Legacies. German Modernities and the Meanings of Reform, 1890–1930. Essays for Hartmut Pogge von Strandmann. Berghahn Books, New York and Oxford, 2003
- R. J. Evans (ed.) and Hartmut Pogge von Strandmann (ed.): The Coming of the First World War. Clarendon Press, 1990.
- John C. G. Röhl: The Kaiser and His Court: Wilhelm II and the Government of Germany. Cambridge University Press, 1966.
- John C. G. Röhl: Wilhelm II : The Kaiser's Personal Monarchy, 1888–1900. Cambridge University Press, 2004.
- John C. G. Röhl: Kaiser, Hof und Staat. Wilhelm II. und die deutsche Politik. C. H. Beck, Munich ³1988 (TB 2002), ISBN 978-3-406-49405-5.
- John C. G. Röhl: Wilhelm II., C. H. Beck, Munich 1993–2008:
  - Volume 1: Die Jugend des Kaisers, 1859–1888. Munich 1993, ²2001, ISBN 3-406-37668-1.
  - Volume 2: Der Aufbau der Persönlichen Monarchie, 1888–1900. Munich 2001, ISBN 3-406-48229-5.
  - Volume 3: Der Weg in den Abgrund, 1900–1941. Munich 2008, ISBN 978-3-406-57779-6. (online review by Lothar Machtan, Institut für Geschichtswissenschaft, Bremen University on http://hsozkult.geschichte.hu-berlin.de/)
- Fritz Fischer: Griff nach der Weltmacht. Die Kriegszielpolitik des kaiserlichen Deutschland 1914/18 (1961), Droste 2000 (reprint of special edition, 1967), ISBN 3-7700-0902-9.
- Steinberg, Jonathan (2011). Bismarck: A Life. Oxford University Press. ISBN 978-0199975396.
- Taylor, Alan John Percivale (1967). Bismarck, the Man and the Statesman. New York: Vintage Books. ISBN 978-0-394-70387-9.
