= Heinrich XIII =

Heinrich XIII may refer to:

- Heinrich XIII, Prince Reuss of Greiz, born 1747
- Heinrich XIII Prinz Reuss, born 1951
