= Flame of Peace =

Award

- Flamme des Friedens
- Logo of the organization
- Formation: 31 January 2008
- Founder: Archduchess Herta Margarete Habsburg-Lothringen
- Type: Non-profit organization
- Purpose: Advancement of Peace
- Headquarters: A-1010 Wien, Kärntner Ring 9
- Location: Austria
- President: Archduchess Herta Margarete Habsburg-Lothringen
- Website: www.flameofpeace.at

The Flame of Peace (Flamme des Friedens) is an award granted by the Austrian non-profit organization Vereins zur Förderung des Friedens (Association for the Promotion of Peace), which promotes world peace. Its symbol is a flame carving in wood and mounted on a stone base. The organization presents awards to prominent people, peace activists, and organizations in recognition of their activity in promoting peace.

== Organization and leadership ==
Archduchess Herta Margarete Habsburg-Lothringen, then known as Herta Margaret Öfferl, founded the organization in January 2008. She later married Archduke Sandor of Austria. She had already been working for several years on the promotion of peace initiatives. She serves as its president.

The organization is non-profit, non-partisan and religiously unaligned. It is dedicated to promoting and rewarding endeavors to promote peace. It has given awards to individuals and organizations since 2008. Recipients have included politicians, diplomats, media representatives and peace activists.

The board of the Association consists of Herta Margarete Habsburg-Lothringen and her children. The Habsburg-Lothringens use the titles of Archdukes of Austria and Prince of Tuscany, styled as Imperial Highness, though Sandor Habsburg-Lothringen, son of Dominic von Habsburg, is only listed as Count of Habsburg in the Almanach de Gotha Edition of 2000. (Note: The Sovereign Military Order of Malta has characterized their use of the title "Protector" of the Sovereign Hospitaller Order of St. John of Jerusalem – Knights of Malta.l as a "pretended title of a pseudo-order".)

The symbol of the prize is a wood carving of a flame mounted on a stone base.

== Awarding Process and Criticism ==
The criteria for conferring the "Flame of Peace" award are broadly defined within the statutes of the issuing association, encompassing general merits in peace promotion, international understanding, and the preservation of tradition. However, the award lacks a standardized, independent nomination or evaluation system. Because the issuing organization, the Peace Promotion Association (Verein zur Förderung des Friedens), is legally and operationally managed by its founder and president, Herta Margarete Habsburg-Lothringen, the awarding body and the selecting body are identical. Selection decisions rest entirely at the sole discretion of the leadership without any independent jury, external oversight, or feedback loop.

International observers and journalists have characterized the award as a public relations and networking tool. Criticism has focused particularly on the fact that the award has repeatedly been bestowed upon controversial or autocratic heads of state and government officials—such as Yemeni President Ali Abdullah Saleh in 2009 and the Prime Minister of Bahrain, Khalifa bin Salman Al Khalifa, in 2016—at times when their respective regimes faced severe allegations of human rights violations or were actively engaged in armed conflicts. Critics note that the grand staging of the award ceremonies within a seemingly imperial, monarchical framework—facilitated by the leadership's use of noble titles that have been legally abolished in Austria since 1919—primarily serves the mutual public relations interests of the involved parties.

== Sample monuments ==
Year	Location	Description
2009	Vienna, Austria	In March 2009 Flamme des Friedens president Herta Margaret Öfferl unveiled a monument of the Flame of Peace in the foyer of the Schloss Wilhelminenberg in Vienna. The event was attended by Christian Berlakovits (Austrian Ambassador to Italy), Vesna Borozan (Ambassador of the Republic of Macedonia), Prince Bernard (Consulate of Cameroon), Silvia Davidoiu (Ambassador of Romania), Ahmed Alwan al-Alwani Mulhi (Ambassador of Yemen) and Ashot Hovakimian (Ambassador of Armenia).
2009	Sana'a, Yemen	In September 2009 Herta Margaret Öfferl presented the award to Marshal Ali Abdullah Saleh, President of the Republic of Yemen, and unveiled a peace memorial in Yemen.
2012	Mitterdorf, Austria	On 14 March 2012 Oleksandr Ledyda, governor of Ukraine's Zakarpattia Oblast, visited Mitterdorf in Styria, where a Flame of Peace monument was unveiled. The Ukrainian ambassador Bereznyi Andryi and commercial attaché Gennadyi Boldyr also attended the ceremony.
2012	Ernstbrunn, Austria	On 26 May 2012 the association unveiled a peace monument in front of the Thomasl volunteer fire station in Ernstbrunn, Lower Austria.
2018	Gera, Germany	2018 Herta and Sandor Habsburg unveiled a peace monument in Gera in the presence of Heinrich Reuss, later arrested on charges of plotting a far-right coup d'état against the German government with a “terrorist organization” by violence and military means.

== Sample awards ==
Year	Location	Recipient	Description
2008	Rome, Italy	Christian B.M. Berlakovits	In October 2008 Herta Öfferl, President of Flamme des Friedens, presented the Flame of Peace to Dr. Christian B.M. Berlakovits, the Austrian Ambassador in Rome.
2009	Vienna, Austria	Goldenes Kreuz hospital	In November 2009 Herta Margret Öfferl presented the Flame of Freedom award to the Goldenes Kreuz private hospital in Vienna on its 90th anniversary, in recognition of its humanitarian efforts.
2010	Mistelbach, Austria	Christian Werner	Military Bishop Christian Werner and a soldier at the Bolfras Barracks in Mistelbach were recipients.
2013	Monaco	International School	In 2013 Herta Margarete Habsburg Lothringen awarded the Young Flame of Peace Award to the International School of Monaco for their participation in the United Nations Art for Peace 2012 project.
2013	Bergdietikon, Austria	Jaroslaw Starzyk	According to the Polish Embassy in Bern, Switzerland, Archduchess (Note: Herta Öfferl is sometimes styled "Archduchess". She married Sandor, Graf von Habsburg-Lothringen, after he divorced his first wife in 2009. He is the son of Dominic, Archduke of Austria. Sandor may use the title "Count" (Graf), but not "Archduke".) Margarete Herta Habsburg-Lothringen gave the "Flame of Peace" award to Ambassador Jaroslaw Starzyk on 31 August 2013 at the Bachlechner Art Gallery in Bergdietikon. The gallery published photographs of the event.
2014	Frauensee, Austria	Wolfgang Laubinger	Wolfgang Laubinger, the founder and director of camps of the Evangelical Church of Gütersloh was one of the recipients of the Bronze Medal of Merit from the organization.
2015	Venice, Italy	Regional Council of Veneto	On 24 March 2015 the Flame of Peace Award was given to the Regional Council of Veneto at a concert held in memory of World War I attended by over 1,000 people. Attendees included Italian Defence Minister Roberta Pinotti, the vice president of the Veneto Region, Marino Zorzi and the President of the Regional Council of Veneto, Clodovaldo Ruffato, who accepted the award.

== International delegates and representatives ==
The Flame of Peace Association appoints international delegates and representatives to promote its mission of fostering peace, humanitarian activities, and environmental protection around the world. Delegates represent the organization in their respective countries, organizing initiatives, ceremonies, and projects aligned with the Flame of Peace's objectives.

Notable international delegates and representatives include:

Andrew Charalambous (United Kingdom) – Delegate for England.

James de Balliol-Cavendish, Baron of Buittle (Scotland) – Delegate for Scotland.

Amina Leelo Weevo-Alghamdy (Bahrain) – Delegate for Bahrain.

Dzaner Arnaut von Efendic (Bosnia and Herzegovina) – Delegate for Bosnia and Herzegovina.

Liu Weiwei (China) – Delegate for China.

Maggie Tin (China) – Ambassador of the Young Flame of Peace (Orient).

Robin Matthes (Curaçao) – Delegate for Curaçao.

Bernd Höhle (Germany) – Special Delegate for Lower Saxony.

Danny Koch (Germany) – Delegate for Brandenburg.

Josef Lang (Germany) – Delegate for Bavaria and Hungary.

Peter Ritter von und zu Dzionsko (Germany) – Representative of the Flame of Peace.

Raymond Schulz (Germany) – Delegate for Köthen, Saxony-Anhalt.

Werner Hinz (Germany) – Delegate for Bavaria.

Dr. Guillaume Arnau Arquer (France) – Delegate for France.

Stephane Cappellaro (France) – Representative of the Flame of Peace France.

Tonis Breidel Hadjdemetriou (Greece) – Delegate for Greece.

Gagandeep Singh (India) – Representative for India.

Dott.ssa Isabella Celeste Vignoli D’Este (Italy) – Representative for Italy.

Priska Ferrari and Kosmas Mader (Italy) – Delegates for South Tyrol and Northern Italy.

H.E. Chev. Stephen Lautens (Canada) – Delegate for Canada.

Yvonne Apiyo Brändle-Amolo (Kenya) – Delegate for Kenya.

Mag. Carmen Dahl (Liechtenstein) – Delegate for Liechtenstein.

Mag.phil. Lina Pestal (Lithuania) – Delegate for Lithuania.

GR Ing. Michael Georg Martin Danzinger (Luxembourg) – Delegate for Luxembourg.

Maria Helga Muscat-Grölz (Malta) – Consulate for Malta.

Jean Stanoevski (Macedonia) – Delegate for Macedonia.

Nikola Bleiberschnig (Macedonia) – Delegate for Macedonia.

Claudine Cracchiolo-Konieczny (Monaco) – Consulate of the Flame of Peace Monaco.

Verena Meyer (Monaco) – Consulate of the Flame of Peace Monaco.

Shida and Peter Bliek (Netherlands) – Delegates for the Netherlands.

Ernests Barons (Norway) – Delegate of the Flame of Peace for Norway.

Hermann Kroiher (Nordic Countries) – Special Delegate for Norway, Sweden, Finland, Greenland, and Iceland.

Bethy Leonarda De La Cruz Cerda (Peru) – Delegate for Peru.

Maria Edelman (Poland) – Delegate for Poland.

Dr. Vinzenz von Holle (Switzerland) – Consultant and Delegate for Switzerland.

Hanns and Beatrice Bachlechner (Switzerland) – Special Delegates for Switzerland.

Ivana McCann (Serbia) – Delegate for Serbia.

Dominica Mudra (Slovakia) – Representative of the Flame of Peace Slovakia.

Mag. Anatoliy Chernychenko (Slovakia) – Delegate for Slovakia.

Renata Kliská (Slovakia) – Delegate for Bratislava.

DI Abdalla Sharief (Sudan) – Consultant and Delegate for Sudan.

Julia Lanske MBA (Thailand) – Delegate for Thailand.

Peter Lanske (Thailand) – Delegate for Thailand.

Dipl.-Ing. Otto Lehner (Czech Republic) – Delegate for the Czech Republic.

Ing. Eva Balikova (Czech Republic) – Special Delegate for the Czech Republic.

Anastasiya Zelenskaya (Ukraine) – Representative of the Flame of Peace for Kiev and Odessa.

Viktor Golin (Ukraine) – Embassy Delegate and Management Representative.

Csilla Zsuzsanna Cselőtei (Hungary) – Representative of the Flame of Peace Hungary.

Péter Bárdossy (Hungary) – Special Delegate for Hungary.

Ms. Nguyen Thanh Phuong (Vietnam) – Special Delegate for Vietnam.

== Partnerships ==
The Flame of Peace Association collaborates with academic institutions to promote peace education, including a partnership with the Swiss School Of Business Research (SSBR) to establish the Peace-making MBA, formally known as the Master in Peace & Humanitarian Management. As part of this collaboration, the Flame of Peace sponsors a scholarship fund covering 50% of tuition fees for students enrolling in the program, supporting the development of future leaders in global peace and humanitarian efforts.

== Global Engagements ==
In April 2025, the Flame of Peace Association co-hosted the World Leader Summit of Love and Peace in Vienna, Austria, alongside the Federation of World Peace and Love (FOWPAL), the Kingdom of Bahrain, and the DIGNITY Foundation. The summit marked the 6th International Day of Conscience and celebrated the United Nations' adoption of the International Day of Hope, bringing together more than 100 international leaders and visionaries to promote global peace, conscience, and mutual respect.
