= 2017 Austrian coup d'état plot =

Failed attempt to overthrow Austrian government

2017 Austrian coup attempt
- Part of the Sovereign citizen movement
Date	April 20, 2017; 9 years ago
Location	Vienna, Graz
Result	Coup failed, Plotters arrested

Belligerents
Government of Austria	"Staatenbund"; Supported by: Russia

Commanders and leaders
Alexander Van der Bellen; Christian Kern	Monika Unger

Casualties and losses
Unknown	26 plotters detained 14 plotters sentenced to prison

On April 21, 2017, the Austrian Interior Ministry announced that an operation consisting of 454 police arrested 26 members of the "Staatenbund" movement on April 20, for allegedly plotting to topple the Austrian government in a coup with assistance from the Russian government.

== Plot ==
The self-proclaimed "president" of the Staatenbund (lit. 'Confederation of States') was a 42-year-old woman named Monika Unger, who had established a network of like-minded sovereign citizens often compared to the German Reichsbürger movement. According to the ministry of the interior, Unger had attempted to use her Staatenbund to "order" the Austrian Army to overthrow the government and was in contact with the Russian government for potential military assistance and intervention to ensure the coup was successful. It was claimed by the Staatenbund that at the time of the arrests they had 2,600-3,600 members, but in their investigation the ministry of the interior placed the number closer to 1,000. Unger's second in command was a 72-year old former police officer.

The Staatenbund, as with other sovereign citizen movements, argued that the Austrian state was illegitimate, and, due to a series of claimed legal loopholes, that they were the legitimate government instead. They forbid their members from paying taxes, issued their own "passports" and entered in its own "land registry" where they garnered a revenue via mortgage payments by members. The group also forbid their members from getting government issued identification cards and license plates, and ordered them to refuse to pay any fine levied against them by the state. Austrian media described the efforts by the Staatenbund as trying to form a rival "parallel government" to the Austrian government in order to undermine and discredit it. The membership of the Staatenbund was described as an eclectic mix of neo-Nazis, anarcho-capitalists and esoterics and mostly either pensioners or the homeless. The plot would have seen Unger, her supporters, elements of the military that sided with her, and Russian military personnel go door to door arresting local government officials, bankers and judges to put them on "trial" and replace them with loyalists.

== Arrests ==
On April 20, 2017, the Austrian police undertook a large operation consisting of 454 police officers to arrest the 26 leaders of the Staatenbund, including Unger. In 2019 Unger was sentenced to 14-years in prison for inciting high treason while her deputy was sentenced to 10-years on the same charge. Twelve other members received prison sentences between nine months and three years for serious fraud and coercion. In her defense Unger argued that she was a "victim of an oppressive system." Her defense lawyers, however, centered their defense on the claim the Staatenbund was "utter nonsense, but not dangerous."

== See also ==
- 2022 German coup d'état plot, a similar plot by a similar group of sovereign citizens in Germany
