= Birgit Malsack-Winkemann =

German politician (AfD)

Birgit Malsack-Winkemann MdB a.D.
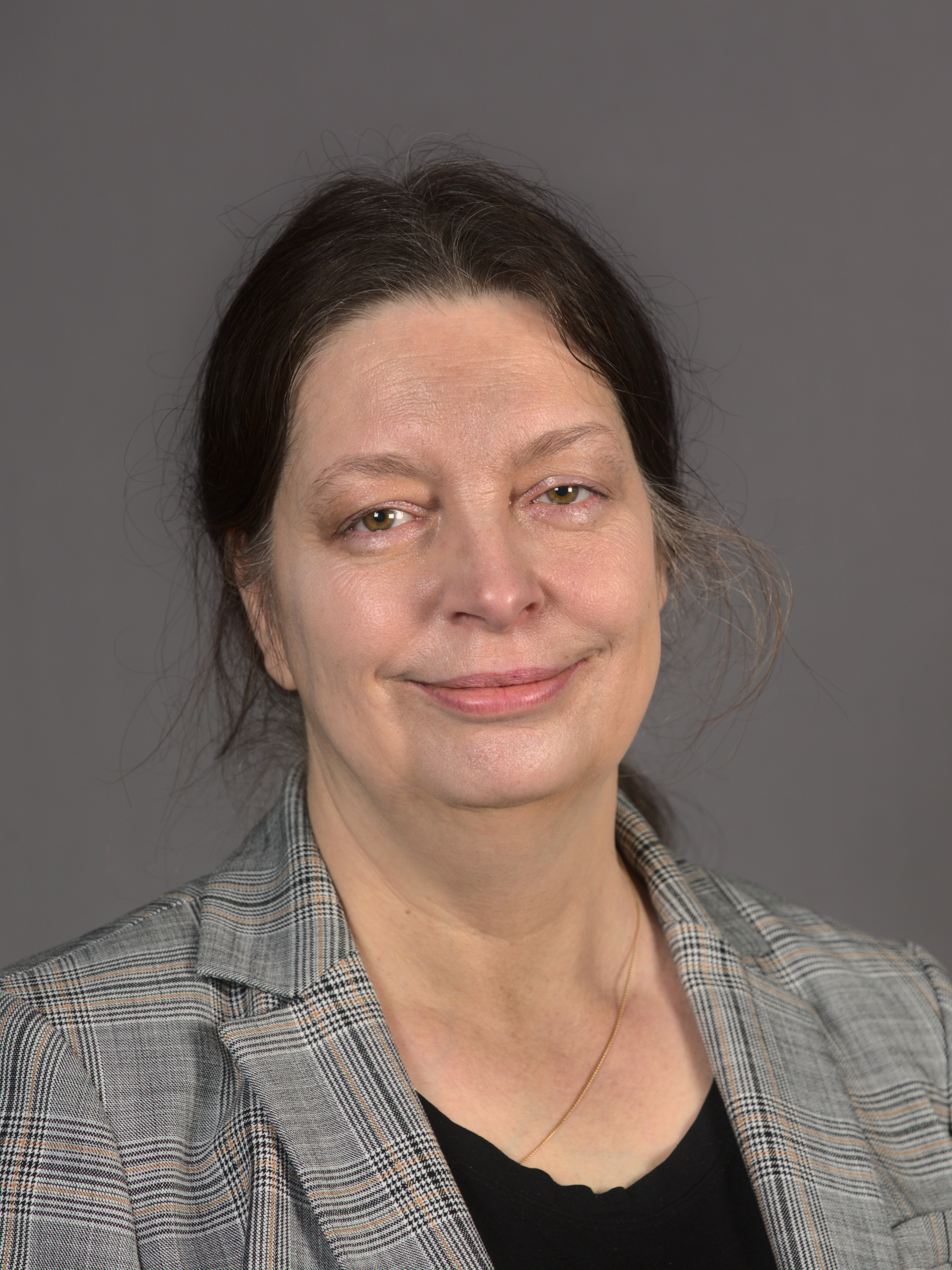
- Malsack-Winkemann in 2020

Member of the Court of Arbitration of the Alternative for Germany for the Second Chamber
- Incumbent
- Assumed office 29 November 2020 Serving with Walter Wissenbach, Roland Ulbrich
- Preceded by: Monica-Ines Oppel

Member of the Bundestag for Berlin
- In office 24 October 2017 – 26 October 2021
- Preceded by: multi-member district
- Succeeded by: multi-member district
- Constituency: Alternative for Germany List

Personal details
- Born: 12 August 1964 (age 62) Darmstadt, Hesse, West Germany
- Party: Alternative for Germany (2013–)
- Children: 2
- Education: Heidelberg University (Dr. jur.)
- Occupation: Politician; Judge
- Website: Bundestag website

Birgit Malsack-Winkemann (born 12 August 1964) is a German far-right politician and former judge, and had a main role in the uncovered 2022 German coup d'état plot of "Patriotic Union" group. She was a member of the 19th Bundestag from 2017 to 2021 for the Alternative for Germany (AfD), of which she has been a member since 2013. After losing re-election to the Bundestag in 2021, Winkemann returned to her previous position as a judge in the Berlin regional court.

On 7 December 2022, she was arrested during a large-scale raid against an alleged right-wing terrorist association with roots stemming from within the Reichsbürger movement.

== Biography ==
Malsack-Winkemann was born on 12 August 1964 in Darmstadt and studied law at Ruprecht-Karls-Universität Heidelberg. From 2003 to 2017 Malsack-Winkemann worked as a judge in the state of Berlin. In 2013 she joined the newly founded AfD and became a member of the Bundestag in 2017. In June 2021 she was nominated in 5th position on the AfD state candidate list for Bundestag, after she lost against Georg Pazderski - with the state party only winning 3 proportionally allocated seats, she lost re-election.

She has been a member of the AfD's party Court of Arbitration since June 2022.

Malsack-Winkemann has two children.

== December 2022 arrest ==
In the morning of 7 December 2022, she was arrested for her alleged involvement with a group of right-wing extremists connected to the Reichsbürger movement, which had planned a coup against the German government. She would have become the Minister of Justice of the government which would be formed if they had managed to realise their plan.

At a trial that started on 21 May 2024, Malsack-Winkemann and eight other defendants were charged with terrorism and high treason.

The Public Prosecutor General (GBA) accuses Malsack-Winkeman, among other things, of having infiltrated other defendants into the Bundestag and scouting out the buildings with them. Malsack-Winkemann is said to have belonged to the so-called Council of the "Patriotic Union". According to the GBA, the group planned an armed storming of the Bundestag in order to arrest members of parliament and bring about a system overthrow. She denies the allegations and describes her role as insignificant.
