= Heinrich XIII Prinz Reuss =

German real estate developer and alleged coup plotter (born 1951)

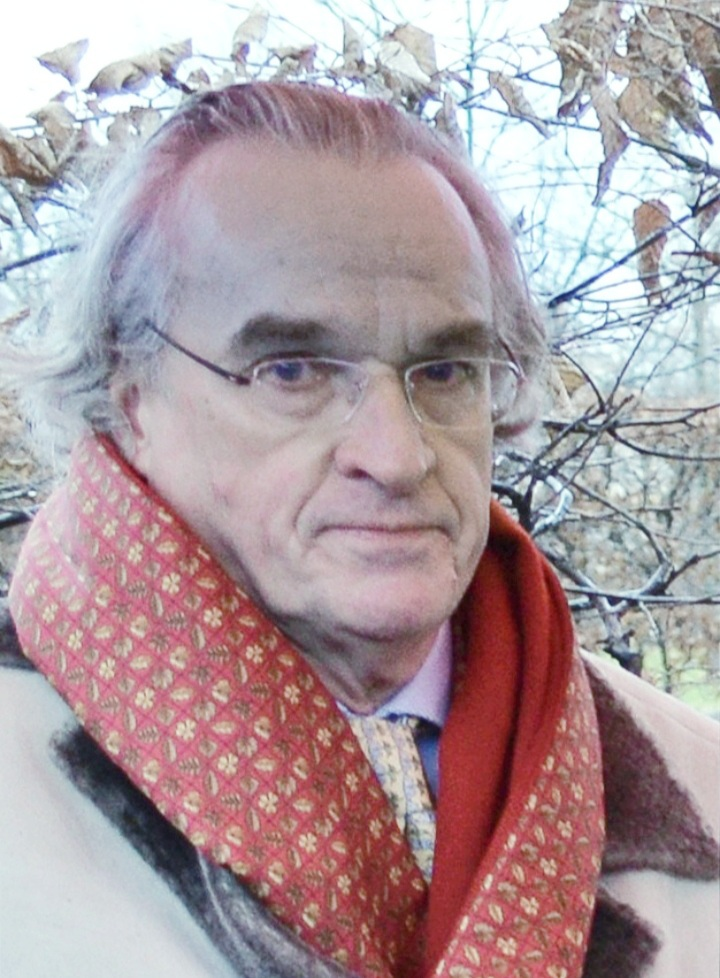
- Reuss during the unveiling of the Flame of Peace, 2018
- Born: 4 December 1951 (age 74); Büdingen, West Germany
- Occupation: Real estate developer
- Known for: Alleged leadership in 2022 German coup d'état plot
- Spouse: Susan Doukht Jalali (m. 1989, divorced)
- Partner: Vitalia B.
- Children: 2
- Parents: Heinrich I Prinz Reuss (father); Duchess Woizlawa Feodora of Mecklenburg (mother)
- Family: Reuss

Heinrich XIII Prinz Reuss (German: Heinrich XIII. Prinz Reuß, pronounced [ˈhaɪnʁɪç deːɐ̯ ˈdʁaɪˌtseːntə pʁɪnts ˈʁɔʏs]; born 4 December 1951) is a German businessman, far-right and monarchist activist, and member of the aristocratic – formerly sovereign – House of Reuss. A proponent of the Reichsbürger movement and antisemitic conspiracy theories, Reuss was arrested by German Federal Police in December 2022 due to his alleged leadership in the 2022 German coup d'état plot.

== Biography ==
=== Personal life and ancestry ===
Reuss was born in Büdingen on 4 December 1951, the fifth of six children and the fourth son born to Prince Heinrich I Reuss and Duchess Woizlawa Feodora of Mecklenburg, who was in turn the only child of the German colonial governor Duke Adolf Friedrich of Mecklenburg. Reuss's parents, like all German nobility, had become private citizens in 1919 upon the adoption of the Weimar Constitution, which abolished any privileges and titles that had previously existed for nobility.

The House of Reuss, from which Reuss is descended, dates to the 12th century and historically administered the regions of Gera and Greiz, a non-contiguous mini-state in what is today Eastern Thuringia. Reuss left the family association at his own request around 2009.

Reuss married Iranian-born Susan Doukht Jalali in 1989, and they have two children, including a son named Heinrich XXVIII (born circa 1991) and a daughter Elena, who has Down syndrome and was born in 1989. His wife uses the name Princess Susan Reuss and works as a naturopath. She has served as Germany's attaché to UNESCO in support of its program Education for Children in Need. Reuss is also reported to have as a girlfriend a Russian national identified by prosecutors as "Vitalia B.", aged 39 in 2022, at their arrest who allegedly had some role in the coup plot.

=== Business and family activities ===
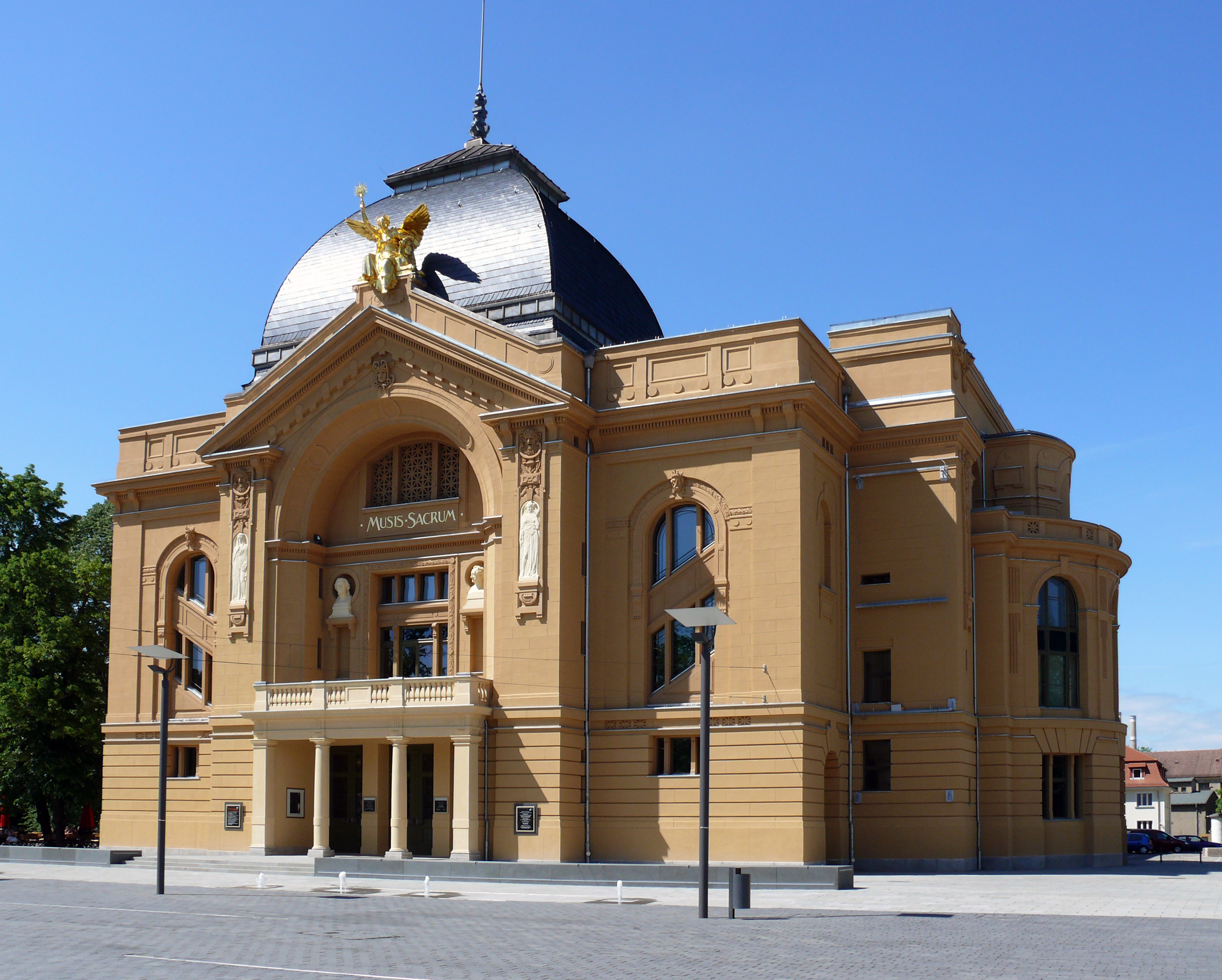
The restored Gera Theater in Thuringia, former property of Reuss's family which he unsuccessfully attempted to reclaim

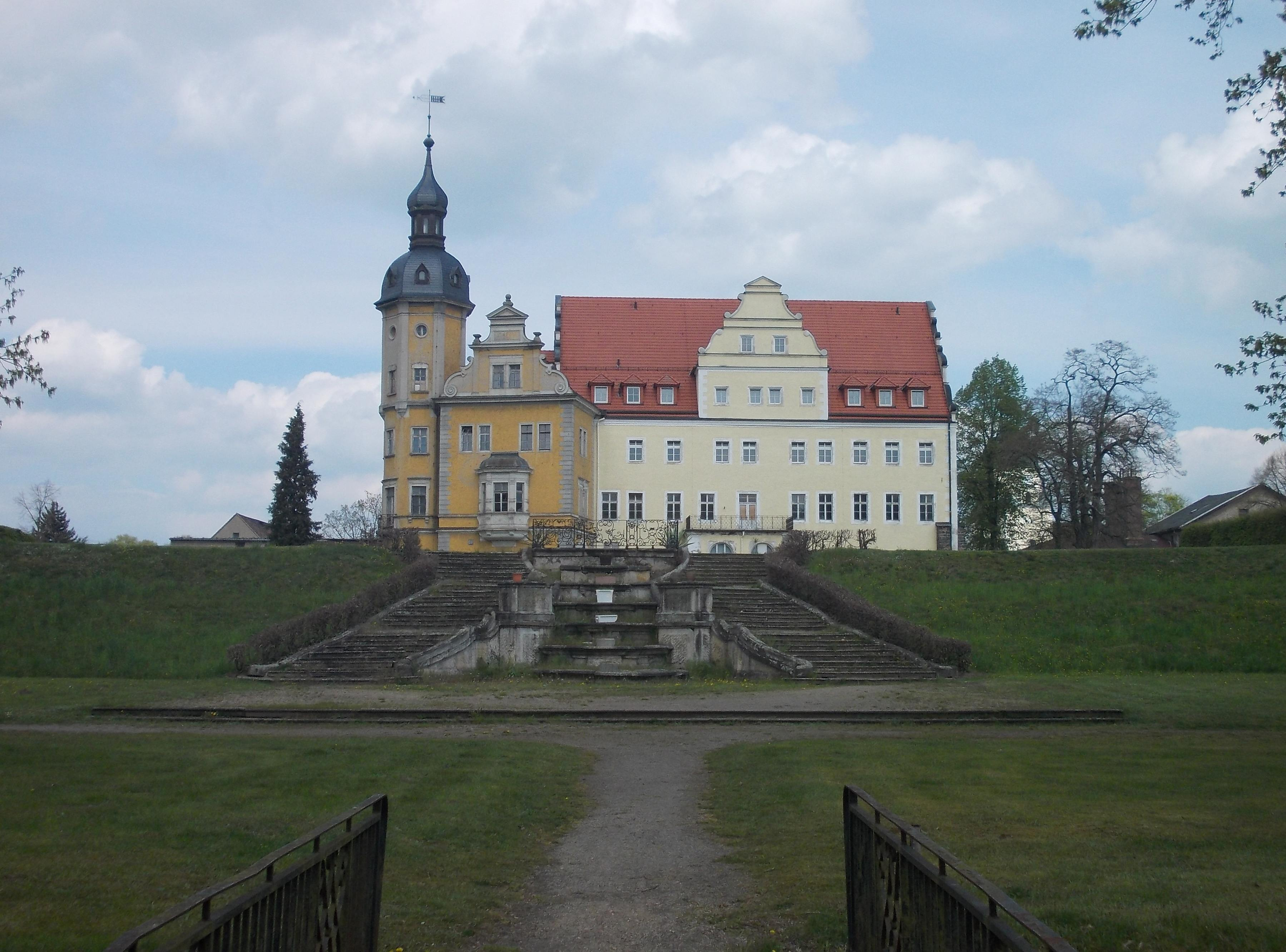
The restored Thallwitz Castle in Saxony was restituted; in 2022 abandoned and in a neglected condition.

Reuss worked as a real estate developer, operating a company named Büro Prinz Reuss in Frankfurt, and also produced sparkling wine.

In 1945, the Communist land reform in the Soviet occupation zone (East Germany) expropriated all movable and immovable assets of the House of Reuss. Following the reunification of Germany in 1990, Reuss tried to have properties restituted. The clan, which consisted of five large families, wanted Gera townhouses, four castles, extensive forestry and agricultural property and the Jugendstil Reuss Theater in Gera, then held by the city of Gera in Thuringia. Concerning the theater, Reuss and the mayor of Gera were unable to negotiate a settlement, each blaming the other.

Reuss spent much of his fortune on lawsuits seeking restitution, but with little success. He conducted court proceedings on behalf of his mother, who died in 2019, and obtained many artworks that were later sold at auction for 3.5 million marks while more than 300 pieces were lent to museums. In addition, he conducted court proceedings on behalf of his mother for former properties. However, he was not quite as unsuccessful in this as he claimed. In 2008, she obtained in a settlement the restitution of forest property and the restored Thallwitz Castle (formerly a hospital) in Saxony. He is said to have inherited it from her after persuading her to make him her sole heir – disinheriting his siblings. Today Thallwitz Castle is neglected. He ended up purchasing Jagdschloss Waidmannsheil in Bad Lobenstein from the state, from which he ran a hickory golf course. The hunting lodge is said to have served as a meeting place for the alleged conspirators.

In 2017, he supported the reinterment of the remains of a number of his ancestors, most prominent among them Henry II, Count of Reuss-Gera, in their original location. Their sarcophagi had been moved repeatedly since the church where they were entombed was destroyed in a fire in 1780.

=== Views and conspiracy theories ===
Many of Reuss's views are consistent with monarchism. He has called for "the revival of the legal structures" that existed before 1918, when the abolition of the monarchy "created so much suffering". He has spoken in favour of low flat tax for all citizens and against debt-based business models hailing the 10 percent rate in the former Principality of Reuss, saying it let Reuss's citizens lead "happy lives" because it was "straightforward and transparent". Reuss contended that the modern German government and European Union were more distant and inaccessible than feudal princes. Reuss also gave speeches claiming that Germany had been a vassal state since the Second World War. At World Web Forum in Zürich in 2019, Reuss gave a speech accusing the Rothschilds and Freemasons of responsibility for the wars of the 20th century, expressing antisemitic conspiracy theories. The speech left attendees "horrified", with some booing or leaving.

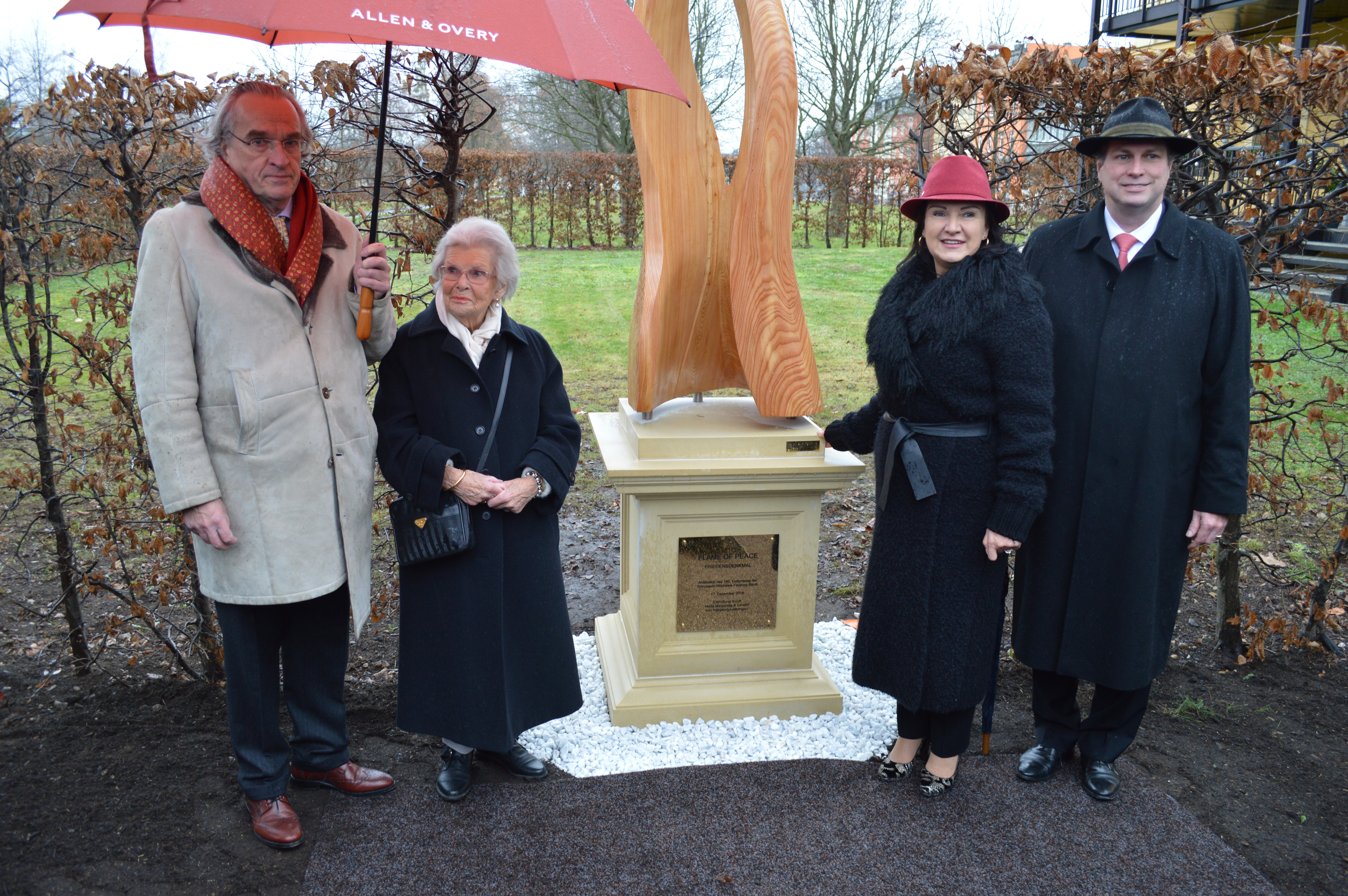
Reuss with his mother (left), Herta and Sandor Habsburg-Lothringen (right) unveiling the "Flame of Peace" in Gera

On 22 December 2018, Reuss and his mother attended the unveiling of a "Flame of Peace" sculpture in Gera in honor of her 100th birthday by the heads of the Vienna-based Association for the Promotion of Peace. In 2020, Reuss participated in the celebration of the first International Day of Conscience event in Vienna.

=== Assault on journalist Peter Hagen ===
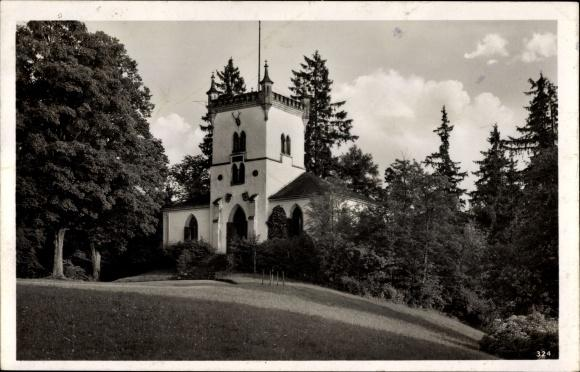
Reuss's hunting lodge Jagdschloss Waidmannsheil in Saaldorf (Bad Lobenstein), Thuringia, where meetings regarding the coup were allegedly held and weapons stockpiled

In August 2022, Reuss attended an official reception held by Thomas Weigelt, the mayor of Bad Lobenstein, where Reuss's hunting lodge Jagdschloss Waidmannsheil is located. Weigelt was known to be sympathetic to the Reichsbürger movement and journalist Peter Hagen asked him why someone associated with the Reichsbürger scene like Reuss would be invited to an official event. The next day Hagen approached the mayor at the market festival and tried to film him in familiar conversation with Reuss and AfD-politician Uwe Thrum. Filming the trio led to a violent attack by Weigelt on the journalist, which was captured on film. After injuring the journalist (who had to be treated in hospital) and damaging his equipment, Weigelt refused to resign and was suspended from office.

The incident attracted national attention. Federal Minister of the Interior Nancy Faeser condemned the assault and called for a full investigation of the incident. She stated "Fear, intimidation and violence must never be means of confrontation". Without free and critical media, there would be no democracy, she added. "This applies at all levels, especially on the ground in local reporting, where people meet directly day after day." Afterwards, the current head of the Reuss family, Heinrich XIV Fürst Reuss, (Note: Heinrich XIV Fürst Reuss, born in Vienna in 1955, has headed the House of Reuss since 2012. He lives in Austria with his wife and four children. After German reunification, his branch of the family won the restitution of some properties that had been expropriated in 1945 and he has maintained a second home in Bad Köstritz. As of 2018, his heir Heinrich XXIX Prinz Reuss, born 1997, planned to make Gera his home.) objected to his involvement in local politics "in the strongest possible way". He called Heinrich XIII, his third cousin, a "distant relative" and "a confused old man peddling in conspiracy theories".

=== Involvement in 2022 German coup plot ===
On 7 December 2022, Reuss was arrested at his home in the Westend district of Frankfurt during an extensive raid of alleged far-right conspirators planning a coup d'état. According to police, the coup's conspirators—which included former Bundestag member Birgit Malsack-Winkemann—were proponents of the Reichsbürger movement who hoped to install the 71-year-old Reuss as head of state Reuss's hunting lodge Jagdschloss Waidmannsheil in Saaldorf, Thuringia was allegedly the site of weapons stockpiles and meetings regarding the conspiracy.

Reuss and "Vitalia B." are reported to have reached out to the Russian government via its Consulate General in Leipzig, presumably for assistance in the coup. The conspirators allegedly planned to cooperate with Russia, but according to the Federal Prosecutor's Office of Germany, there was nothing to suggest that the Russians "reacted positively to his request." A spokesperson from the Russian Embassy in Berlin denied any involvement. Kremlin spokesman Dmitry Peskov said that it "appears to be a German internal problem".

Heinrich XIV Fürst Reuss distanced himself and his family again after Reuss was arrested in 2022, calling Reuss a "confused old man" and "a marginal figure" and noting that their last common ancestor lived in the early 19th century. He said Reuss's behaviour was a "catastrophe" for the family, whose heritage as tolerant and cosmopolitan rulers was now associated with "terrorists and reactionaries". He believes Reuss's anti-government views derive from his resentment at the German judicial system for its failure to recognize his claims to family properties expropriated at the end of World War II.

The trial of Reuss and eight other plotters began on 21 May 2024 in Frankfurt. It was still ongoing in December 2025.
