= Reichsbürger movement =

German far-right anti-government movement

The German Empire (a period of the German Reich) within its borders from 1871 to 1918

Reichsbürgerbewegung (German pronunciation: [ˈʁaɪ̯çsbʏʁɡɐbəˌveːɡʊŋ]; 'Reich Citizens' Movement') or Reichsbürger (German pronunciation: [ˈʁaɪ̯çsˌbʏʁɡɐ]; 'Reich Citizen[s]') are several anticonstitutional revisionist groups and individuals in Germany and elsewhere who reject the legitimacy of the modern German state, the Federal Republic of Germany, in favour of the German Reich.

Reichsbürger adherents typically espouse the belief that the German Reich was not succeeded by the Federal Republic of Germany under the principle of state succession. Instead, they hold that the Reich continues to exist in its pre-World War II or pre-World War I borders, and its legitimate government is one or another of the Reichsbürger organizations.

Reichsbürger have engaged in violence and criminal activities, and are monitored by the Federal Office for the Protection of the Constitution as extremist organizations. The latter estimated that some 21,000 people belong to the movement in Germany as of July 2021. People suspected of having ties to the movement have been accused of planning a coup against the German government in 2022 and arrested on several occasions, most notably 25 in the same instance.

== History ==
The original Kommissarische Reichsregierung (Commissary/Provisional Reich Government, KRR) was founded in 1985 by Wolfgang Gerhard Günter Ebel. The movement espouses conspiracy theories, antisemitism, and racism. The movement has been described as neo-Nazi in character, although The Economist reported in 2016 that Reichsbürger adherents "draw ridicule even from neo-Nazis". Many supporters of the Reichsbürger movement are also monarchists who support a restoration of the German Empire or Holy Roman Empire.

The German Federal Ministry of the Interior concludes that only a small part of the movement is part of the organized neo-Nazi milieu proper (for about 5%). Nonetheless, as the movement rejects the existence of the Federal Republic, it is very likely that members of the movement violate the legal order of the Federal Republic.

During the COVID-19 pandemic, the so-called Querdenker-movement was formed in Germany. The only consensus of the movement was the rejection of government measures against the pandemic. Many Reich citizens were also part of the Querdenker-movement. Reichsbürger and other right-wing extremists strengthened within this movement In 2021 the state office for the Protection of the Constitution in Lower Saxony published a study and came to the conclusion: "The mixing of corona deniers, Reichsbürger and right-wing extremists leads to a dangerous radicalization of corona denier and Querdenken-movement."

In December 2022, Germany arrested 25 people accused of planning a coup against the German government. Among the arrests was Heinrich XIII Prinz Reuss, who in the event the coup succeeded would have become head of state.

On May 13, 2025, the German Federal government banned "Königreich Deutschland" ("Kingdom of Germany"), a Wittenberg-based movement founded in 2012 and believed to be the main Reichsbürger organization. Four of its leaders were arrested and searches were conducted in seven German states. On August 7 the same year, the Bavarian criminal police arrested three men suspected of belonging to the Reichsbürger group. The arrests occurred in consequence of early-morning raids involving 300 investigators and targeting six individuals suspected of having taken part in a training event organized by the group in April 2022 at a shooting range near Bayreuth, which was believed by investigators to be in preparation for an attack on the Bundestag in Berlin. Electronic devices and weapons-regulated items were confiscated by officers for analysis in the raids.

== Definition and theories ==
A handbook of the state of Brandenburg classifies the Reichsbürger movement as "extremist" according to the framework of the Federal Office for the Protection of the Constitution (Verfassungsschutz). There, "extremist" refers to attitudes and ideologies that are directed against the basic conditions of a modern democracy and open society, such as the right of the people to elect their government democratically. The Verfassungsschutz defines the Reichsbürger movement as:

Groups and individuals who, for various motives and with various justifications, including [with reference to] the historical German Reich, conspiracy theory patterns of argumentation or a self-defined natural law, reject the existence of the Federal Republic of Germany and its legal system, deny the legitimacy of the democratically elected representatives or even define themselves in their entirety as being outside the legal system and are therefore prepared to commit violations of the legal system.

The Reichsbürger movement is characterized by a rejection of the modern Federal Republic of Germany; denial of its legality and legitimacy; and denial of the authority of the federal, state, and local governments in Germany. Reichsbürger believe that the political boundary of either the 1871 or 1932 borders still exist and that the modern Federal Republic of Germany is "an administrative construct still occupied by the Allied powers".

The Reichsbürger movement has used some of the concepts and techniques of the One People's Public Trust, an American sovereign citizen movement operated by pseudolaw ideologue Heather Ann Tucci-Jarraf. In comparison to the Union of Slavic Forces of Russia movement in the former Soviet Union, religious scholar Roman Silantyev identified similarities between the two movements:

| Reichsbürger movement | Witnesses of the USSR |
|---|---|
| 1. The Federal Republic of Germany is not a sovereign state, but a private company (GmbH, or "limited liability company"). | 1. The Russian Federation is not a sovereign state, but a kind of limited liability company (Closed Joint-stock company, or CJSC). |
| 2. The German Reich still exists today. | 2. The Union of Soviet Socialist Republics still exists today. |
| 3. After the end of World War II, Germany did not sign a peace treaty. | 3. There are no legitimate documents on the liquidation of the USSR. |
| 4. The Basic Law for the Federal Republic of Germany, which was transformed into a Constitution after the reunification of Germany, is not a (valid) Constitution. Only the Weimar Constitution and the Enabling Act of 1933 are valid. | 4. The Constitution of Russia exists only in the form of a draft, and the 1993 Russian constitutional referendum was illegitimate. Only the Constitution of the Soviet Union, whether it be the 1936 constitution or the 1977 constitution, is valid. |
| 5. The German government is controlled remotely from the United States. | 5. The government of the Russian Federation is actually an offshore company registered in Delaware and controlled remotely from the United States. |

=== Historical revisionism ===
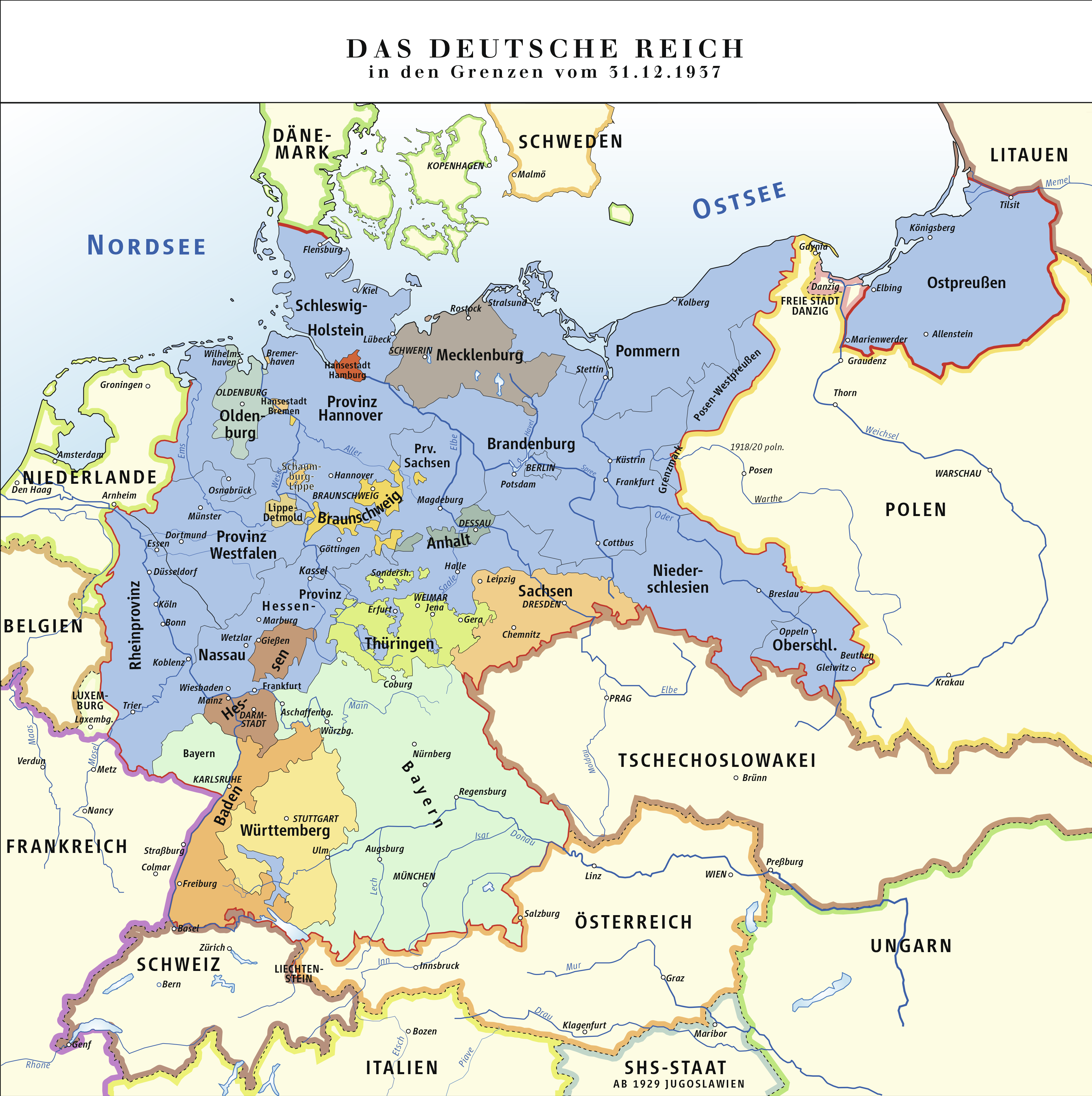
Germany in its international borders as of 31 December 1937. The date itself is insignificant, but it was used to denote Germany before Hitler's expansionism. The borders are also mentioned in the 1949 constitution of the Federal Republic. This is also the Germany meant in the statement of the Allied powers, that they are responsible for "Germany as a whole". In 1990, with German reunification, the concept became obsolete.

The self-described Reichsbürger maintain that the Federal Republic of Germany is illegitimate and that the Reich's 1919 Weimar Constitution (or an earlier constitution) remains in effect. The Reichsbürger use a variety of arguments. One of them is a selective reading of a 1973 decision of the Federal Constitutional Court concerning the 1972 treaty between West and East Germany.

In 1949, the Federal Republic of Germany ("West Germany") and the German Democratic Republic ("East Germany", GDR) were established. The constitution of the Federal Republic mentioned a Germany and a German people beyond the Federal Republic. An example is article 23 (old version):

This Basic Law shall initially apply in the territories of the states Baden, Bavaria, Bremen, Greater Berlin, Hamburg, Hesse, Lower Saxony, North Rhine-Westphalia, Rhineland-Palatinate, Schleswig-Holstein, Württemberg-Baden and Württemberg-Hohenzollern. In other parts of Germany it is to be put into force after their accession.

During the first twenty years, the Federal Republic tried to isolate the GDR. After this goal seemed to be no longer feasible, the Federal Republic of Germany entered into the Basic Treaty with the German Democratic Republic to establish diplomatic relations and limited cooperation between the two German states. The Christian Democratic opposition in the Federal Republic rejected the treaty. The state of Bavaria even appealed to the Federal Constitutional Court asserting that the Basic Treaty violated the constitutional objective of re-unification.

The judgement of the Court on 31 July 1973 ruled that the Basic Treaty does not violate the constitution because it does not make a German re-unification impossible. In its judgement, the Court also declared:

The Basic Law – not only a thesis of international law doctrine and constitutional law doctrine! – assumes that the German Reich survived the collapse in 1945 and did not perish either with the capitulation or through the exercise of foreign state power in Germany by the Allied occupying powers or later ... This also corresponds to the established jurisdiction of the Federal Constitutional Court, to which the Senate adheres. The German Reich continues to exist ..., still possesses legal capacity, but is not itself capable of acting as an entire state for lack of organisation, in particular for lack of institutionalised organs. ... With the establishment of the Federal Republic of Germany, not a new West German state was founded, but a part of Germany was reorganised. ... The Federal Republic of Germany is therefore not the "legal successor" of the German Reich, but as a state identical with the state of the "German Reich", although "partially identical" with regard to its spatial extent, so that in this respect the identity does not claim exclusivity. The Federal Republic therefore does not encompass the whole of Germany as far as its constitutive people and its constitutive territory are concerned, irrespective of the fact that it recognises a uniform constitutive people of the subject of international law "Germany" (German Reich), to which its own population belongs as an inseparable part, and a uniform constitutive territory "Germany" (German Reich), to which its own territory belongs as a likewise inseparable part. In terms of constitutional law, it restricts its sovereign power to the "area of application of the Basic Law" ..., but also feels responsible for the whole of Germany (cf. Preamble of the Basic Law).

The Reichsbürger usually only cite the part that the German Reich survived the collapse. They remain silent on the Court's statement that the Federal Republic is identical to it. Therefore, many members of the Reichsbürger movement typically conclude that the German Reich still "exists" and that the Federal Republic of Germany is not an actual sovereign state but a corporation created by Allied nations after World War II.

Consequently, many Reichsbürger groups claim that they have restored the governmental bodies of the German Reich and now act as the official German government (of the German Reich). In practice, a group of Reichsbürger had a meeting that elected the office holders of the Reich (e.g., Reich chancellor, Reich President). As there are several of such groups, there are several people in Germany who claim these offices.

Some Reichsbürger groups maintain a different point of view. According to them, the Weimar constitution was not legitimate and therefore the older imperial constitution of 1871 is still in effect.

Still other groups have created, in their point of view, German sovereign states without historical precedent, for example a Kingdom of Germany or a regional entity. Other groups do not operate under the label of a 'restored' or new German state but call themselves simply Selbstverwalter (lit. 'someone who governs himself'). They reject the Federal Republic and claim that their house is a sovereign entity.

=== Antisemitism ===
According to the Federal Office for the Protection of the Constitution, some of the Reichsbürger groups and individuals hold antisemitic views. One example is the organization Geeinte deutsche Völker und Stämme, which was prohibited in March 2020. It promotes the idea that Jews and Muslims have no human rights nor a right to property.

A handbook of the Amadeu Antonio Stiftung holds that most views of the Reichsideologie have an antisemitic core. Usually the Reichsbürger use antisemitic codes, such as those from the Eastern Coast or the Rothschilds. Antisemitic conspiracy theories are attractive for the people in the Reichsbürger movement because they provide a simple explanation of the world by dividing humanity into friends and foes. A group of enemies of the people is made responsible for wars and poverty.

== Membership ==
In April 2018, Germany's domestic intelligence service, the Federal Office for the Protection of the Constitution (BfV), estimated that Reichsbürger movement membership had grown by 80% over the previous two years, more than estimated earlier, with a total of 18,000 adherents, of whom 950 were categorized as right-wing extremists. This marked an increase from BfV's 2016 estimate of 10,000 adherents and 2017 estimate of 12,600 adherents. The increase in numbers may be attributable to more adherents becoming known to authorities, rather than an actual increase in the number of adherents. The heterogeneity of the movement and its division into many small groups that are often independent of one another make it difficult to estimate the number of active Reichsbürger.

Reichsbürger adherents are scattered around Germany, but concentrated in the southern and eastern parts of the country, in the states of Brandenburg, Mecklenburg-Western Pomerania and Bavaria. BfV has estimated that there are 3,500 adherents in Bavaria and around 2,500 in Baden-Württemberg.

Adherents tend to be older, with most aged 40–60 years old and an average age of over 50. The majority are male and socially disadvantaged. The Amadeu Antonio Foundation, which monitors far-right activities in Germany, states that Reichsbürger adherents are "often isolated" and "completely cut off from reality". German counter-extremism official Heiko Homburg states that the Reichsbürger movement is an amalgamation of right-wing extremists, esoterics, and sovereign citizens, and that the movement attracts conspiracy theorists, the economically troubled, and "people who are a little mentally disordered".

== Activities ==
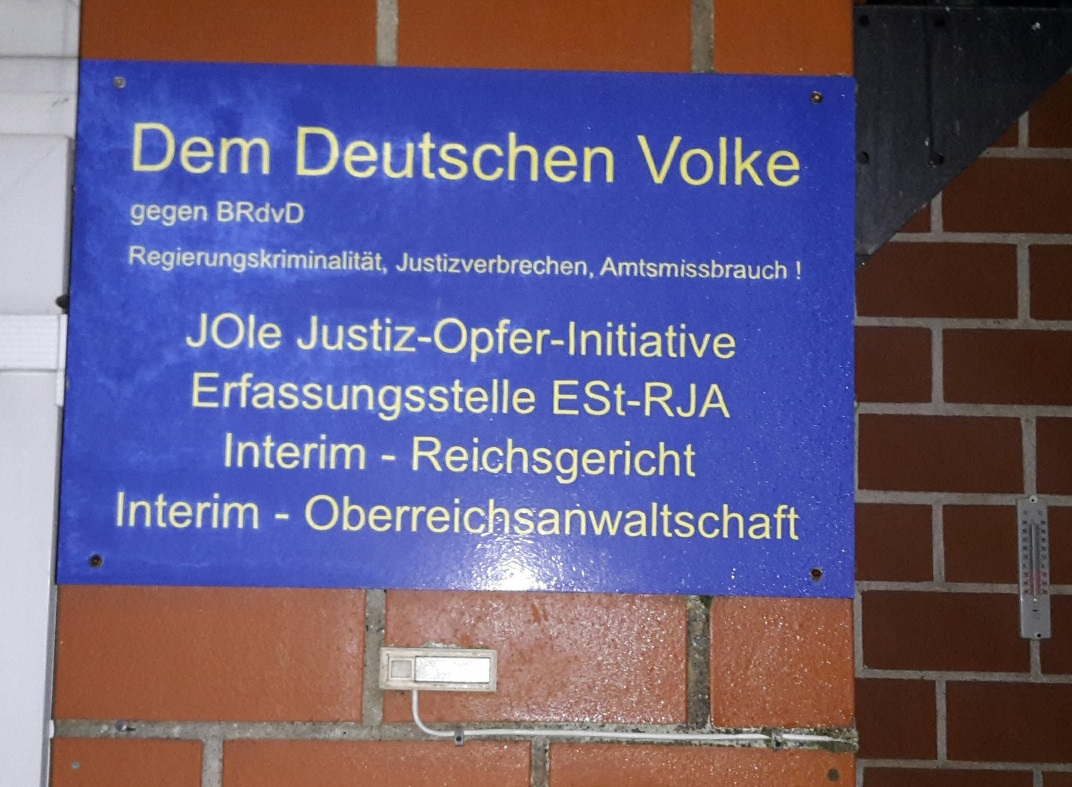
Sign at the entrance of the home of a supporter of the Reichsbürger Movement. It reads: "To the German People; against BRdvD (Federal Republic of (the) United Germany); Government criminality, Justice crimes, Official Abuse ! JOIe Justice-Victim-Initiative; Collection Center ESt-RJA; Interim - Supreme Court of the Reich; Interim - Office of the Attorney General of the Reich".

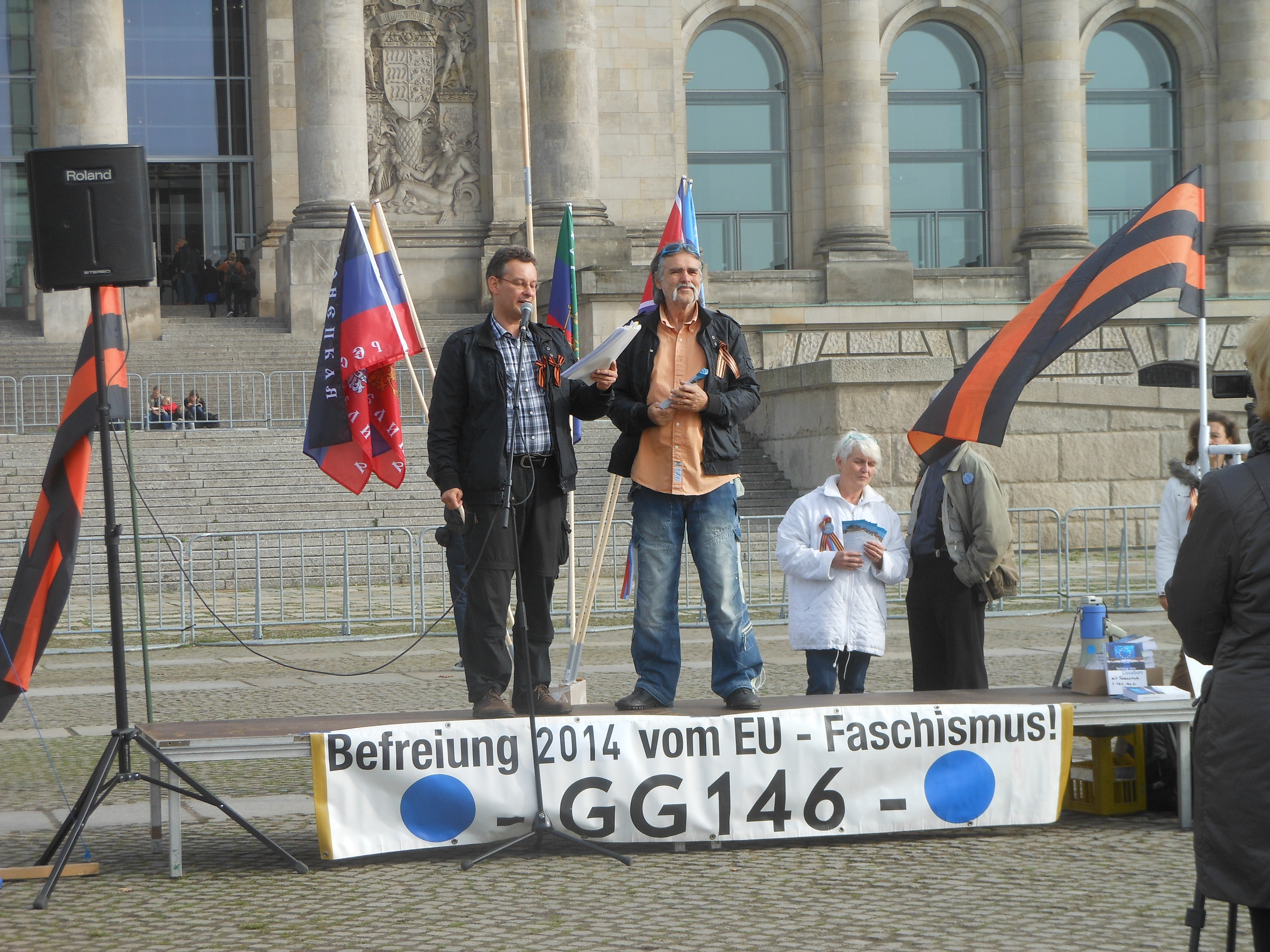
2014 demonstration in Berlin

As of 2009, there was no reliable count of the number of KRRs then existing, but the KRR FAQ, an online registry maintained by a German jurist, lists some 60 persons or organizations associated with operating competing KRRs. Several (though by no means all) KRRs have links to far-right extremist or neo-Nazi groups. The Federal Office for the Protection of the Constitution, Germany's federal domestic security agency, has monitored Reichsbürger since November 2016, and the security services of individual states have been monitoring the activities of the group for longer.

Some KRRs are ready to issue, for a fee, so-called official documents such as building permits, and driving licences, which their adherents may attempt to use in everyday life. In one instance, Wolfgang Ebel's KRR issued an "excavation permit" to the Principality of Sealand (a micronation), who then had men dig up a plot of land in the Harz region in search of the Amber Room for two weeks, until the landowner hired a private security service to drive them off. Similarly, in 2002 Ebel's KRR asserted that it had sold the Hakeburg, a manor in Kleinmachnow south of the Berlin city limits that had been owned by the German Reichspost (and therefore, according to Ebel, by his KRR) to one of the two competing governments of Sealand, thus creating, in their view, an enclave of Sealand in Germany.

KRR adherents have also on occasion refused to pay taxes or fines, arguing that the laws providing for such sanctions have no constitutional basis. In the ensuing judicial proceedings, they refuse to recognize the courts as legitimate. Some also pursue their activities abroad. In 2009, after Swiss authorities refused to recognize the so called Reich Driving Licence of a German KRR adherent, he unsuccessfully appealed the case up to the Federal Supreme Court of Switzerland.

Wolfgang Ebel's original organization, in particular, continues to attempt enforcing its asserted authority through attempts at intimidation. According to Ebel, his government has issued more than 1,000 arrest warrants against people who have disregarded documents issued by the KRR. These warrants inform the addressee that, once the Reich Government is in power, they will be tried for high treason, for which the penalty is death. Ebel has also admitted owning a government helicopter painted in the national colours, but has denied using it for intimidating fly-overs. Several attempts to prosecute Ebel for threats, impersonating a public servant and so forth have failed because, according to German prosecutors, all courts have found him to be legally insane.

== Violence by Reichsbürger activists ==
Flag of the German Empire flown by Adrian Ursache during the 2016 incident

In 2016, Adrian Ursache, a self-proclaimed Reichsbürger and the 1998 winner of the Mister Germany beauty contest, violently resisted his eviction from his house in Reuden. When the German police arrived on scene they encountered a group of around 120 people, who were staying on Ursache's and his in-law's property. Ursache deemed his property as part of the self-proclaimed State of Ur and flew the flag of the old German Reich above the home. After a first eviction attempt failed, the German police returned with a special response team the day after. When the eviction started, Ursache opened fire and injured two officers. Ursache was shot and rushed to a hospital. In 2019, Ursache was convicted of attempted murder and sentenced to 7 years in prison.

Also in 2016, in Georgensgmünd near Nuremberg, a self-described Reichsbürger fired on a special response unit of the Bavarian Police when they attempted to confiscate his 31 firearms. Three police officers were injured. One of them later died from his injuries. The weapons confiscation followed the revocation of the murderer's firearms permit and his repeated refusal to co-operate with local authorities. German authorities expressed concern at the escalation in violence. The event attracted international attention. Bavarian ministers called for increased surveillance of the right-wing extremist movement. On 23 October 2017, Wolfgang P. was sentenced to imprisonment for life.

In Höxter, North Rhine-Westphalia, in 2014, one Reichsbürger group (the Free State of Prussia) attempted to smuggle weapons into Germany in an attempt to create its own militia. Police raids have found large stockpiles of guns and ammunition hoarded by Reichsbürger adherents. In 2018, the German magazine Focus reported that Reichsbürger adherents had been attempting to build an armed militia in preparation for Day X—"an imagined day of reckoning or uprising against the German government".

In April 2022 four members of a Reichsbürger group called United Patriots (Vereinte Patrioten) were detained for plotting to overthrow the government. They planned to destroy electrical substations and power lines through bomb attacks to cause a nationwide power outage to create "civil war-like" conditions. Two members are also alleged to have been plotting to kidnap the German health minister Karl Lauterbach. Lauterbach was said to have been aware of the plans.

== Patriotic Union ==
Patriotic Union (Patriotische Union) or The Council (Der Rat) is the name of a German right-wing extremist Reichsbürger group. It aims is to establish a new government in Germany in the tradition of the German Empire of 1871. The gang wanted to provoke chaos and a civil war in Germany and thus take over power in the Federal Republic of Germany. Among other things, the German Bundestag was to be taken by force of arms, and killings would occur.

=== Aims ===
The group wanted to establish a new government (Council). Since November 2021 the network had been planning an armed attack on the Bundestag, as well as public arrests of politicians to cause public unrest. The Patriotic Union assumed that parts of the German security authorities would then have shown solidarity with the terrorist group, which would have led to an overthrow and the group would have taken power.

=== Members ===
Heinrich Reuss, a German aristocrat, is alleged to have led the group and been the planned head of state of the group.

The group, which comprised more than a hundred people, was divided into areas of responsibility. The Federal public prosecutor has 52 suspects and arrested 25 of them.

The gang also included several former members of the Special Forces Command (KSK), including a former Staff Sergeant of the Paratrooper Battalion of the Bundeswehr, Rüdiger von P. The GSG9 searched a KSK site of the Graf Zeppelin Barracks near Calw. Rüdiger von P. was supposed to lead the military arm of the group. The Federal Public Prosecutor describes von P. alongside Heinrich Reuss as a "ringleader". Von P. is said to have tried to recruit police officers and soldiers.

A lawyer and judge in the state of Berlin, Birgit Malsack-Winkemann, was designated as the future minister of Justice. Malsack-Winkemann was a member of the German Bundestag from 2017 to 2021 for the AfD and was arrested on 7 December 2022. The group included at least one other AfD politician, an AfD Stadtrat from Olbernhau in the Saxon Ore Mountains.

Other members were doctors and at least one was an entrepreneur.

=== 2022 investigations and arrests ===
German police authorities have been investigating the group since spring 2022. The group is also made up of parts of the radicalized German Querdenker movement, a heterogeneous group of COVID-19 protesters and deniers. Reuss was the starting point for the investigations, which ended up being carried out by the Federal Criminal Police Office (BKA) under the name Shadow. In addition, several state criminal investigation offices and state offices for the protection of the constitution were involved.

Over 3,000 police officers, including officers of the GSG 9 unit, searched more than 130 sites (including homes, offices, and storage facilities) throughout Germany, one of the largest anti-extremist raids in the nation's history. Searches of areas in Austria and Italy took place simultaneously. During the raids, coordinated by the Federal Police, 25 people were arrested out of a total of 52 suspected far-right coup plotters associated with the Reichsbürger movement. Those implicated in the suspected plot included active military personnel and policemen. Prosecutors stated that those arrested plotted an armed overthrow of the German government and the democratic constitution. The Patriotic Union group had stockpiled Iridium satellite telephones, expensive devices which could operate even if the electricity network was down. The General Federal Prosecutor Office said: "The arrested suspects belong to a terrorist organization which was founded by the end of November 2021 at the latest and which has set itself the goal of overthrowing the existing state order in Germany and replacing it with its own form of state, the outlines of which have already been worked out."

Those arrested included aristocrat Heinrich Reuss (who styles himself Heinrich XIII, Prince Reuss of Greiz), a then 71-year-old descendant of the House of Reuss, who owns an estate in Thuringia where the group met, several of his followers, and a then 69-year-old former Bundeswehr parachutist commander identified as Rüdiger von P. Also arrested was Birgit Malsack-Winkemann, a former Alternative for Germany (AfD) member of the Bundestag and a current judge.

== Police connections with Reichsbürger movement ==
There were renewed calls for more serious measures against the movement in 2016, including revocation of firearms permits and seizure of their weapons, following disciplinary action against police officers allegedly connected to the movement. On 27 October 2016, a Bavarian Police officer was suspended from duty because of his connections to one of the Reichsbürger movements. There have been allegations of similar kind against other police officers in different states of Germany as well.

== List of Reichsbürger groups ==
The following is a non-exhaustive list of KRRs that have received media coverage.

- Patriotic Union, a far-right group which plotted a coup in 2022.
- NeuDeutschland, later Königreich Deutschland based in Wittenberg. Founded in 2012, it claims 3,500 members. Led by self-proclaimed King of Germany Peter Fitzek till his arrest 2025.
- The Staatenbund of Austria was often compared to the Reichsbürgers, and even plotted their own coup attempt in 2017.
- “United German Peoples and Tribes” (GdVuSt) In March 2020, it became the first Reich Citizen organization to be banned nationwide. Nevertheless, its ideology remains highly influential within the movement. The group classified itself among the so-called “Soverein citizens” (Selbstverwalter). They sent out mass mailings of pseudo-decrees and threats to government agencies and courts. To this day, the GdVuSt ideology is emulated by various small successor groups and individuals who declare that they have “withdrawn” from the Germany.
- „staatenlos.info“ / „Kommission 146“ is a highly interconnected propaganda platforms of the "Reichsbürger" and conspiracy theory scene. The group centered around activist Rüdiger Hoffmann focuses heavily on the internet as well as on regular rallies (historically, primarily in front of the Reichstag in Berlin).
- Bismarcks Erben“ / Kollektive „Exilregierungen“ - a gathering for adherents of the classical, so-called "provisional Reich governments" (KRR).
- Fürstentum Germania, was a shortliving Micronation. Based at Krampfer Palace, established in early 2009 by Michael Freiherr von Pallandt, Frank Büntert and the conspiracy theorist Jo Conrad. On May 19, 2009—after only about three months—the property was cleared and sealed off by the authorities due to serious building code violations. Fürstentum Germania claims 300 adherents.
- Interim Partei – Das Reicht, established in 2006 organized as a minor political group with regional branches in several German states, including Baden-Württemberg, Hamburg, Hessen, Niedersachsen, and Schleswig-Holstein.
- Zentralrat Souveräner Bürger, based in an inn in Schwanstetten.
- State or Ur, based in Elsteraue. Its leader Adrian Ursache was injured in a 2016 shoot-out with police.
- Freistaat Preußen, an irredentist movement supporting the annexation of Kaliningrad from Russia. Based in Königsfeld, Rhineland-Palatinate and Bonn.

== See also ==
- Antisemitism in 21st-century Germany
- Inner emigration
- Racism in Germany
- Radical right (Europe)
- Free Saxons - Monarchist and regionalist political party operating in the German state of Saxony.
- Sedevacantism, traditional Catholic movement that considers all popes from at least John XXIII to be illegitimate.
- Sovereign citizen movement – a similar movement which is primarily active in the United States and Anglosphere countries, claiming in the U.S. that the Constitution is invalid since the Articles of Confederation have never formally been repealed.
- Freeman on the land movement – an offshoot of the sovereign citizen movement, it is active in Canada and other Anglosphere countries.
- Union of Slavic Forces of Russia – a similar movement with members and supporters in Post-Soviet Russia.
- Irish republican legitimism - similar movement in Ireland.
