= 2022 German coup d'état plot =

Plan to institute far-right monarchy

- Part of the Reichsbürger movement
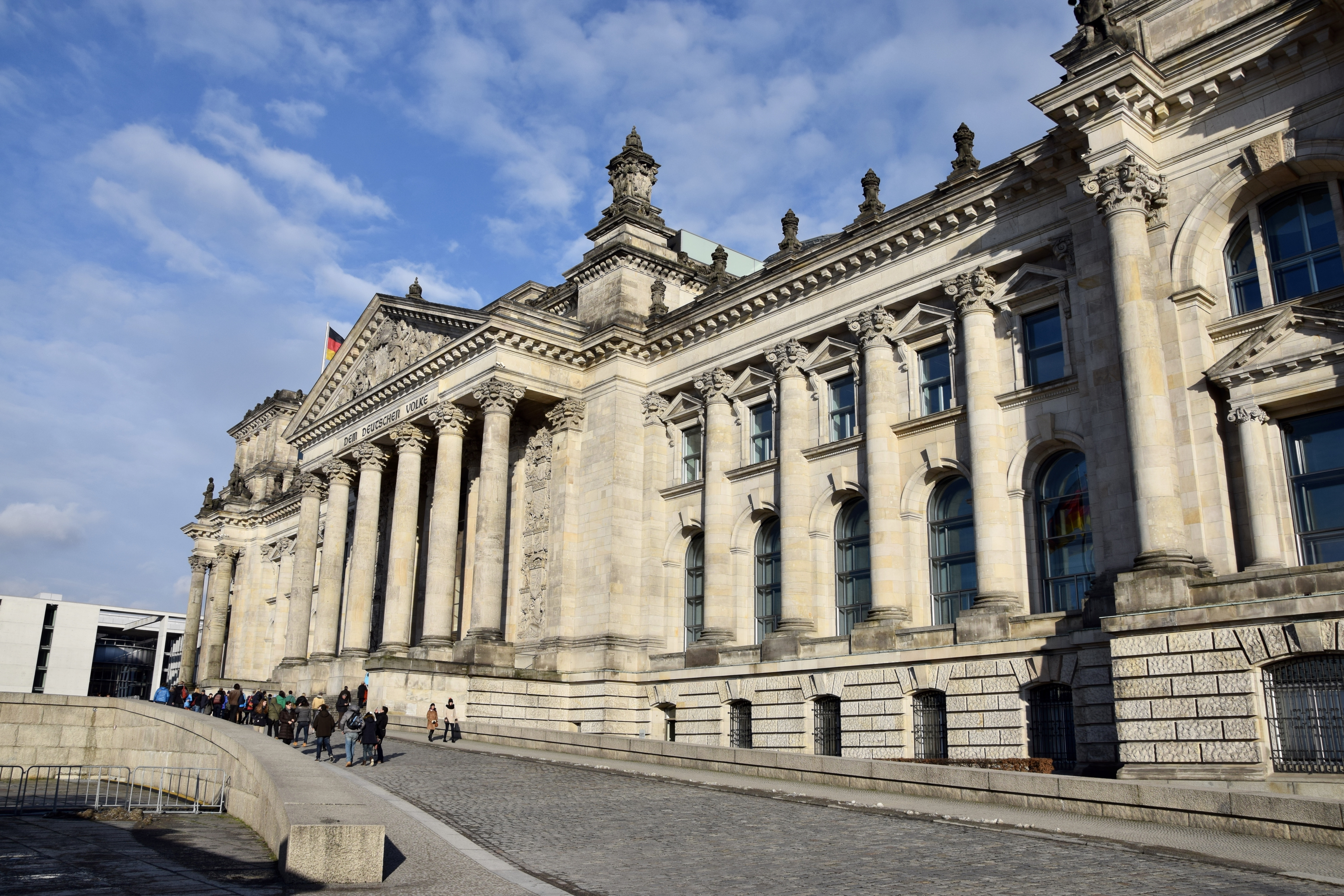
- The Reichstag, location of the Bundestag in Berlin, the main target of the alleged coup plot
- Location: Germany
- Goals: Removal of the current federal German government and establishment of a monarchy modelled on the German Empire
- Result: Plot foiled, arrests of alleged conspirators including Heinrich Prinz Reuss and Birgit Malsack-Winkemann

Parties
(Germany) German Government	Patriotische Union; QAnon followers; COVID-19 deniers

Units involved
Federal Criminal Police Office; Federal Police; GSG 9; Public Prosecutor General	

Number
3,000–5,000 German police and special forces	Around 50

Casualties
- Arrested: 25

On 7 December 2022, 25 members of a suspected far-right terrorist group were arrested for allegedly planning a coup d'état in Germany. The group, called Patriotic Union (German: Patriotische Union), which was led by a Council (German: Rat), was a part of the German far-right extremist Reichsbürger movement. The group aimed to re-establish a monarchist government in Germany in the tradition of the German Reich, with the government being similar to the German Empire. The group allegedly wanted to provoke chaos and a civil war in Germany so that it could take power.

Around 5,000 police officers, including 1,500 special forces officers, searched 130 locations throughout Germany and made several arrests, including Heinrich Prinz Reuss, a descendant of the former aristocratic House of Reuß, as well as former Alternative for Germany (AfD) MP Birgit Malsack-Winkemann. The group also included active military and police personnel. The operation against the group is considered to be the largest in Germany's history. The public prosecutor general, Peter Frank, declared the group to be a terrorist organisation.

Several regional courts (Oberlandesgericht) in Frankfurt am Main, Munich, Stuttgart, and possibly other elsewhere in Germany will hear the charges. The accused primary figures will be charged by the Federal Prosecutor General. In December 2023, charges of founding, joining, and supporting a terrorist organization were announced against 27 conspirators. A total of 69 people are considered defendants in the case.

== Members ==
Prosecutors reported that more than 50 organisers were Reichsbürger movement members, a cluster of far-right groups which reject the current liberal democratic basic order of Germany and are associated with violence and antisemitism. The plotters reportedly included QAnon followers and COVID-19 deniers. The group was divided into areas of responsibility. The Federal Public Prosecutor has 52 suspects and arrested 25 of them. Of those arrested, 23 remained in custody as of 14 December 2022.

The group also included several former members of the Special Forces Command (KSK), including a former lieutenant colonel of the Paratrooper Battalion of the Bundeswehr, Rüdiger von Pescatore. The GSG9 searched a KSK site of the Graf Zeppelin Barracks near Calw. Rüdiger von Pescatore was supposed to lead the "military arm" of the group. The Federal Public Prosecutor describes von Pescatore alongside Heinrich Prinz Reuss as a "ringleader". Von Pescatore is said to have tried to recruit police officers and soldiers. Members also included former Oberst Maximilian Eder, former criminal police officer Michael Fritsch from Hanover, and former Oberst Peter Wörner from Bayreuth, who started a business for survival training.

Malsack-Winkemann, a lawyer and judge in the state of Berlin, is said to have been designated as the future "minister of justice". She was a member of the German Bundestag from 2017 to 2021 for the AfD and was arrested on 7 December 2022. The group included at least one other AfD politician, Christian Wendler, an AfD former Stadtrat (local councillor) from Olbernhau in the Saxon Ore Mountains.

According to Der Spiegel, the "Patriotic Union" group had "an unusual amount of money" with which they had bought weapons as well as satellite phones. One of the properties raided by the police, hunting lodge Waidmannsheil in Bad Lobenstein, which belongs to alleged ringleader Prinz Reuss, serves as the business address for several companies linked to the London-based asset management firm Heinrich XIII. Prinz Reuß & Anderson & Peters Ltd.

== Ideology and aims ==
The alleged aim of the group was to reestablish the German Empire. The network is alleged to have been planning an armed attack on the Bundestag since at least November 2021, as well as public arrests of politicians to cause public unrest. The "Patriotic Union" assumed that parts of the German security authorities would then show solidarity with their effort, which would lead to an "overthrow" and allow the group to take power.

According to the group, liberation is promised by the imminent intervention of the "Alliance", a technically superior secret coalition of governments, intelligence services and militaries of various states, including Russia and the United States, according to the prosecutors.

The gang wanted to set up military units. In a confiscated document, the gang describes its purpose in detail: In addition to the "active surveillance of urban areas", they should also be responsible for the "neutralization of counter-revolutionary forces from the left and the Islamic spectrum" and for the "prevention of partisan activities".

When recruiting suitable candidates for Prince Reuss's inner circle, experts for paranormal phenomena (ESP) and astrologers were interviewed. Some candidates were said not to have passed an astrological test.

The group is known to be far-right, and regularly promotes anti-semitic ideology. The planned coup included a storming of the Reichstag, the German parliament building, inspired by the 6 January 2021 United States Capitol attack. Miro Dittrich of the Center for Monitoring, Analysis and Strategy (CeMAS) said that the Reichsbürger movement was not the first far-right group to have attempted a coup, but added: "Today's group, however, was larger, further along in the planning and better connected with people trained in the [use of] weapons".

== Investigations and arrests ==
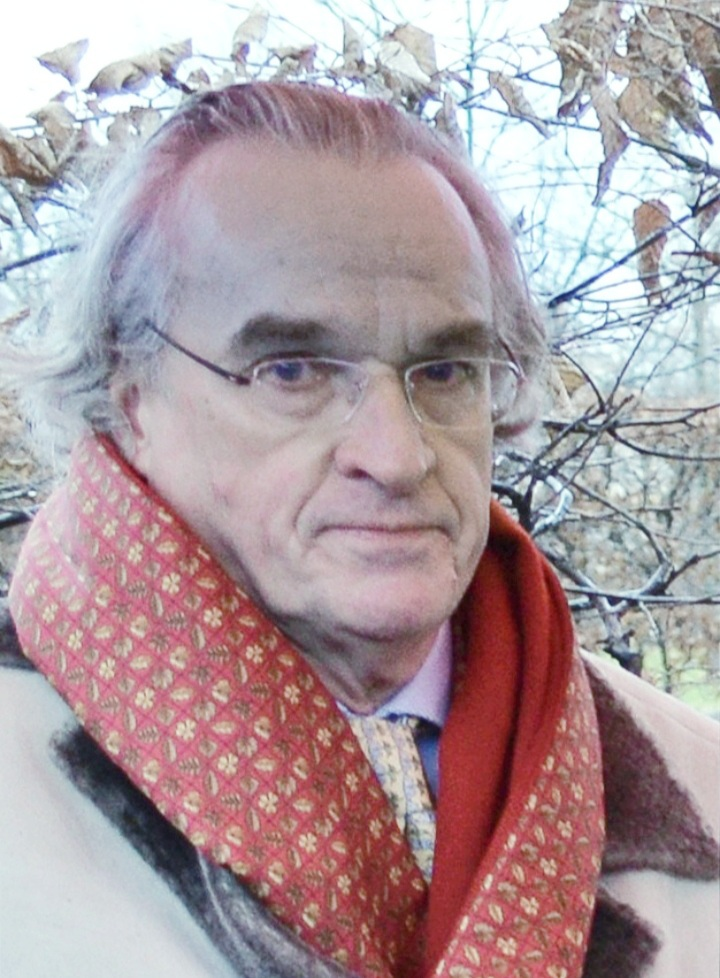
Heinrich Prinz Reuss, who is also self-styled as Prince Heinrich XIII, was among those arrested for alleged participation in the plot.

German police authorities began investigating the group in spring 2022. The group includes parts of the radicalised German Querdenken movement. Prinz Reuss was the starting point for the investigations, which were carried out by the Federal Criminal Police Office (BKA) under the name "Shadow". In addition, several state criminal investigation offices and state authorities for the protection of the constitution were involved. German authorities stated that the coup had been planned since November 2021 and would have been a violent, terroristic overthrow of the current government. Police had first learned about them in April 2022, when they arrested members of the so-called "United Patriots" who were said to have planned to abduct Karl Lauterbach, the federal minister of health of Germany during a talk show appearance. In September 2022 police surveillance started with the close monitoring of 52 suspects.

It was initially reported that around 3,000 police officers were involved in operations to arrest the conspirators; the total was later reported as around 5,000 police officers. The alleged conspirators mainly came from the southern German states of Bavaria and Baden-Württemberg but also included people in 9 other states, and also in Austria and Italy, where they were arrested by local law enforcement. Among those arrested were aristocrats, a former member of Parliament, and both former and active members of the military. "Vitalia B", the Russian life companion of Prinz Reuss, through whom he was able to secure interim financing from three Russian individuals, was also arrested. Frank Heppner, a celebrity chef, was arrested on 7 December. It is alleged that Heppner was a commander of the group's military wing responsible for recruitment, obtaining weapons and building a secure communications system. Heppner would also have supplied the group's troops with food after the successful coup.

Investigators secured "at least ten illegal guns", and found, in addition, 100 cartridges from the Bundeswehr as well as 94 various legal weapons including alarm pistols and knives.

The conspirators planned to co-operate with Russia, but the public prosecutor general reported on 7 December 2022 that from what they know so far, Russia did not "react positively" to the request: a spokesperson from the Russian Embassy in Berlin later denied any involvement, and the Russian government stated there could be no question of any Russian involvement in the far-right coup plot, with spokesman Dmitry Peskov saying that it "appears to be a German internal problem".

On 6 March 2025, 5 members of United Patriots were sentenced to between five years and nine months and eight years’ jail for their role in the plot.

== Reactions ==
=== Domestic ===
- Germany: Interior Minister Nancy Faeser announced that authorities would respond with the full force of the law "against the enemies of democracy".
- House of Hohenzollern: Georg Friedrich Prinz von Preussen, head of the House of Hohenzollern, the former ruling dynasty of the German Empire and of Prussia, condemned the coup plot in a press release: "It is with great concern that I read the media reports about the alleged coup plans of a terrorist organization. My family and I condemn any efforts directed against the free-democratic order of the Federal Republic of Germany"

=== International ===
- Russia: Kremlin spokesman Dmitry Peskov denied Kremlin involvement.
- United States: White House Press Secretary Karine Jean-Pierre announced that the government of the United States was ready to help the German government combat extremism.

== See also ==
- German Revolution of 1918–1919, transition of the German Empire into the Weimar Republic
- Kapp Putsch, 1920 coup attempt with similar motive
- Küstrin Putsch, 1923 coup attempt by the Black Reichswehr
- Beer Hall Putsch, 1923 coup attempt by the Nazi Party
- Oster conspiracy, 1938 political conspiracy to overthrow Adolf Hitler
- 20 July plot, 1944 coup attempt against the Nazi government
- Day X plot, 2017 alleged coup attempt by extremist elements of the Kommando Spezialkräfte
- Golpe Borghese, 1970 Italian neofascist coup attempt
- 2017 Austrian coup d'état plot, a similar plot by a similar group of sovereign citizens in Austria
