= Eliasch =

Eliasch is a surname. Notable people with the surname include:

- Amanda Eliasch (born 1960), English photographer, artist, poet and filmmaker
- Johan Eliasch (born 1962), Swedish businessman
