= Timeline of incidents involving QAnon =

A common logo used by QAnon followers

Since the movement's emergence in 2017, adherents of the QAnon far-right conspiracy theory have been involved in a number of controversial events, some of them violent, resulting in the filing of criminal charges and one conviction for terrorism.

== 2018 ==
=== Tucson cement plant incident ===
In May 2018, Michael Lewis Arthur Meyer livestreamed a Facebook video from the site of a Tucson cement plant, asserting, "This is a child sex trafficking camp that no one wants to talk about, that no one wants to do nothing about." The video was viewed 650,000 times over the ensuing week. Tucson police inspected the plant without finding evidence of criminal activity. Meyer then occupied a tower on the property for nine days, until reaching agreement with police to leave. He later returned to the tower in July, whereupon he was arrested for trespassing. Meyer referenced QAnon and the #WWG1WGA hashtag on his Facebook page.

=== Hoover Dam incident ===
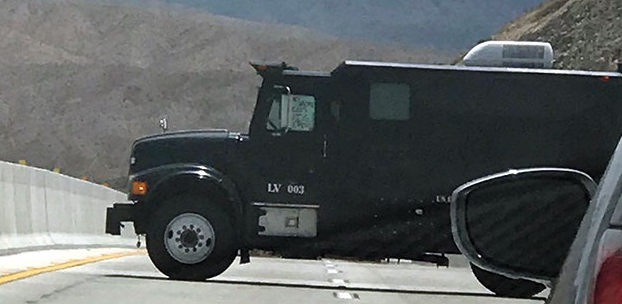
Matthew Wright's armored vehicle used to block the Mike O’Callaghan-Pat Tillman Memorial Bridge near the Hoover Dam on the Nevada-Arizona border

On June 15, 2018, Matthew Phillip Wright of Henderson, Nevada, was arrested on terrorism and other charges for driving an armored truck, containing an AR-15 and handgun, to the Hoover Dam and blocking traffic for 90 minutes. He said he was on a mission involving QAnon: to demand that the Justice Department "release the OIG report" on the conduct of FBI agents during the investigation into Hillary Clinton's use of a private email server. Since a copy of the Office of the Inspector General report had been released the day before, the man had been motivated by a Q "drop" which claimed the released version of the report had been heavily modified and that Trump possessed a more damning version but had declined to release it. In video recorded inside his armored truck, Wright expressed disappointment that Trump had not honored a "duty" to "lock certain people up", asking him to "uphold your oath".

After blocking traffic, Wright drove towards the Arizona side of the bridge, where his tires were flattened by police spike strips. He then surrendered to police after becoming stuck on a dirt road. Nobody was injured during the incident. At trial, Wright was found guilty, and on December 17, 2020, he was sentenced to seven years on a terrorism charge and nine months for unlawful flight, to be served consecutively.

=== Targeting of Michael Avenatti ===
On July 29, 2018, Q posted a link to Stormy Daniels's attorney Michael Avenatti's website and photos of his Newport Beach, California, office building, along with the message, "Buckle up!" The anonymous poster then shared the picture of a still unidentified man, appearing to be holding a cellphone in one hand and a long, thin object in the other, standing in the street near Avenatti's office, adding that a message "had been sent". This sparked an investigation by the Newport Beach Police Department. On July 30, Avenatti asked his Twitter followers to contact the Newport Beach Police Department if they "have any details or observed" the man in the picture.

=== Harassment of Jim Acosta ===
At a Trump rally in Tampa, Florida, on July 31, 2018, Trump supporters exhibited hostile behavior toward CNN chief White House correspondent Jim Acosta. Exponents of QAnon-related theories were at the rally.

The next day, David Martosko of the Daily Mail asked White House press secretary Sarah Huckabee Sanders whether the White House encouraged the support of "QAnon fringe groups". Sanders denounced "any group that would incite violence against another individual", without specifically responding to the QAnon mention. Sanders added that Trump "certainly doesn't support groups that would support that type of behavior".

== 2019 ==
=== Murder of James Wolfe ===
On January 8, 2019, a 26-year-old Seattle man stabbed his brother James Wolfe in the head with a 4-foot-long sword before calling 911 and confessing to the murder, saying he believed his brother was a lizard. During interrogation the man told detectives he saw lizards in the room and claimed that the detectives themselves were turning into lizards. The suspect had frequently posted about QAnon and had also pledged himself to the Proud Boys, though they denied any affiliation with him. The perpetrator claimed to have been diagnosed with schizophrenia, and a King County prosecutor described him as "severely mentally ill".

=== Grass Valley Charter School fundraiser ===
The Blue Marble Jubilee fundraising event at Grass Valley Charter School in Grass Valley, California, scheduled for May 11, 2019, was canceled as a precaution after a tweet by former FBI head James Comey on April 27 using the hashtag #FiveJobsIveHad, in which the first letters of the jobs were GVCSF, was interpreted by QAnon followers as a veiled reference to the Grass Valley Charter School Foundation, suggesting that Comey planned to stage a "false flag" terror attack at the event; the hashtag was also interpreted by QAnon adherents as an anagram of "five jihads", and the time stamp on the post was related to the 9/11 attacks. The police and the FBI received warnings, in addition to the school, which decided not to take the risk of Internet vigilantes attending "to guard the place", as a police sergeant put it.

=== Murder of Frank Cali ===
Anthony Comello of Staten Island, New York, was charged with the March 2019 murder of Gambino crime family underboss Frank Cali. According to his defense attorney, Comello had become obsessed with QAnon theories, believing Cali was a member of "deep state" and, "because of his self-perceived status in QAnon, Mr. Comello became certain that he was enjoying the protection of President Trump himself, and that he had the president's full support" to place Cali under citizen's arrest. Confronting Cali outside his home in Staten Island, Comello allegedly shot Cali ten times. At his first court appearance, Comello displayed QAnon symbols and phrases and "MAGA forever" scrawled on his hand in pen. Comello had also posted material on Instagram praising Fox News personalities such as Sean Hannity, Tucker Carlson and Jeanine Pirro. The reason why Cali was targeted was unclear, as the person behind QAnon's "drops" had not mentioned the Mafia.

=== America's Stonehenge vandalism ===
In September 2019, the America's Stonehenge tourist attraction in Salem, New Hampshire was found vandalized, with police saying the rock formation appeared to have been damaged by a power tool. In 2021, a man from Swedesboro, New Jersey was charged with vandalizing the monument. Police said the man carved "WWG1WGA" and his Twitter username into the stone.

=== Kidnapping incidents ===
In December 2019, Cynthia Abcug was arrested and charged in Colorado with conspiracy to commit second-degree kidnapping of one of her children who had been removed from her custody. Her other daughter reported to police that Abcug had been collaborating with an armed male who was "definitely part of this group QAnon", that her mother had gone to QAnon meetings and believed that the child had been taken by "evil Satan worshippers" and "pedophiles". Abcug pleaded not guilty to the charge in September 2020 and was tried in February 2021.

==== Later ====
On March 20, 2020, Neely Petrie-Blanchard was arrested and charged with kidnapping and custodial interference after taking her two daughters who had been in the sole legal custody of their grandmother. Petrie-Blanchard had made multiple social media posts promoting QAnon including memes and pictures of her wearing QAnon shirts at Trump rallies. She also has taken actions connected with the sovereign citizen movement, and had become actively involved with E-Clause, a QAnon-affiliated sovereign citizen pseudolaw firm.

In October 2020, Utah mother Emily Jolley abducted her son during a supervised visit, despite the fact that the boy's father had full custody of him. She had promoted QAnon conspiracy theories (including alleging that child protective services have been involved in human trafficking) and was a member of a Facebook page for E-Clause.

On April 13, 2021, a French group influenced by QAnon theories and by a local version of sovereign citizen ideology helped a non-custodial mother abduct her eight-year-old child from the child's grandmother, who had been awarded custody due to concerns over the mother's mental stability and extreme conspiratorial beliefs. The investigation about the people involved in the kidnapping eventually led to the uncovering of an alleged terrorist conspiracy.

=== Trump's 2020 campaign ===
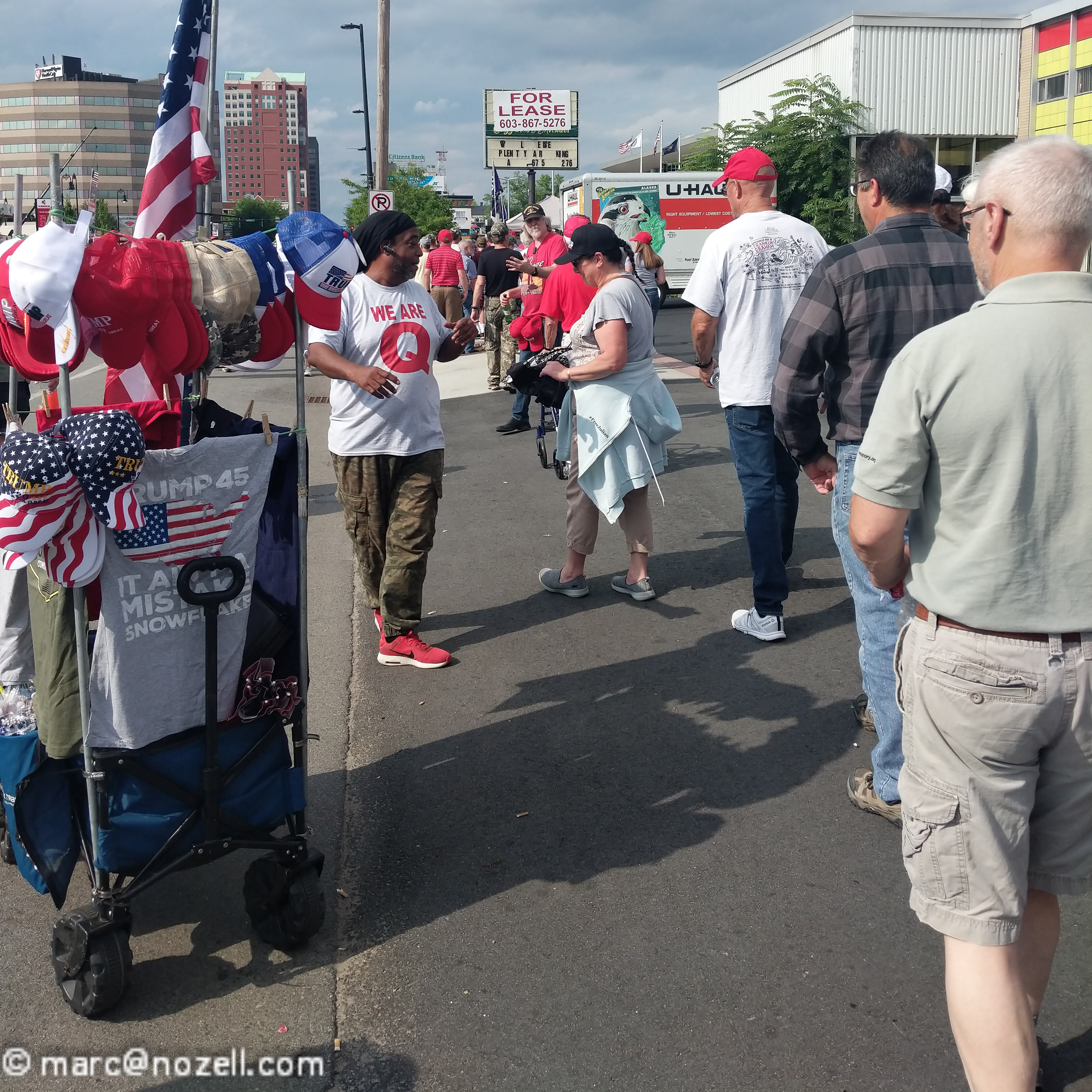
Man with a QAnon t-shirt selling merchandise at a Donald Trump rally

QAnon supporters claim that they were asked to cover up their "Q" identifiers and other QAnon-related symbols at a Trump campaign rally in Manchester, New Hampshire, on August 15, 2019. Although one person who was asked to turn his "Q" shirt inside out when he entered the rally identified the person who asked him to do so as a Secret Service agent, the agency denied this, saying in an email to The Washington Post, "The U.S. Secret Service did not request, or require, attendees to change their clothing at an event in New Hampshire." QAnon supporters also claimed that their visibility at Trump rallies had been suppressed for months.

In August 2019, a video posted online by "Women for Trump" late in July was reported to include "Q"s on two campaign signs. The first sign, which said "Make America Great Again", had a "Q" taped to it in the corner. The other side, "Women for Trump" had the "O"s in "Women" and "for" pasted over with "Q"s. The images which included the altered signs were clearly taken at a Trump campaign rally, which have increasingly attracted adherents of the QAnon conspiracy theory, so it is unknown if those particular signs were selected for inclusion deliberately or not. The video has since been taken down.

==== 2020 and later ====
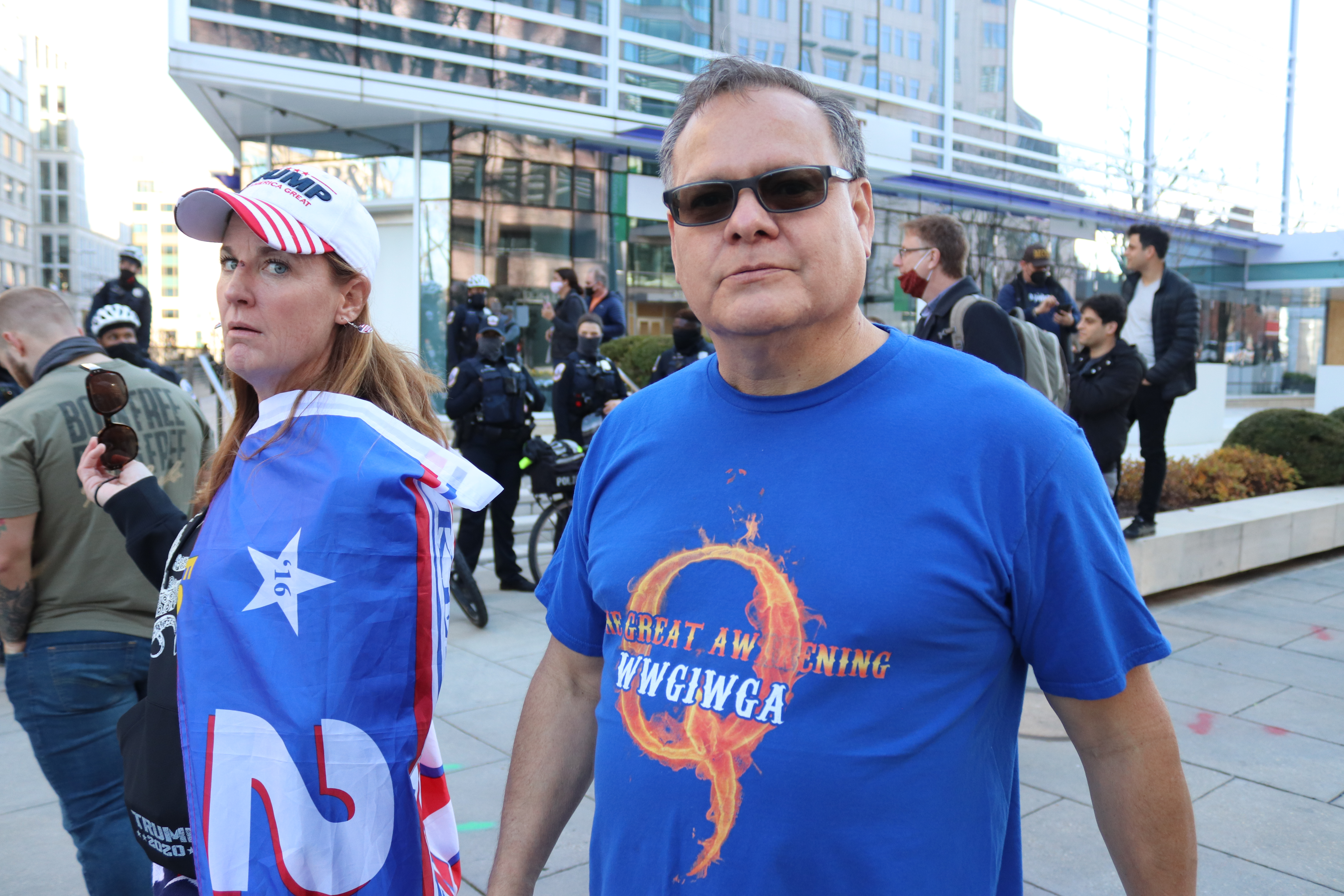
Protester wearing a QAnon t-shirt at a Proud Boys march for Trump in December 2020.

In July 2020, Business Insider reported that according to Media Matters for America, Trump's reelection campaign relied on a network of QAnon-related accounts to spread disinformation and propaganda on social media, especially Twitter. An analysis of 380,000 tweets sent between early April and the end of May 2020, and another of the most popular words used by 1,000 accounts, showed that the QAnon network "is playing a key role in generating and spreading Trump's propaganda".

The Washington Post reported at the beginning of August 2020 that adverts for Trump's campaign had shown images of supporters with prominent QAnon merchandise. Thousands of comments on YouTube saw these details as signs of victory.

The New York Times wrote that QAnon adherents had been shaken by Trump's defeat in the 2020 presidential elections, following years of reassurance that Trump would win by a landslide. Some followers repeated unsubstantiated claims that there had been widespread voter fraud and that Trump had actually been reelected, while others began to accept Biden's victory. On the day of Biden's inauguration, participants on 8kun differed in their views on the future of their cause. Ron Watkins, a former 8kun administrator and major figure in spreading QAnon, suggested it was time to "go back to our lives as best we are able" and "as we enter into the next administration please remember all the friends and happy memories we made together over the past few years." A board moderator deleted the Q message history and was threatened with death after the content was restored by others. Some suggested that Biden was "part of the plan".

In February 2021, Media Matters published analysis finding that QAnon adherents were praising the recent 2021 Myanmar coup d'état, in which the military overthrew the democratically elected government, and advocating a similar coup in the United States. In May 2021, a conference called "For God & Country: Patriot Roundup" was organized in Dallas, Texas by influencer John Sabal (also known as "QAnon John") and his girlfriend. Though Sabal claimed that it was not a "QAnon conference", multiple high-profile QAnon figures took part in the event, including lawyers L. Lin Wood and Sidney Powell – both of whom had been involved in Trump's attempts to overturn the 2020 election – and General Michael Flynn. When an audience member said, "I want to know why what happened in Myanmar can't happen here", Flynn responded, "No reason. I mean, it should happen here. No reason. That's right." After his words were reported, Flynn asserted he had "not at any time called for any action of that sort" and accused the press of "boldface fabrication based on twisted reporting". He had suggested in December 2020 that Trump should suspend the Constitution, silence the press, and hold a new election under military authority.

At the same conference, Powell falsely asserted that Trump "can simply be reinstated, that a new Inauguration Day is set", eliciting cheers from the crowd. Two days after Powell's remarks, Maggie Haberman of The New York Times tweeted that Trump "has been telling a number of people he's in contact with that he expects he will get reinstated by August."

== 2020 ==
=== Tintagel flag ===
QAnon flag flown at the Camelot Castle hotel near to Tintagel Castle

In January 2020, John Mappin (also affiliated with Turning Point UK) began to fly a Q flag at the Camelot Castle hotel near to Tintagel Castle. Advocacy group Hope not Hate said, "Mappin is an eccentric figure, considered outlandish even by his fringe rightwing peers. This childish ploy is a weak attempt at getting attention for himself and his marginal Turning Point UK organisation, and is better off being ignored."

=== Eduardo Moreno arrest ===
In April 2020, Eduardo Moreno, a 44-year-old locomotive engineer, intentionally derailed a moving train near to the USNS Mercy when the ship was docked in the Port of Los Angeles. Moreno believed the hospital ship was being used for nefarious purposes, and he wanted to "wake people up." In April 2022, Moreno was sentenced to three years in prison.

=== Austin Steinbart arrest ===
In April 2020, QAnon influencer Austin Steinbart, also known as "Baby Q" or "Baby QAnon", who claimed that he was a secret agent working for Trump and that Q was his own time-travelling future self, was arrested by the FBI on an extortion charge. Steinbart had hacked into the records of a California-based medical facility, obtained private information about celebrity patients and threatened the facility to leak the information. His followers had also been harassing a technology firm which had deleted some of his files on copyright grounds. Court documents described Steinbart as a young man with "unaddressed behavior or mental health issues", willing to break the law to build up his status as a conspiracy theorist. Steinbart pleaded guilty and was released for time served in April 2021.

=== Jessica Prim arrest ===
In April 2020, Jessica Prim was arrested carrying several knives after live-streaming her attempt to "take out" presidential nominee Joe Biden. Prim was arrested in New York City on a pier where she appeared to have been trying to get to the U.S. Navy Hospital Ship Comfort. QAnon claimed the ship was used by a cabal of pedophiles. During her arrest, Prim was reportedly shown crying and asking police, "Have you guys heard about the kids?"

Before her arrest, Prim posted on Facebook that Hillary Clinton and Biden "need to be taken out" and that "Hillary Clinton and her assistant, Joe Biden and Tony Podesta need to be taken out in the name of Babylon! ... I can't be set free without them gone. Wake me up!!!!!"

Prim's Facebook page was filled with references to QAnon. She encouraged her Facebook followers to check out QAnon "clues". In a video posted just hours before her arrest, Prim ranted about the "Frazzledrip" video which supposedly depicted Hillary Clinton and her aide Huma Abedin murdering a child.

=== Intrusion into Justin Trudeau's residence ===
On July 2, Corey Hurren, a Canadian Army reservist and sausage-making business owner, rammed a truck through the gates of Rideau Hall, the temporary residence of Canadian prime minister Justin Trudeau. Hurren, who carried a gun, was arrested 13 minutes later. He had published QAnon-related content and hashtags on his company's Instagram feed. At the time of his arrest, he told officers that his goal had been to "make a statement" to Trudeau by showing up during one of his daily media briefings.

At his trial, Hurren pleaded guilty to seven weapons-related charges and one charge of mischief, and explained that he had wanted to "arrest" Trudeau over the COVID-19 restrictions, which he said were damaging his business, and over the federal ban on assault-style firearms. The court commented that Hurren had committed a "politically motivated, armed assault" to intimidate the government, showed no remorse and had not renounced his beliefs in conspiracy theories. In March 2021, he was sentenced to six years in prison and a lifetime firearm ban.

=== Misinformation about wildfires ===
As wildfires spread across large parts of the Western U.S. in September 2020, false rumors spread on social media that antifa activists were setting fires and preparing to loot property that was being evacuated. Some residents refused to evacuate based on the rumors, choosing to defend their homes from the supposed invasion. Authorities pleaded with residents to ignore the false rumors. A firefighters' union in Washington state described Facebook as "an absolute cesspool of misinformation" on the topic. QAnon followers participated in the misinformation, with one false claim that six antifa activists had been arrested for setting fires amplified by Q specifically. Days earlier, Trump and Attorney General Bill Barr had amplified false social media rumors that planes and buses full of antifa activists were preparing to invade communities, allegedly funded by George Soros.

=== Pennsylvania mail carrier arrest ===
On October 12, 2020, special agents with the United States Postal Service's Office of Inspector General raided the Baldwin, Pennsylvania home of a mail carrier from the Mount Oliver post office. Agents found eight garbage bags of undelivered mail outside the home. The undelivered mail included one application for a mail-in ballot, but no ballots. The mail carrier had posted about QAnon and Pizzagate on Facebook.

=== 2020 presidential election ===
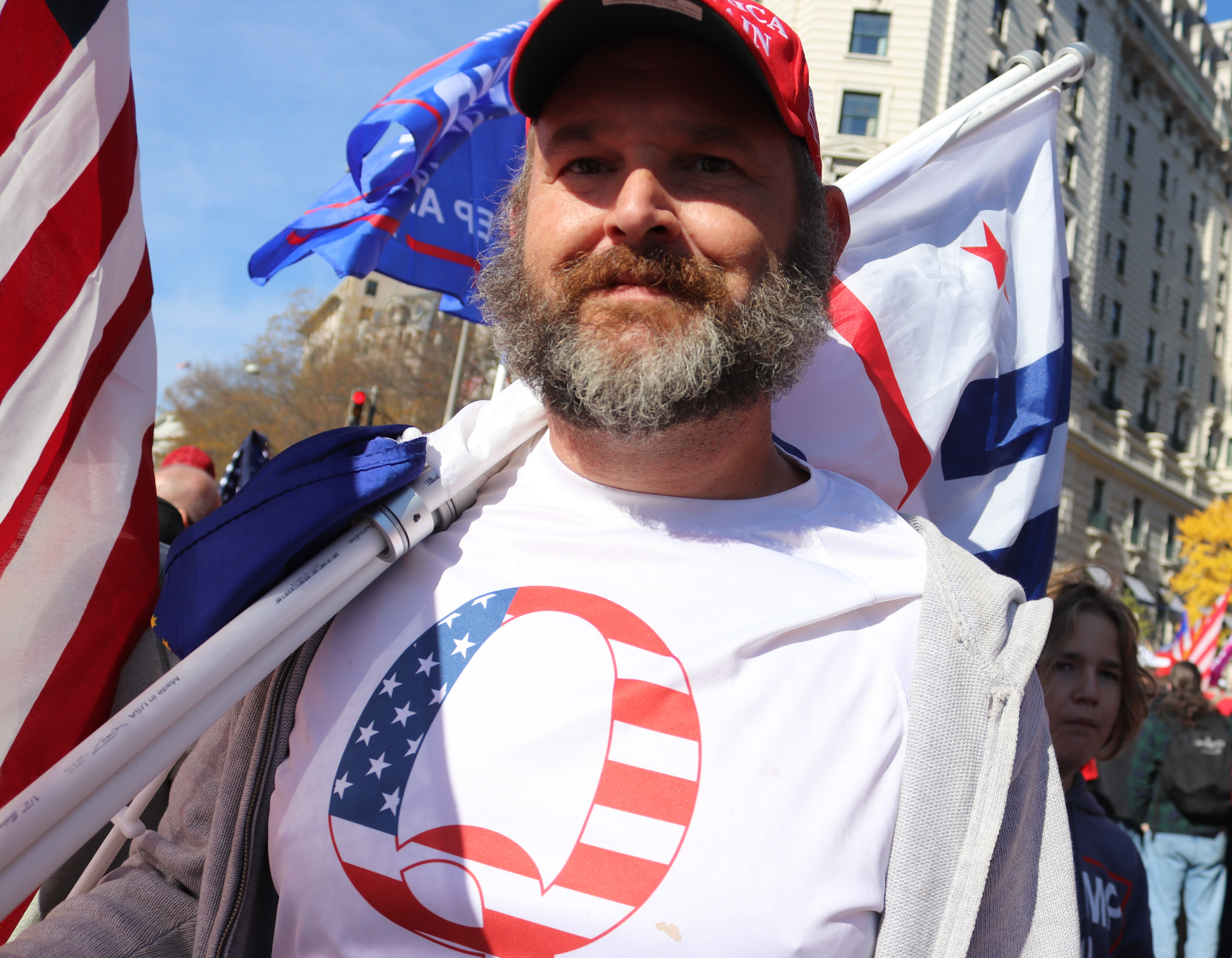
A pro-Trump protester wearing a t-shirt emblazoned with a common QAnon logo, at the "Stop the Steal" rally on November 14, 2020

Near Philadelphia's Convention Center, where mail-in ballots were being counted, two men from Virginia were taken into custody based on a tip of a threat of an attack with AR-15s. Bumper stickers on their truck referenced QAnon.

As unsubstantiated allegations of voting fraud spread following Trump's defeat in the election, QAnon followers advanced a hoax that voting machines made by Dominion Voting Systems had deleted millions of Trump votes. The hoax was repeated on the far-right cable news outlet One America News Network, and Trump tweeted about it. The Cybersecurity and Infrastructure Security Agency announced that the election was the most secure in American history, with "no evidence that any voting system deleted or lost votes, changed votes or was in any way compromised".

Based on a false interpretation of the District of Columbia Organic Act of 1871, according to which it transformed the federal government into a corporation and rendered illegitimate every president elected thereafter, some QAnon adherents believed that the 18th president (Ulysses S. Grant, who was in office 1869–1877) was the last legitimate president. They believed that Trump would be sworn in as the 19th president on March 4, 2021, the original inauguration date until the Twentieth Amendment changed it to January 20 in 1933, and that he would restore the federal government. This claim was developed by the sovereign citizen movement. Based on intelligence that an identified but undisclosed militia group might attempt an attack on the Capitol on that date, the U.S. Capitol Police issued an alert on March 3. House leadership subsequently rescheduled a March 4 vote to the previous night to allow lawmakers to leave town. However, Newsweek reported a recent skepticism towards the March 4 idea developing among QAnon adherents, who rescheduled the purported date of Trump's re-inauguration to March 20, the 167th anniversary of the founding of the Republican Party.

In Philadelphia, 44-year-old Joshua Macias and 63-year-old Antonio Lamotta of Virginia drove a Hummer—emblazoned with a QAnon sticker—to the Pennsylvania Convention Center, where votes were being counted for the election. Police arrested the two and searched the SUV, which was loaded with handguns and a rifle. The two were convicted on weapons charges in 2023. Lamotta was also charged in connection with the January 6 riot.

=== Henderson apartment shooting ===
On November 3, 38-year-old Jason Neo Bourne (who had renamed himself after the characters Jason Bourne and Neo) opened fire at his neighbor's apartment in Henderson, Nevada, killing the mother and the family's housekeeper and paralyzing the teenage daughter. He then kidnapped the 12-year-old son and brought him to the parking lot, where the boy was shot and killed as police approached. Bourne was killed by police shortly after. An investigation of his computer found he "strongly believed in QAnon theories".

=== Murder of Chris Hallett ===
On November 15, Christopher "Chris" Hallett, a sovereign citizen ideologue who operated the pseudolaw firm E-Clause, was murdered by one of his associates, Neely Petrie-Blanchard, a non-custodial mother who had kidnapped her children in January of the same year. Hallett advertised his services through a social media community of conspiracy theorists which included QAnon supporters like Petrie-Blanchard as well as flat earthers, though according to his family he did not share those beliefs himself. E-Clause had notably associated with a QAnon group calling itself the Pentagon Pedophile Task Force.

Petrie-Blanchard, who had relied on E-Clause to win back custody of her children, started out as a client and later worked for the firm; she had ultimately come to believe that Hallett was involved in the government conspiracy against her. In April 2024, Petrie-Blanchard was sentenced to life in prison.

=== Oregon State Capitol breach ===
On December 21, over a hundred protesters, some of whom were armed, entered the Oregon State Capitol to protest COVID-19 policies. The protesters included members of the Proud Boys, Patriot Prayer, and supporters of QAnon. One man who had attempted to break in assaulted two reporters, while another fired a chemical irritant at police officers. In 2021 Oregon State Representative Mike Nearman, who was seen on surveillance footage letting some of the protesters in through a side door, was expelled from the House in a 59–1 vote, with the only vote to stay coming from Nearman himself. Nearman pled guilty to first-degree official misconduct later that year.

== 2021 ==
=== Participation in the January 6 United States Capitol attack ===
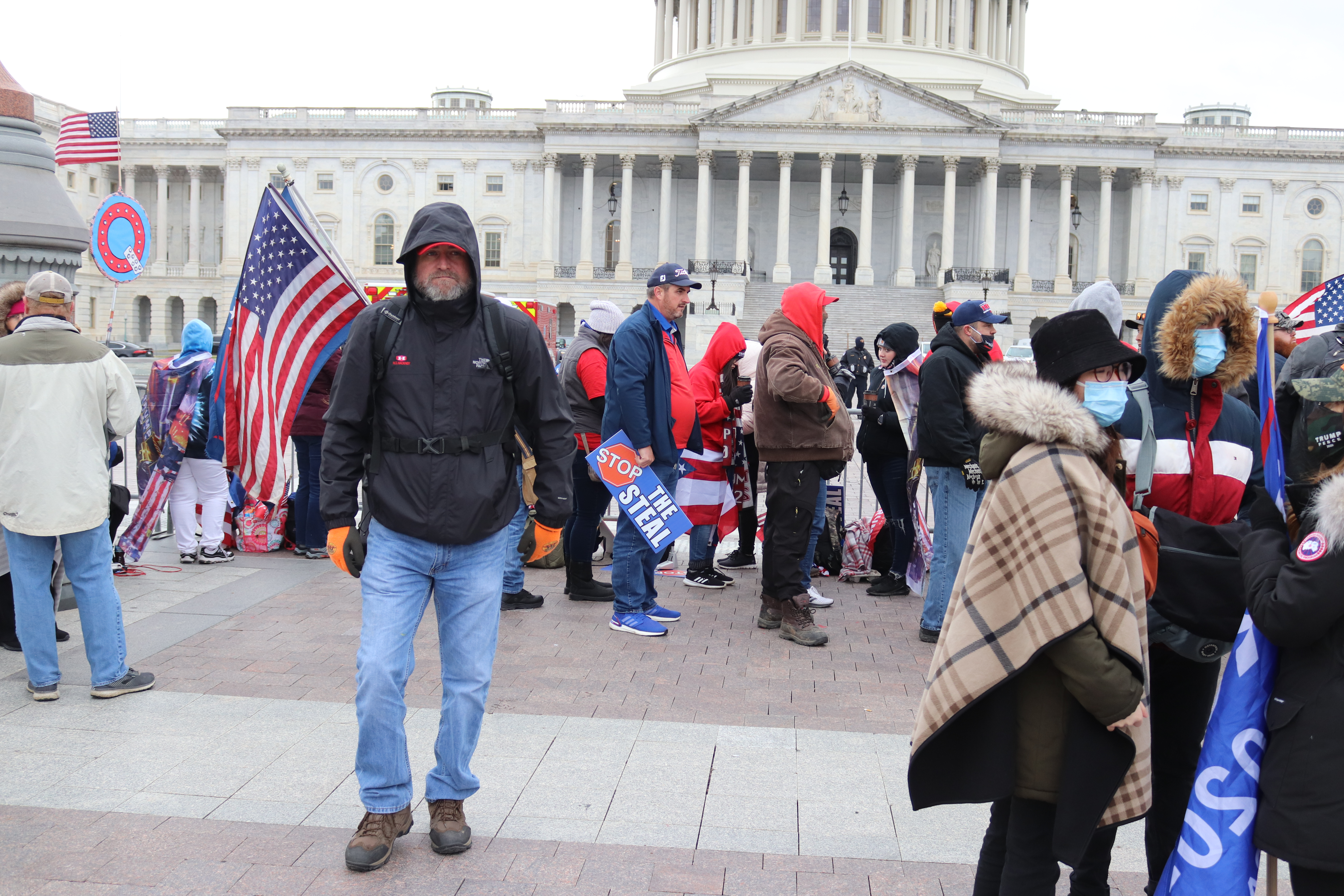
A QAnon emblem (upper left) is raised during the 2021 United States Capitol attack.

Various QAnon-affiliated protesters participated in the attack on the United States Capitol building on January 6, 2021. Rioters were either seen wearing clothing with Q-related emblems or identified as QAnon followers from video footage.

Ashli Babbitt, a rioter who was shot dead by police as she was trying to get into the Speaker's Lobby, was an adherent of QAnon. On the day of the attack, she had retweeted a message from conspiracy theory attorney L. Lin Wood which called for the immediate resignation of Mike Pence, Rod Rosenstein and John Roberts and for the indictment of the first two. One of the most notable participants in the riots was Jake Angeli, whose presence was widely reported by the media because of his "shamanic" attire and war paints. Angeli, also known as the "QAnon Shaman", was a known QAnon supporter who had participated in various protests. On January 12, Facebook and Twitter announced that they were removing "Stop the Steal" content and suspending 70,000 QAnon-focused accounts, respectively. On April 19, 2021, the Soufan Center reported that Russia and China had amplified and "weaponized" QAnon stories around the time of the attack "to sow societal discord and even compromise legitimate political processes."

=== Portland courthouse shooting ===
On January 8, a 39-year-old man allegedly fired five shots at a federal building in Portland, Oregon. No injuries were reported. The suspect had posted QAnon theories on his YouTube channel and was arrested at a "Stop the Steal" rally in Salem two days prior.

=== Middlesbrough attempted murder ===
On January 18, Middlesbrough, England man Anthony Beckett attacked his pregnant wife with a hammer while she was washing her hair in a bathtub. The victim escaped and ran into the street to call for help. Beckett was obsessed with the 2020 election, had posted QAnon theories about the COVID-19 pandemic, and believed the U.S. and Chinese governments were after him and that only President Trump could save him.

=== Interruption of Ghislaine Maxwell court hearing ===
On January 19, 2021, a hearing on the unsealing of documents related to a settled Ghislaine Maxwell civil defamation suit with Virginia Roberts Giuffre was interrupted after it was discovered that someone present was unlawfully streaming the proceedings on YouTube. The unauthorized stream reached approximately 14,000 viewers, including a contingent of QAnon supporters, before it was shut off after the judge warned the room.

=== Murder of Jessica Burke ===
On January 27, 2021, 45-year-old Troy Burke shot and killed his wife Jessica Burke at their Elwell, Michigan home. Court records stated Troy Burke believed he was getting messages from QAnon circles telling him to kill his wife, and that his wife was a "transgender offspring of President Joe Biden" and "CIA-linked child sex trafficker". He was found not guilty by reason of insanity in 2022.

=== Wisconsin Army Reserve Center Incident ===
On March 15, 2021, Ian Alan Olson drove to an Army Reserve center in Pewaukee, Wisconsin and shouted "This is for America" before firing two paintball rounds at nearby reservists. On November 18, Olsen was sentenced to 14 months in federal prison.

=== Liliana Carrillo Killings ===
On April 10, 2021, Liliana Carrillo killed her children, Joanna, 3; Terry, 2; and Sierra, 6 months. Carrillo, who suffered from depression, had become deeply involved in QAnon-based conspiracy theories.

=== Murder of Ralph Mendez ===
On May 12, 2021, 44-year-old Rory Banks broke into the Wheatland, California home of Ralph Mendez, 55, and shot him to death, before calling 911 on himself. Mendez, a registered sex offender, was written on a list that included three other sex offenders who lived in Wheatland, and prosecutors said Banks planned to kill all of them. Banks believed heavily in QAnon and had a Q sticker on the back of his vehicle. His attorney argued an insanity defense, but he was convicted of murder.

=== Matthew Taylor Coleman killings ===
On August 12, 2021, a follower of QAnon and a father of two was charged with murdering his two children, a two-year-old son and ten-month-old daughter, with a spearfishing gun in Mexico. The suspect, identified as 40-year-old Matthew Taylor Coleman, fled back to U.S. after the murders and was arrested there. He claimed that he was "enlightened" by QAnon and other alleged delusions that his wife carried and passed on "serpent DNA" to his kids, which compelled Coleman to take them to Mexico and murder them to prevent them from growing into monsters. Coleman is in a Californian prison pending trial for the killings. On October 13, 2023, a judge ruled that Coleman couldn't stand trial.

=== Rémy Daillet-Wiedemann case ===
Rémy Daillet-Wiedemann, a French far-right conspiracy theorist living in Malaysia, adapted QAnon theories for a French audience and published online videos in which he called for an overthrow of the French government. In June 2021, he was expelled from Malaysia, deported back to France and put under arrest for his involvement in the kidnapping of a child who had been removed from the care of her conspiracy theorist mother. Daillet-Wiedemann had helped coordinate the abduction from Malaysia.

In October 2021, Daillet-Wiedemann was charged with running a terrorist organization after it emerged that he and his Internet followers—who included members of a neo-Nazi group had been seriously planning to carry out the coup he advocated against the French government. Several associates of Daillet-Wiedemann were also arrested. Besides the coup attempt, the group had planned other violent actions, including attacks against COVID-19 vaccination centers, masonic lodges, public figures and 5G antennas. In March 2022, seven other people were interrogated by the police for their involvement in Daillet-Wiedemann's network. In October 2026, Daillet-Wiedemann was sentenced to six years in prison; his 14 co-defendants also received prison sentences.

=== Death threats against Canadian healthcare workers ===
Romana Didulo, a QAnon-affiliated, Philippines-born conspiracy theorist residing in British Columbia and styling herself as the "Queen of Canada", built an online following in the course of 2021 and caused her community to harass Canadian businesses, governments and police forces with hundreds of "cease and desist" notices demanding that they stop their activities related to combating the COVID-19 pandemic. Didulo eventually called on her 73,000 Telegram followers to "shoot to kill" all healthcare workers administering COVID-19 vaccines to children under 19. On November 27, a search warrant was issued against her; she was apprehended the same day and taken to a hospital for a mental health assessment. She was later released.

== 2022 ==
=== National Butterfly Center incident ===
After a QAnon-related conspiracy theory spread on social media that the National Butterfly Center was smuggling immigrants into the U.S., in late January 2022 two people visited the center referring to "the rafts with the illegal crossing" and to child rape, then reportedly injured the director, Marianna Trevino Wright, and almost struck her son with their vehicle. In response, the center closed for three days the following weekend as a precaution during the We Stand America rally nearby, and announced on February 3, 2022, that it would be closed indefinitely for "the safety of our staff and visitors".

=== Freedom Convoy 2022 ===
The Freedom Convoy 2022 (French: Convoi de la Liberté) was a protest in Canada against COVID-19 vaccine requirements for truckers to re-enter the country by land introduced by the Government of Canada on January 15, 2022. The trucking convoys were then joined by pedestrian protesters.

One of the lead organizers of the convoy, James Bauder, has previously stated support for QAnon, endorsed conspiracy theories around the COVID-19 pandemic and the 2020 U.S. presidential election, and called for the arrest of Prime Minister Justin Trudeau for alleged treason. On February 3, 2022, Romana Didulo joined the convoy with supporters.

=== Break-in at a Tokyo vaccination center ===
A Japanese QAnon-affiliated group called YamatoQ waged an online disinformation campaign against the COVID-19 vaccine rollout in Japan, claiming that the coronavirus did not exist and that vaccinations were part of a plan to decrease the population through the administration of harmful substances. Its members were recruited through social media.

On April 7, 2022, twelve members of YamatoQ trespassed into a Shibuya health care clinic that provided COVID-19 vaccine shots; four of them were immediately arrested by officers from the Tokyo Metropolitan Police Public Security Bureau.

The group's leader, a former V-Cinema actor named Hiroyuki Kuraoka, was arrested on April 20. He was sentenced by the Tokyo District Court on December 22, 2022, with four other YamatoQ members for trespassing on various vaccination sites.

In June 2022, YamatoQ announced that they would create Eden-based communes. In November 2022, pro-YamatoQ influencer Daisuke Murai was arrested for allegedly misappropriating money from unemployment benefits and donations for personal expenses. During Murai's first trial at the Osaka District Court on March 17, 2023, Murai denied the charges and claimed that the arrests are done to suppress the anti-vaccine movement. On March 15, 2024, Murai was found guilty of the charges and was sentenced to one year and six months in prison.

Officers from the Shizuoka Prefectural Police and the Yaizu Police Station arrested YamatoQ members for supposedly trespassing on a COVID-19 vaccination site in Yaizu, Shibuya. Shizuoka Prefectural Police launched a raid on the office of YamatoQ on December 5, 2022.

=== Attempted "arrest" of Peterborough police officers ===
On August 10, Romana Didulo called on her Telegram followers to "arrest" the police forces of Peterborough, Ontario, for enforcing COVID-19 restrictions. Three days later, about 40 of Didulo's followers demonstrated in front of the Peterborough Police station and, after listening to a speech from Didulo, attempted to perform a citizen's arrest of the police officers, whom they accused of "COVID crimes". They were not allowed to enter the police station. Six of the demonstrators ended up being arrested; two of them were charged with assaulting a police officer. Didulo later attempted to distance herself from the event by announcing that she had been merely an observer and not a participant.

=== Walled Lake family shooting ===
On September 11 in Walled Lake, Michigan, a QAnon adherent named Igor Lanis shot his wife, one of his two daughters and the family dog following a heated argument. The wife and dog were killed and the daughter was hospitalized. Officers from the Oakland County Sheriff's Office and Walled Lake Police Department shot and killed Lanis after he opened fire on them.

The other daughter, Rebecca Lanis, was out of the house at the time and was not harmed. She told reporters that her father had once been kind but had become rude and unsociable after becoming obsessed with several QAnon-related conspiracy theories following the 2020 presidential election. Lanis posted about her experience to r/QAnonCasualties shortly after the shooting.

=== Attack on Paul Pelosi ===
On October 28, Paul Pelosi, husband of Democratic Speaker of the House Nancy Pelosi, was assaulted at his home and beaten with a hammer by a man. The suspect, David DePape, operated a blog that featured QAnon content among other conspiracy theories.

=== German coup d'état plot ===
On December 7, police in Germany arrested 25 people for allegedly plotting an overthrow of the German government. Part of the alleged plot included planning to storm the Reichstag building. At least 50 people are alleged to be a part of the group, which included QAnon adherents as well as people involved with the Reichsbürger movement.

== 2023 ==
=== Expulsion of Liz Harris ===
In February 2023, QAnon supporter and Arizona State Representative Liz Harris, who had been elected to her position the previous November, invited local insurance agent Jacqueline Berger to testify before a joint meeting of representatives and senators. During the testimony, Berger accused several officials of taking bribes from Mexican cartels and accused the Church of Jesus Christ of Latter-day Saints of money laundering and controlling government agencies. Following this, Representative Ben Toma, who was one of the people Berger accused of bribery, introduced legislation to expel Harris. A House ethics probe found Harris knew that Berger would make false allegations during her testimony but lied about not knowing what she would say.

=== Highlands Ranch booby trap ===
On March 10, a door-to-door salesman in Highlands Ranch, Colorado was approaching a home when he set off a tripwire, setting off a device that created a loud boom noise. Investigators stated the device was a 12-gauge shotgun round without the projectiles. Shortly after a homeowner exited the home and told the salesman and his co-worker "no trespassing". Police arrested the two homeowners, finding a pepper spray trap at the back door. One of the homeowners had around 14,000 followers on a Twitter account where she frequently promoted QAnon.

=== Arrest outside Obama residence ===
On June 28, a 37-year-old QAnon supporter live-streamed himself driving to the National Institute of Standards and Technology offices in Gaithersburg, Maryland, making several statements threatening to blow up the building with a bomb in his van. The next day, the prosecutors issued a warrant for his arrest in connection with actions at the January 6 riot. That same day, the man live-streamed himself outside former President Barack Obama's home, saying he was looking for "entrance points" and "tunnels underneath their homes". He was arrested by Secret Service agents at the scene. Police found a machete, 400 rounds of ammunition, and two handguns in his van.

=== Death of Michael Protzman ===
Michael Protzman, also known as "Negative48", leader of a QAnon faction known for its claims regarding the divine lineage of the Kennedys, died on June 30 in Rochester, Minnesota, following a dirt bike accident.

He was reportedly succeeded by a 13-year-old girl known as "Tiny Teflon", who has expressed an interest in recruiting more children into the group by teaching them its idiosyncratic version of gematria.

=== New Mexico statue protest shooting ===
On September 28, 2023, a man was arrested after he allegedly shot a protester during a demonstration against a statue of Spanish conquistador Juan de Oñate in Española, New Mexico. The alleged shooter had repeatedly expressed belief in the QAnon theory and had posted in support of a different man who shot a protester during a 2020 protest in Albuquerque against another Juan de Oñate statue.

== 2024 ==
=== Atlanta FBI office car-ramming ===
On April 1, 2024, a man was arrested for allegedly trying to enter the FBI field office in Atlanta. According to an affidavit, the man attempted to drive through the entrance by tailing an employee, hitting a gate, before getting out and attempting to walk through. An investigation by an open source group found the suspect had online ties to QAnon-related content.

=== Los Angeles eclipse murders ===
On April 8, 2024, 34-year-old Danielle Johnson pushed her two daughters out of a moving vehicle on the Pacific Coast Highway in Los Angeles, killing her 8-month-old daughter and injuring her other daughter, age 9. Johnson then crashed her car near the highway, killing herself. Two hours later, a neighbor who had heard Johnson and her partner Jaylen Chaney arguing the night prior called police after discovering blood in their apartment elevator. Police found Chaney dead in the apartment, having been stabbed to death. Johnson was an astrology influencer under the handles Ayoka and MysticxLipstick who frequently posted about QAnon. In the days prior to the murders, Johnson had posted about the solar eclipse that occurred on April 8, and had reposted a Tweet from a QAnon account warning of the eclipse the day prior.

=== Brasília bombing ===
On November 13, 2024, two bombs were set off outside the Supreme Federal Court and the Brazilian National Congress in Brasília. The perpetrator was Francisco Wanderley Luiz, a former councillor candidate for the right-wing Liberal Party. He was the only fatality. Luiz had posted about QAnon and related conspiracies on his Facebook account.
