= Bodyguard of Lies =

1975 nonfiction book by Anthony Cave Brown

- Cover for the First Edition
- Author: Anthony Cave Brown
- Language: English
- Subject: D-Day
- Publisher: Harper and Row
- Publication date: 1975
- Publication place: United States
- Media type: Hardcover (2 volumes)
- Pages: 947
- ISBN: 978-1-59921-383-5
- OCLC: 1340409

Bodyguard of Lies is a 1975 non-fiction book on Allied military deception operations during World War II written by Anthony Cave Brown. His first major historical work, it derives its name from a wartime quote of Winston Churchill, and offers a narrative account of aspects of both the Allied and German intelligence operations during the war. The British and American governments resisted Brown's attempts to research the book. Many of the topics were still classified and he was denied access to British war records. The material in the book is predominantly based on oral testimony as well as some American records, declassified toward the end of Brown's research.

Critical reception has been mixed, initially more balanced, generally more negative with time. Contemporary historians, such as Charles B. MacDonald, praised the work – although some did comment on its length. Modern reviewers have identified inconsistencies or errors in the material, based on later declassified records. Also, some of Brown's personal conclusions have been questioned.

== Background ==
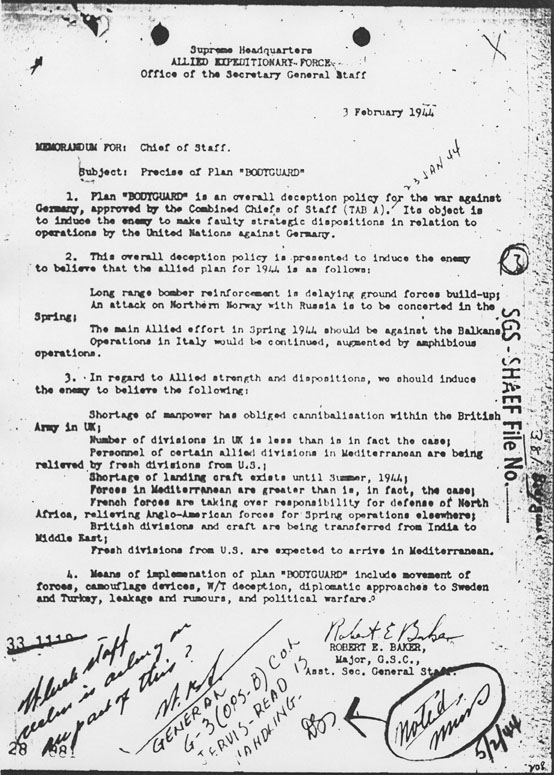
Memorandum on Plan Bodyguard, dated February 1944

Bodyguard of Lies was the British-born Brown's first published book, following his career as a journalist in the United Kingdom and Australia. The work narrates Allied deception strategy on the Western Front for the years of 1943 and 1944. It particularly focuses on Operation Bodyguard, the name of which was inspired by one of Winston Churchill's wartime epigrams; "In war-time, truth is so precious that she should always be attended by a bodyguard of lies."

Brown began researching and writing Bodyguard of Lies in 1961, at a time when details of both cryptography and deception during the war were still classified. His attempts at research was resisted by the British and American governments; he was denied access to British war records and had to undertake considerable work into the 1970s to obtain US records via Freedom of Information requests. Consequently, most of the material is based on oral testimony from Second World War intelligence personnel, as well as records from the National Archives and declassified American records (although Brown says that most of the book was written before he was able to access the latter, in 1974).

== Synopsis ==
Insignia for the fictional FUSAG ("First US Army Group")

Bodyguard of Lies opens with an introduction to Ultra, the codename for decrypted high-level World War II signals intelligence. It goes on to document the origins of the London Controlling Section (LCS) and the work of Dudley Clarke in the Middle East. In late 1942, Allied high command in London became aware of Clarke's successes during the North African campaign. Based on his theories of deception, the LCS was created under Colonel John Bevan and granted broad powers to plan deception strategy. The introduction finishes with a discussion of how the Allies evolved deception strategy prior to 1943, including its Double-Cross System of Allied double agents.

The second section of the book introduces the German intelligence forces, in particular Admiral Canaris and the Abwehr intelligence agency he headed. Brown discusses early deceptions, such as those surrounding Operation Torch, conducted against the Germans, and how the Abwehr struggled to decipher the information it was being fed.

The third section of the book covers Allied deceptions during 1943, in particular Operation Mincemeat. Brown introduces Plan Jael, the early revision of Operation Bodyguard, and follows Bevan's work in creating the deception plan.

The fourth section covers the events of early 1944, leading up to the Normandy landings on 6 June. In particular, Brown discusses Operation Fortitude and the fictional First US Army Group (FUSAG), a key part of Bodyguard, calling it "the greatest charade in history".

The final section of the book covers events on and after D-Day, including physical deceptions carried out on the night of the invasion, and the continued impact of Bodyguard in the months after the landings.

== Critical reception ==
The book received mixed reviews, particularly with regard to Brown's focus on minutiae.

In 1976 New Scientist praised the level of detail, venturing that it "would ensure a large sale". In a letter to the editor in reply, Deputy Chief Historian for the United States Army, Charles B. MacDonald, referred to the book as "the most important work on World War II in a quarter of a century." Writing in Military Review, Alexander Cochran noted that the book was one of the first non-memoir accounts of intelligence operations during the war and was unusual (for its genre) in documenting sources. He went on to call the book "suggestive more than definitive".

Hugh Trevor-Roper, writing for The New York Review of Books, was highly critical of the "encyclopedic" detail in Brown's writing: "He piles on the illustrative (or irrelevant) detail. He cannot leave anything out. Every person mentioned must have a potted biography. Every place must be equipped with atmosphere, furniture, associations." Roper also criticised the material, writing that Brown had inserted "a novel thesis", that Allied deception during the war was controlled by MI6, "which, in my opinion, is quite wrong." Russell J. Bowen concludes that although the writing and coverage were better than similar books then available, "Cave Brown's work fails to escape the common stigma of intelligence narratives: considerable inaccuracy as to detail and occasional lack of validity of interpretation."

Some later reviewers opined the book contained "a multitude of errors of detail". One such accusation was that Brown's suggestion in the book that Churchill had known of German intentions to bomb Coventry in November 1940, but that the British leader had hidden the information to avoid giving up the secrets of Ultra (intercepted German communications). Declassified records in 1976 opposed this popularly held view and suggested that the intelligence on German intentions was more vague. Writing in 1996, reviewer Russell J. Bowen ascribes this discrepancy to Brown's reliance on secondary sourcing and oral interviews (describing the book as an "outstanding example of scholarly investigative journalism applied to the field of oral military history").

In 2015, military historian Max Hastings described the book as "largely a work of fiction".
