= Gian Franco Kasper =

Swiss ski official (1944–2021)

president of the International Ski Federation
- In office 1998–2021

member of the International Olympic Committee
- In office 2000–2018

member of the World Anti-Doping Agency
- In office 2003–2021

Personal details
- Born: 24 January 1944 St. Moritz, Switzerland
- Died: 9 July 2021 (aged 77)
- Education: University of Zurich

Gian Franco Kasper (24 January 1944 – 9 July 2021) was a Swiss ski official who was president of the International Ski Federation (FIS) from 1998 to 2021. He also served as a member of the International Olympic Committee from 2000 to 2018 and member of the World Anti-Doping Agency from 2003 to 2021.

== Early life ==
Kasper was born in St. Moritz on 24 January 1944. He studied at the University of Zurich, obtaining degrees in journalism, philosophy, and psychology. After his university studies, he worked as an editor for the St. Moritz Kurier. He later went into the tourism industry, founding a Swiss tourism office in Montreal in 1974 and serving as its manager.

== Career ==
Kasper was appointed Secretary-General of the International Ski Federation in 1975 by Marc Hodler, its president at the time. He held the post until Hodler's retirement in 1998. Kasper subsequently succeeded Hodler as FIS president, a position he held until one month before his death in 2021. He became a member of the International Olympic Committee in 2000. He served in that capacity until 2018, when he was conferred honorary member status and the Olympic Order. Kasper also sat on the executive committee of the World Anti-Doping Agency starting in 2003. In 2005 he expressed opposition to sanctioning women's ski jumping in the Olympics on medical grounds, saying it "seems not to be appropriate for ladies from a medical point of view".

In February 2019, Kasper stated in an interview that he preferred working with dictatorships over environmentalists. He also questioned climate change and welcomed global warming. A nonprofit organization Protect Our Winters condemned the statement and demanded that Kasper resign from the presidency of FIS. Following the controversy, Kasper apologized for his comments. He retired as president of the FIS in June 2021, a year before the expiry of his term. He was succeeded by Johan Eliasch.

== Personal life and death ==
Kasper was married and had one child. He resided in Thun while also maintaining a house in his hometown. He received an honorary doctorate from the National Sports Academy of Bulgaria in Sofia on 14 December 2007. He was also conferred the 2018 Eagle Award by the United States Sports Academy.

Kasper died on 9 July 2021, at age 77. The cause of death was unknown.
