= Nicky Haslam =

English interior designer and socialite

- Born: Nicholas Ponsonby Haslam; 27 September 1939 (age 86); Great Hundridge Manor, Buckinghamshire, England
- Education: Eton College
- Occupations: Interior designer, author, cabaret singer, book reviewer, art editor, memoirist and literary editor.
- Employer: Nicky Haslam Studio
- Website: www.nickyhaslamstudio.com

Nicholas Ponsonby Haslam (born 27 September 1939) is an English interior designer and socialite, and founder of the London-based interior design firm, Nicky Haslam Studio.

== Early life and education ==
Haslam was born at Great Hundridge Manor, Amersham, Buckinghamshire, the third son of diplomat William Heywood Haslam (1889–1981) and his wife, Diamond Louise Constance née Ponsonby, known as Diana, who was a granddaughter of the 7th Earl of Bessborough, a goddaughter of Queen Victoria, and the former wife of Dr. Henry E. Marks, an American physician. Haslam's brothers are Ralph Michael Haslam (born 1931) and William John Heywood Haslam (born 1933). He also had a half-sister, Diana Marks, known as Anne (1925–1987), who in 1949 married John Hilder Loeb, son of a founding partner of the Brillo Manufacturing Corporation.

Haslam was educated at Eton College, a paid-for public school.

== Career ==
In the early 1960s, Haslman was an editor at Vogue before becoming the art director at Show, the magazine of the arts.

In 1966, Haslam and his lover at the time, American banking heir James Davison, bought Black Canyon Ranch, near Phoenix, Arizona, for breeding and showing Arabian horses. From 1970, he combined breeding show horses, working in Los Angeles as a photographer and designing rooms and parties for clients such as Natalie Wood.

Haslam broke up with Davison, and in 1972 returned to London, where he was soon asked to design and decorate a townhouse for Alexander Hesketh. In the early 1980s, Haslam owned and operated the Nicholas Haslam Showroom on Holbein Place, London, together with his then-partner, Paolo Moschino. When the pair split in 1995, Haslam took control of NH Design as the interior design side of the business, with Moschino taking ownership of the Nicholas Haslam shop. The two businesses today operate separately.

In 2002, Haslam published a book of his work, Sheer Opulence. His autobiography, Redeeming Features, was published in 2009; in it, he mentions his affairs with numerous individuals, including architect Philip Johnson and photographer Antony Armstrong-Jones (who later married Princess Margaret). He is a frequent columnist for The London Evening Standard and The Sunday Telegraph magazines.

Besides frequently writing reviews for The World of Interiors and The Spectator, Haslam wrote a gossip column for Ritz Newspaper under the pseudonym Paul Parsons, and has been a contributing editor of British Vogue and Tatler for many years. In December 2010, Haslam started blogging for The Daily Telegraph.

Before launching her own retail chain, the designer Cath Kidston worked for Haslam.

In 2005, he was reported to be a supporter of the Conservative Party.

In 2011, Haslam designed a set for the play As I Like It by Amanda Eliasch, and also worked on her house in Cheyne Walk. In March 2013, Haslam published a book entitled Nicky Haslam's Folly de Grandeur: Romance and revival in an English country house, which reveals the history and design behind his own home.

In September 2013, with Annabel Astor's furniture company OKA, Haslam launched a collection inspired by Gothick-influenced furniture and accessories from his own house.

== Cabaret performances ==
In June 2009, Haslam performed for five nights singing Lorenz Hart and Cole Porter songs at Bellamy's Restaurant in London. To celebrate the launch of the new Beaufort Bar at the Savoy in London in November 2010, Haslam performed two nights of cabaret, singing Cole Porter songs to a private audience that included Kate Moss, Jerry Hall and Sir Andrew Lloyd Webber.

In March 2014, Haslam performed cabaret at the Spectrum Ball at the Globe Theatre, hosted by Francis Boulle, to benefit the National Autistic Society.

In 2013, Haslam released an album celebrating his singing and memories with his friends Helena Bonham Carter, Tracey Emin, Amanda Eliasch, Bob Geldof, Bryan Ferry and Mick Jagger; called Midnight Matinee, it was produced by his friend David Ogilvy. The album also featured a duet with Cilla Black, in what would turn out to be her final recording prior to her death in 2015.

== Bibliography ==
=== Books ===
- Haslam, Nicholas (2002). Sheer Opulence: Modern Glamour for Today's Interiors. Watson-Guptill. p. 176. ISBN 978-0-8230-4797-0.
- Redeeming Features, published in November 2009 by Knopf (US) and Jonathan Cape (UK).
- Nicky Haslam's Folly de Grandeur: Romance and revival in an English country house. Published in 2013 by Jacqui Small LLP (UK) ISBN 978-1906417857

=== Articles ===
- People. Liz Elliot meets Nicholas Haslam in London and at home in Hampshire, and understands why he has become one of the most important figures – and characters – in British Interior Design. House and Garden. Feb. 2008.
- Dreaming of the Côte d'Azur. An NH Design decorated villa and garden in Saint-Jean-Cap-Ferrat, France. Architectural Digest. March 2008.
- Picture Perfect, Stanley House. Feature on interior in London for a Russian client, designed by Nicky Haslam of NH Design. The World of Interiors. March 2007.
- Stanley House, Russian Architectural Digest. May 2007.
- House of Tricks. Dublin Townhouse decorated by Nicky Haslam of NH Design. House and Garden. Nov. 2006.
- Jungle Diva. By Nicholas Haslam, Article on Dorothy Draper. The World of Interiors. Oct. 2006.
- Pradelles, Janet de Botton's house in Provence, Vogue Living. Oct. 2006.
- The House and Garden Directory of the 100 Leading Interior Designers. House and Garden, 2006
- Modern English. To redo his Manhattan apartment, writer Hugh Bush calls on British design guru Nicholas Haslam to redecorate. Elle Decor, Nov. 2004.
- New Quarters, Nicky Haslam of NH Design re-decorating a New Orleans House. House and Garden, Oct. 2000.
- Fresh Eyre. Peter Eyre's apartment decorated by Nicky Haslam of NH Design, The World of Interiors. Dec. 1997.
- "Pavilioned Splendour. Leamington Pavilion, Barbados." House and Garden. June 1993.
- Haslam's Folly. The Hunting Lodge. House and Garden. Oct. 1993.
- In the image of Beaton. Cecil Beaton's one-time house is now home to interior designer Nicholas Haslam. House and Garden. Oct. 1991.
- Nicky Haslam: Party Monster. The Independent, 21 March 2004.
