= Global Strategy Forum =

Global Strategy Forum was founded by Michael Ancram MP (now Lord Lothian) and Johan Eliasch in 2006 to generate open debate and discussion on key foreign affairs, defence and international security issues. GSF is an independent, non-party political, non-ideological organisation, which aims to provide a platform to explore some of the more challenging and contentious aspects of UK foreign policy and to stimulate imaginative ideas and innovative thinking in a rapidly changing global landscape.

Michael Ancram delivered the Forum's inaugural lecture in May 2006, entitled ‘A Fork In The Road – Sorting Out The UK’s Defence Policy Debacle’. Since then, GSF has continued to hold a regular events programme.

GSF publishes an annual compendium of lectures and an occasional series of monographs, as well as collections of essays and articles by foreign affairs experts.
