= Anthony Cave Brown =

British journalist, writer and historian (1929–2006)

- Born: 21 March 1929; Bath, Somerset, England
- Died: 14 July 2006 (aged 77)
- Education: Luton Grammar School
- Occupations: Journalist; author; historian
- Spouse: Caroline Gilliat (sep. 1962)
- Partner: Joan Simpson Halphen
- Children: 2, including Amanda Eliasch

Anthony Cave Brown (21 March 1929 – 14 July 2006) was a British journalist, espionage non-fiction writer, and historian.

== Early life ==
Brown was born in Bath, and moved to London as a boy, stuffing propaganda leaflets into bombs meant for Nazi Germany towards the end of World War II. He was educated at Luton Grammar School, and joined the Royal Air Force for his national service, working as a photographer.

== Career ==
=== Journalist ===
Brown began his reporting career in Luton and Bristol before moving to Fleet Street in the mid-1950s where he joined the Daily Mail. During the late 1950s he covered the Hungarian uprising (in 1956) and the Algerian War of Independence. In 1958 he was awarded Reporter of the Year. Brown secured the first Western interview with Egyptian president, Gamel Abdel Nasser, and was a frequent drinking companion of Kim Philby in the Middle East prior to the latter's 1963 defection to the Soviet Union. He also interviewed the dissident Soviet writer Boris Pasternak, who at the time was under surveillance, in 1959. He subsequently smuggled two of Pasternak's poems back to the UK, one of which was immediately published in the Daily Mail.

Brown earned a reputation as an adventurous cutting-edge reporter, but developed something of an extravagant lifestyle, and often left behind large unpaid bills on his foreign trips, according to colleagues. He rode on the first nuclear-powered submarine, and travelled to the South Pole with Sir Vivian Fuchs.

In 1960 Brown returned to Britain as chief reporter for the Daily Mail, working to uncover corruption in Scotland Yard, and a major espionage case at the Portland naval base.

In 1962 Brown moved to the United States, spending a year at Stanford University's Hoover Institution as a visiting fellow. He covered the Vietnam War in the 1960s, and worked in Australia for a television station belonging to Rupert Murdoch. He also worked in Singapore and Malaysia.

=== Author and historian ===
Brown's first major work to attract widespread attention was Bodyguard of Lies (1975), which examined the strategical elements of World War II, including codebreaking and its effect on the war's outcome. He followed up on this theme with a book, The Last Hero: Wild Bill Donovan, about William J. Donovan, the director of the American Office of Strategic Services during World War II; the Office of Strategic Services later evolved into the Central Intelligence Agency. Another espionage-related effort was a 1987 biography of Sir Stewart Menzies, who served as head of British MI6 (Secret Intelligence Service) during World War II. The book was titled C: The Life of Sir Stewart Graham Menzies, Churchill's Spymaster. His book Treason in the Blood: H. St. John Philby, Kim Philby, and the Spy Case of the Century, published in 1994, examined the interconnected lives of the famous British spies Kim Philby and Harry St. John Philby, son and father. His final 1999 book Oil, God and Gold: The Story of Aramco and the Saudi Kings, examined the Aramco company in Saudi Arabia.

== Personal life ==
In 1962 Brown separated from his wife Caroline Gilliat (daughter of the British filmmaker Sidney Gilliat) and their two small children. The marriage ended in divorce. The daughter, Amanda Eliasch, is a photographer.

Brown settled in Washington, D.C., later moving to northern Virginia. He began a 37-year relationship with Joan Simpson Halphen, a woman whom he had met in Paris, and utilized her considerable wealth to begin a second career as a major book author and historian, specializing in espionage, World War II, and Cold War themes.

He also has an illegitimate child born in 1965, the result of an affair with a young Australian woman, Sandra Janet Tillet. They were to be married but she considered him "unreliable" and returned to Australia.

== Death ==
Brown died of dementia and pneumonia-related causes in Warrenton, Virginia, US on 14 July 2006, at age 77. Joan Simpson Halphen predeceased him by four months.

== Major works ==
- Bodyguard of Lies. New York: Harper & Row (1975). ISBN 1585746924.
- The Secret War Report of the OSS (1976). ISBN 0425032531.
- The Secret History of the Atomic Bomb, with Charles B. MacDonald (1977). ISBN 0440577284.
- Operation World War III: Secret American Plan (Dropshot) for War with the Soviet Union in 1957 (1979). ISBN 0853681236.
- On a Field of Red: the Communist International and the Coming of World War II, with Charles B. MacDonald (1981). ISBN 0399125426.
- The Last Hero: Wild Bill Donovan. New York: Times Books (Dec. 1982). ISBN 0686959752.
- "C": The Life of Sir Stewart Menzies, Churchill's Spymaster. London: Michal Joseph; New York: MacMillan (1987/88). ISBN 0025173901.
- Treason in the Blood: H. St. John Philby, Kim Philby, and the Spy Case of the Century. Boston: Houghton Mifflin (1994). ISBN 039563119X.
- Oil, God and Gold: The Story of Aramco and the Saudi Kings (26 Feb. 1999). ISBN 0395592208.
