= Cool Earth =

NGO that protects endangered rainforest

- Founded: 2007
- Founders: Johan Eliasch and Frank Field
- Type: NGO
- Purpose: Environmentalism, Conservation, Ecology
- Location: United Kingdom
- Region served: Brazil (project completed); Cambodia; Cameroon; Democratic Republic of Congo; Ecuador (project completed); Mozambique; Papua New Guinea; Peru
- Method: Collaboration
- Key people: Johan Eliasch, Frank Field, Mark Ellingham, Lord Deben, Baroness Jenkin
- Website: CoolEarth.org

Cool Earth is an international NGO that funds Indigenous communities to protect endangered rainforests in order to combat the climate crisis and protect ecosystems.

The charity is associated with long-term partnerships with Indigenous villages, unconditional cash transfers and advocating for basic income as an effective conservation strategy. It shares many of its methods and values with organisations and networks, like Give Directly and the Basic Income Earth Network.

It is supported by Professor Johan Rockstrom and a number of celebrities including the late Dame Vivienne Westwood, Pamela Anderson and Ricky Gervais. Professor James Lovelock, was quoted in the Guardian saying, “You're far better off giving to the charity Cool Earth, which gives the money to the Indigenous peoples to not take down their forests.” Professor Johan Rockström, a world leading climate scientist, and Cool Earth Trustee has also shared his opinions on the charity, “Cool Earth has one of the most effective means of showing that conservation of rainforests can go hand in hand with community development."

In 2016, a detailed external evaluation of Cool Earth was undertaken, showing that Cool Earth was the most cost-effective charity working on mitigating climate change through direct action. The report concluded: "Cool Earth is overall the most cost-effective climate change charity which can reliably reduce emissions without risk". Awards made to the charity include Charity of the Year Civil Society Media Charity Awards and best International NGO at the PEA Awards.

The organisation is funded by over 70,000 individuals as well as foundations and businesses in the US, UK and Europe. Moreover, Cool Earth is ranked “highly effective” by multiple charity evaluators. For example, it has received a top rating from GiveWell.

== History ==
Cool Earth was founded in 2007 by Johan Eliasch and Frank Field out of their common interest in protecting the rainforest. They argued that it was unacceptable that the 20% of carbon emissions created by tropical deforestation were ignored by the Kyoto Protocol and that urgent, direct action was needed to put a stop to deforestation, lest it take up to twenty years to get an idea adopted by the political bureaucracy.

Cool Earth was launched in The Sun Newspaper on June 5, 2007 by Sir David Attenborough as part of The Sun's campaign to save the Amazon Rainforest. As part of the launch, Sir David Attenborough stated, "The idea behind Cool Earth is that we can all make a difference to protect the rainforest, and that might perhaps be the biggest difference we will ever make."

== Activities ==
Cool Earth's ethos is that the most effective custodians of rainforests are the people who have lived there for generations as they have the most to lose from its destruction. Their approach is to work with Indigenous and rainforest-based communities to secure threatened rainforest. The charity provides local people with the support they need to keep their rainforests standing. This is done by concentrating on three key areas, these are:

- Cash Transfers
- Local Economies
- Forest Data

The provision of resources for these areas enables the building of sustainable livelihoods, better schools, better clinics and the empowerment of partner villages to monitor their forest and secure it from illegal logging. This basic model used by Cool Earth has been described as "simple but so intelligent" by the Times journalist Deborah Ross. Cool Earth is currently working alongside 13 partners to protect nearly 100,000 hectares of rainforest across 3 continents. The organisation is currently active in Papua New Guinea, Peru, Cameroon, the Democratic Republic of Congo and Gabon; and has previously finished work in Brazil and Ecuador.

In Peru the charity is working with two Indigenous communities at the frontline of deforestation, the Ashaninka and the Awajún.

One of Cool Earth's most recent campaign was supporting The Queen's Commonwealth Canopy, a project launched in 2015 to preserve and promote forested areas throughout the Commonwealth.

== Recognition ==
Cool Earth has been supported by notable people and ambassadors including Sir David Attenborough, Professor James Lovelock, Dame Vivienne Westwood, Pamela Anderson, Kate Moss, Professor Lord Stern, Dr Tony Juniper, Kelly Hoppen, Leah Wood, Nick Baker, Gillian Burke and Dr John Hemming. In 2019, Cool Earth appeared in the Long Way Up from Apple TV+, where Charley Boorman and Ewan McGregor paused their journey to spend time in the Peruvian Amazon visiting the Asháninka communities that Cool Earth works with.

In 2015, it was named Charity of the Year in its category at the Civil Society Media Charity Awards and best International NGO at the PEA Awards.

In 2016, a detailed external evaluation of Cool Earth undertaken by Giving What We Can found Cool Earth to be the most cost-effective charity working on mitigating climate change through direct action. The report concluded: "Cool Earth is overall the most cost-effective climate change charity which can reliably reduce emissions without risk."

== See also ==
- Eden Reforestation Projects
