= Johan Eliasch =

Swedish-British businessman and environmentalist

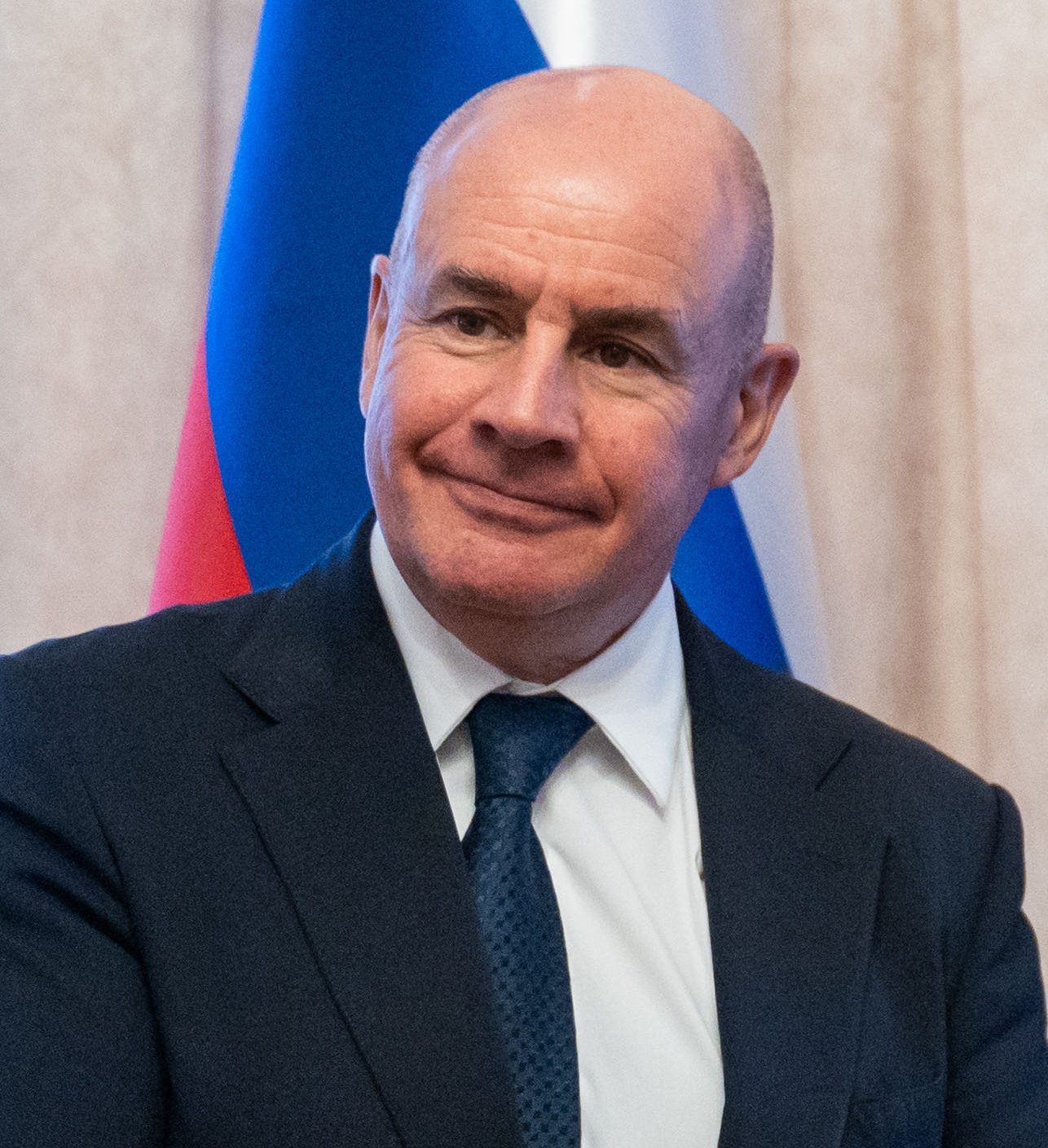
- Eliasch in 2023
- Born: February 1962 (age 64) (Note: His exact day of birth is unknown.); Djursholm, Sweden
- Citizenship: Sweden; United Kingdom
- Education: Stockholm University; Royal Institute of Technology
- Occupations: Industrialist, Financier and Environmentalist
- Title: President, International Ski Federation (FIS)
- Predecessor: Gian Franco Kasper
- Board member of: Equity Partners (Chairman); London Films (Chairman); Saatchi Gallery (Chairman); Cool Earth (Chairman); Global Strategy Forum (President); Member of the IOC
- Spouse: Amanda Eliasch (m. 1988; div. 2006)
- Children: 2
- Website: official website

Johan Eliasch (born February 1962) is a Swedish-British businessman, investor, sports administrator and environmentalist. He was the chief executive of Head, a sporting goods company, from 1995 to 2021, and is now its chairman. The Sunday Times Rich List puts him in number 42 of UK's richest in May 2025 with a net worth estimated at £4 billion.

In 2006, he co-founded Cool Earth, a charity dedicated to rainforest conservation. Under Prime Minister Gordon Brown, Eliasch was the Prime Minister's special representative for deforestation and clean energy. Since June 2021, he has been the president of the International Ski and Snowboard Federation (FIS), the largest international federation within the Olympic movement representing over 53% of Olympic Winter Games medal events. He is a member of the International Olympic Committee, a council member of the Association of International Winter Olympic Federations, and board member of the British Olympic Association.

== Early life ==
Johan Eliasch was born in February 1962, in Djursholm, Sweden. His grandfather, G. A. Svensson, was a leading Swedish industrialist. He graduated in Stockholm with a Master of Science from the Royal Institute of Technology, and a Bachelor of Business Administration from Stockholm University. Eliasch served in a specialist unit at the Life-Guard Dragoons, Military Police, K1, Stockholm, Sweden (1980–81). Eliasch was an active athlete, competing in skiing, golf, tennis, curling, sailing, football, ice hockey and motor racing.

== Career ==
Eliasch began his career in company turnarounds in 1985, when he joined Tufton Group, the London-based investment firm. In 1991, he established his own private investment group, Equity Partners.

When Head Tyrolia Mares was up for auction in 1995, Eliasch spotted an opportunity. The beleaguered sporting goods company was $370million in debt, but through financial restructuring, acquisitions and investment in new technology, Eliasch turned the company, renamed Head, into a global success as CEO from 1995 to 2021.

Eliasch has also been non-executive chairman of Investcorp Europe (2010–2014), a non-executive director of IMG (2006–13), non-executive chairman and director of Starr Managing Agents (2008–2015), and chairman of Aman Resorts (2014–18). He is chairman of Equity Partners and London Films, as well as an advisory board member of Brasilinvest.

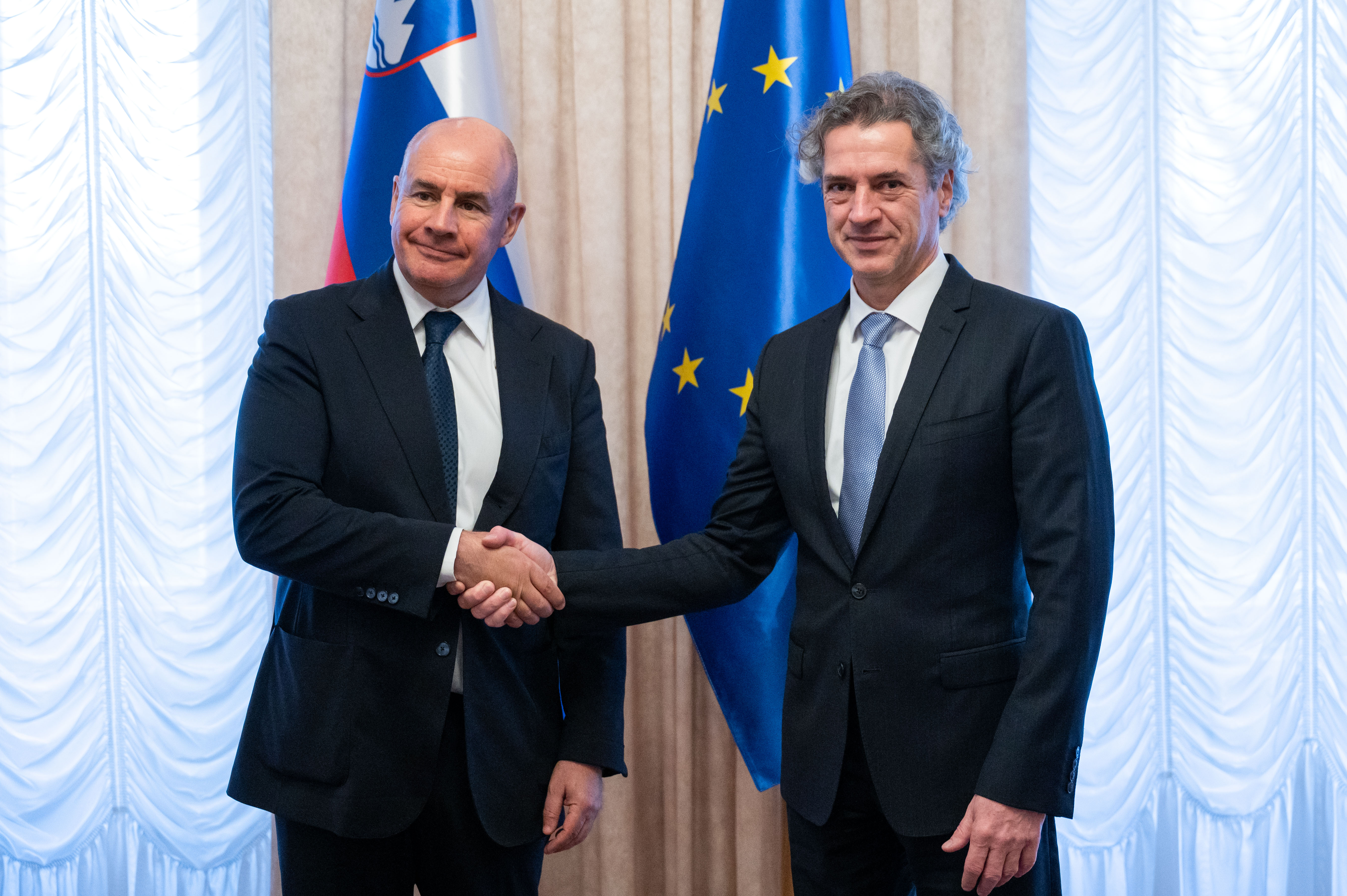
Eliasch with Slovenian prime minister Robert Golob in 2023.

Eliasch has used his business experience to advise politicians and policymakers, including as a member of the International Business Advisory Councils for the Mayors of London, Jerusalem, and Rome.

== Sports administration ==
In June 2021, Eliasch was elected as president of the International Ski and Snowboard Federation (FIS) at the 52nd International Ski Congress, succeeding Gian-Franco Kasper, who had run the organisation for 23 years. Eliasch stepped down as CEO of Head after his election to avoid any conflict of interest. At the 53rd International Ski Congress in May 2022, Eliasch ran unopposed and was re-elected as FIS president through 2026 winning 70 out of 100 votes. Eliasch is a member of the International Olympic Committee's Sustainability and Legacy Commission and President of the Marc Hodler Foundation.

== Philanthropy ==
Eliasch has a longstanding interest in arts and culture, and is chairman of the Saatchi Gallery in London, which since 1985 has presented contemporary art exhibitions showcasing the work of emerging artists. He is also a patron of his alma mater, Stockholm University.

Eliasch has been an advisory board member of the Shimon Peres Peace Centre, World Peace Foundation, the Centre for Social Justice, and the Kew Foundation, Royal Botanical Society.

He has credits in film production including Scarlet Pimpernel, Lady Chatterley, Best of Friends and Resort to Murder.

== Environmental causes ==
In 2005, Eliasch created the Rainforest Trust , purchasing for preservation purposes a 400,000-acre (1,600 km^{2}) rainforest area in the heart of the Amazon rainforest near the Madeira River. He then reportedly closed down the rainforest logging operations in that area in order to cut carbon emissions.

In 2006, he co-founded Cool Earth, a charity he co-chairs, which invests in indigenous communities, sponsoring local NGOs to help improve skills and education, with the ultimate goal of protecting rainforest and reducing global emissions.

Under Prime Minister Gordon Brown, Eliasch was the Prime Minister's special representative for deforestation and clean energy. In 2007 he was commissioned by HM Government to undertake an independent review on the role of international finance mechanisms to preserve the global forests in tackling climate change, The Eliasch Review, which was launched in October 2008, has served as a guideline for REDD (Reduced Emissions from Deforestation and Degradation) as part of the international climate change convention.

In June 2008, the Brazilian Institute of Environment and Renewable Natural Resources began an investigation into a company acquired by Eliasch for alleged illegal deforestation prior to his ownership. The company responded that its logging "had been certified to have been done under the Forest Stewardship Council (FSC) guidelines since 2000." The investigation ended in 2013 with the conclusion that there was no basis for legal or administrative action.

Eliasch is a director of the Foundation for Renewable Energy and Environment, a non-profit, international organisation, an advisory board member for the All-Party Parliamentary Group for the Polar Regions, and Brasilinvest. He is an advisory board member of the Schwarzenegger Climate Initiative and previously was on the International Advisory Board of the Stockholm Resilience Centre.

He chaired the 2021–22 HM Treasury net zero review technology and innovation advisory group, RUSI's Food, Energy and Water security program, and was a member of the DEFRA Council for Sustainable Business.

== Political activity ==
Starting in 1997, Eliasch served the Conservative Party in different roles, including as Deputy Treasurer and Advisor to the Leader, Shadow Foreign Secretary, and European Affairs. He was appointed as a non-political special representative of Labour Prime Minister Gordon Brown on deforestation and clean energy.

Eliasch was a member of the Austrian president's delegation of State for Trade and Industry (1996–2006). He was chairman of the Young Conservatives Party in Djursholm, Sweden, from 1979 to 1982.

Eliasch met Andrew Mountbatten-Windsor in the 1990s and organised a charity tennis match between John McEnroe and Björn Borg in aid of the NSPCC at Buckingham Palace. He was a director along with the Duke of a company called Naples Gold.

In 2006, Eliasch co-founded the Global Strategy Forum with the late Rt Hon Michael Ancram, the Marquess of Lothian, and became the foundation's first president.

== Personal life ==
He was married to Amanda Eliasch, a photographer and filmmaker, from 1988 to 2006; they have two sons. Their son Charles Eliasch is an opera singer.
