= Charles B. MacDonald =

American historian

- Born: November 23, 1922; Little Rock, South Carolina
- Died: December 4, 1990 (aged 68); Arlington, Virginia
- Military career
- Allegiance: United States
- Branch: United States Army
- Rank: Captain
- Unit: 23rd Infantry Regiment
- Conflicts: World War II; Battle of Hurtgen Forest; Battle of the Bulge
- Awards: Silver Star; Purple Heart
- Other work: Historian, writer

Charles B. MacDonald (November 23, 1922 – December 4, 1990) was a former Deputy Chief Historian for the United States Army. He wrote several of the Army's official histories of World War II.

== War service ==
After graduating from Presbyterian College, MacDonald was commissioned as a US Army officer through ROTC and deployed to Europe. By September 1944, as a 21-year-old captain, he commanded a rifle company in the 23rd Infantry Regiment. His company was intended to be part of the effort to capture the Huertgen Forest. They had been transferred north from the area which was, soon after, overrun by the Germans in the first moves of the Battle of the Bulge. They were redeployed to defend a crossroads against the German advance. After delaying the Germans long enough to allow the rest of MacDonald's division to deploy, they withdrew. He received the Silver Star for the action.

While leading his company in a counterattack, MacDonald was wounded on January 17, 1945. After two months convalescence, he was given command of another company in his old regiment, which he led until the end of the war. He also received the Purple Heart.

== Historian ==
His first book, Company Commander, was published in 1947, while his wartime experiences were fresh in his mind. Charles B. MacDonald was the author of The Siegfried Line Campaign and co-author of Three Battles: Arnaville, Altuzzo, and Schmidt, both in the official series United States Army in World War II. He supervised the preparation of other volumes in the European and Mediterranean theater military history subseries and contributed to Command Decisions and American Military History. He authored Company Commander (Washington: 1947), The Battle of the Huertgen Forest (Philadelphia: 1963), The Mighty Endeavor (New York: 1969), and Airborne (New York: 1970).

In 1957 he received a Secretary of the Army Research and Study Fellowship and spent a year studying the interrelationship of terrain, weapons, and tactics on European battlefields. He wrote the final volume of the Green Series on the European Theatre, The Last Offensive. He retired as Deputy Chief Historian, United States Army Center of Military History in 1979.

After his retirement, MacDonald wrote A Time for Trumpets, his last book, a personal history of the Ardennes Offensive which concentrates on the first two weeks of the battle, which he spent five years researching.

MacDonald became ill with cancer and lung disease, and died on December 4, 1990, at his home in Arlington, Virginia, at the age of 68.

== Works ==
- Company Commander
- Airborne
- The Mighty Endeavor: American Armed Forces in the European Theater in World War II
- On a Field of Red: The Communist International and the Coming of World War II (with Anthony Cave Brown)
- The Battle of the Huertgen Forest
- A Time for Trumpets
