= Turning Point UK =

Right-wing political advocacy group

- Abbreviation: TPUK
- Formation: 1 February 2019; 7 years ago
- Type: Nonprofit organisation
- Location: United Kingdom
- President: Marco Longhi
- Affiliations: Turning Point USA; UK Independence Party
- Website: tpointuk.co.uk

Turning Point UK (TPUK) is a British offshoot of the American student pressure group Turning Point USA. The UK group was set up to promote right-wing politics in UK schools, colleges and universities, with the stated aim of countering what Turning Point UK alleges are the left-wing politics of UK educational institutions. The close similarity of Turning Point UK's rhetoric and target demographic to that of Generation Identity, a continental European group with racist and Islamophobic intentions, has been noted by scholars of hate studies and the far-right.

Turning Point UK describes its objectives as promoting "the values of free markets, limited government and personal responsibility". It says it does this to counter what it alleges is "a dogmatic left-wing political climate, education system and radical Labour Party" which, Turning Point UK claims, "sympathises with terrorists [and] wishes to disarm the nation".

The group was launched in December 2018 by Charlie Kirk, founder of Turning Point USA, and Candace Owens. From its inception, the organisation and its leading members were the subject of widespread popular ridicule. It was described by the BBC as "a tsunami of online mockery". In 2021 Nick Tenconi became its Chief Operating Officer and its focus shifted from influencing the conservative movement to street protests.

The group's chief executive, Jack Ross, a Conservative Party member and former election candidate, was filmed in 2026 discussing hiring contract killers. According to Al-Jazeera, Ross introduced an undercover reporter to a violent criminal linked to the paramilitary Ulster Volunteer Force, which is proscribed as a terrorist organisation by the UK government.

== Launch and early years ==
The group was launched in December 2018 by Charlie Kirk, the founder of Turning Point USA, and Candace Owens, then the communications director of the US group, at the Royal Automobile Club in London. Among those attending the event were Andy Wigmore, Paul Joseph Watson, James Delingpole and filmmaker Amanda Eliasch (a follower of David Icke). The event was hosted by John Mappin, a hotel owner and QAnon supporter.

On the day of its social media launch in February 2019, MPs including Jacob Rees-Mogg and Priti Patel tweeted supportive messages for the organisation, as did Nigel Farage, while it was marked for criticism by others. At its inception, the organisation and its leading members were the subject of widespread popular ridicule on the social networking service Twitter. The ridicule continued for at least a week. It was described by the BBC as "a tsunami of online mockery". The launch of its Twitter account was accompanied by multiple parody accounts, along with a parody of the organisation's website created by a 'left-leaning student' calling himself 'Skeptical Seventh'. There was also a protest from the charity Turning Point over potential confusion caused by similarities between the two names.

Turning Point UK's chairman was George Farmer until April 2019. Farmer was Candace Owens' fiancé, a Conservative Party donor, the son of a Conservative peer, and was close to far right activist Paul Joseph Watson of conspiracy theory website Infowars. Until 2021 its CEO was Ollie Anisfeld (the son of Lance Forman, former Brexit Party MEP for London). At its launch in 2019 the group had employed several full-time staff.

In June 2019 it held a £180-a-head fundraising dinner hosted by Ferzana Barclay, wife of Daily Telegraph owner Aidan Barclay. This was attended by Nigel Farage, artist Amanda Eliasch, Brexit Party chair Richard Tice, antisemitic conspiracy theorist John Mappin, Brexit Party candidate Lance Forman, and pundit Toby Young.

According to the Oxford University newspaper Cherwell in early 2019, the group "claims to already have chapters at eight universities". The group's then chairman George Farmer told the paper they had chapters at the universities of Sussex, Oxford, St Andrews, York, Warwick, Nottingham, King's College London, University College London, the London School of Economics and the University of the Arts London. Like Turning Point USA, it does not disclose the identities of its donors.

In 2019 Labour MP David Lammy described Turning Point UK as evidence that "sinister forces are taking hold of our country" and that the Conservative Party "openly promotes hard-right, xenophobic bile". The scholars Chris Allen, of the Centre for Hate Studies at Leicester University, and Ilda Cuko have written that while the group is linked to Turning Point USA, which they note has been linked to the far-right, the UK group does not fit traditional conceptions of the far-right. Allen and Cuko note the group's closely similar rhetoric and demographic to Generation Identity, a continental European group whose intentions are racist and Islamophobic.

Dominique Samuels, then one of the group's "Young Influencers", told the BBC during a radio interview that the UK branch would not set up the same controversial Professor Watchlist for which its US counterpart is known. Samuels later became a GBNews host. The group hosts the TPUK Education Watch website, where students can submit examples of political bias in the education system. The site has been described by the University and College Union as having "the acrid whiff of McCarthyism about it" after it called for videos and photos of lecturers to be sent into it for publication. Turning Point UK rejected the accusation and said that any academic they featured would be given the right to reply and that unlike the US group the default would not be to name people although they reserved the right to do so.

== Involvement with UK political parties ==
In 2022 VICE World News revealed TPUK's deep ties to the Conservative Party via the Orthodox Conservative Group. Operating as SpAds and Parliamentary aides, TPUK ambassadors worked closely with MPs on matters of public policy, while publicly associating with known Alt and Far Right figures.

The Orthodox Conservatives had published a manifesto which laid out their desire to push the Tories further to the Right and (among other things) incorporate anti-LGBT, pro-Christian themes in education.

By 2025, former TPUK ambassador Joseph Robertson had joined Young Reform and former TPUK associate Jess Gill was running the Women's Safety Institute, which promoted Reform's anti-migrant ethos couched in concern for women's safety. The shift from the Conservative party to the Reform party revealed TPUK's commitment to bringing Trumpian politics to the UK.

During the 2026 local elections it was revealed that Reform party candidate Kenneth Morris ran a firm that had been hired by a pro-Putin, Bosnian-Serb leader. TPUK's CEO and COO (Jack Ross and Nick Tenconi) attended the ReArm Europe conference with Williams and all had posed for pictures with the far right Alliance for the Union of Romanians.

== Street protests ==
The Chief Operating Officer until November 2021 was Jack Ross, who then co-directed a group called Reasoned with right wing activist Darren Grimes. In 2021 Reading-based personal trainer Nick Tenconi tweeted that he had taken over as COO. As of 2024, its president is Conservative Party activist Marco Longhi. Tenconi was reported to have attempted to broker a Reform UK candidate to stand aside on Longhi's behalf in the 2024 United Kingdom general election, while also stepping up from deputy leader to interim leader of UKIP.

According to Hope Not Hate, "following the addition of COO Nick Tenconi to the group, it appears to be in the process of reinventing itself as a street-protest organiser, taking a key role in the demonstrations against drag queen storytelling sessions in 2022 and 2023".

=== The Honor Oak pub protests ===
On 25 February 2023 Turning Point UK held a protest in Lewisham, London, against a drag queen event at the "Honor Oak" pub. Journalists from the publication Novara Media reported on the protest, noting that the Turning Point UK activists were greatly outnumbered by counter-protestors who supported the drag queen event, and the Turning Point UK activists' protest was then confined hundreds of metres away from the pub. Both the PinkNews and Southwark News also reported on the number of pro-drag queen counter-protestors vastly outnumbering the Turning Point UK activists.

Turning Point UK held another protest outside the Honor Oak in June, in which three people were arrested, and one trans activist was photographed with blood pouring down their face. Turning Point UK then made posts on Twitter which implied that the activist had faked their injuries.

=== The Great Exhibition pub protest ===
On 10 March 2023 Turning Point UK staged a protest in East Dulwich against an alleged Drag Queen Story Hour outside a pub called "The Great Exhibition." However, the queen event that Turning Point UK was protesting did not exist and the pub was empty during the protest. The protest was based on an outdated advertisement for a drag queen event had already happened the year prior in 2022. Turning Point UK said that there had been a cover-up, and that the pub had deleted one of their drag queen advertisements. The Turning Point UK protest was counter-protested by both LGBT and anti-fascist activists. Turning Point UK's protest against a non-existent drag queen show was mocked by a writer for Novara Media.

=== Anti-Palestinian and anti-migrant protests, far right links ===
During the Gaza war, TPUK co-organised a demonstration on Remembrance Day in November 2023, ostensibly to protect the Cenotaph from potential desecration by pro-Palestine protesters, a demonstration that culminated in protesters fighting police.

Tenconi was involved in the 2024 United Kingdom riots against migrants. On 8 August in Aldershot, he led a small crowd in chanting “invaders out, close off borders, invaders out” outside a hotel housing asylum seekers.

In 2024, according to Hope not Hate, TPUK was reported to have connections with right-wing football hooligan groups including the Pie and Mash Squad and the Democratic Football Lads Alliance.

In 2024 TPUK signed a "patriot declaration" with the anti-migrant group Patriots of Britain, a youth group emerging from the COVID conspiracy theory scene called Students Against Tyranny, and a far-right social media operation called Antifa Public Watch. Tenconi spoke at a conference organised by Tommy Robinson in January 2025, and called for the detention and deportation of “all Islamists” and “all migrants who are here to colonise”.

TPUK participated in the summer 2025 British anti-immigration protests.

== Loyalist paramilitary links ==
In October 2026, Al Jazeera published an investigation revealing links between Turning Point UK and a member of the loyalist paramilitary group the Ulster Volunteer Force (UVF). During the investigation, Turning Point UK chief executive Jack Ross was filmed offering to "broker" the services of UVF member Allan Nesbitt and discussing the price for hiring a contract killer. Ross told an undercover journalist that "They can just kick the fuck out of someone. That's a certain amount. They can start cutting people's faces up, that's another amount. And they can stab someone. They can shoot someone. They can kill someone". Nesbitt, who is from Glasgow, claimed to have killed before and said that any money paid for a contract killing would be used to buy weapons for the UVF in Northern Ireland. According to Al Jazeera, "Ross made clear that he and Nesbitt had a long history together. Ross was filmed by our undercover reporter agreeing to pay Nesbitt thousands of pounds to stage a fake political rally designed to show support for the lifting of UK sanctions against Zimbabwe". Ross's membership of the Conservative Party has been suspended pending an investigation.

== See also ==
- Turning Point Australia
