= Amanda Eliasch =

English photographer, artist, poet and filmmaker (born 1960)

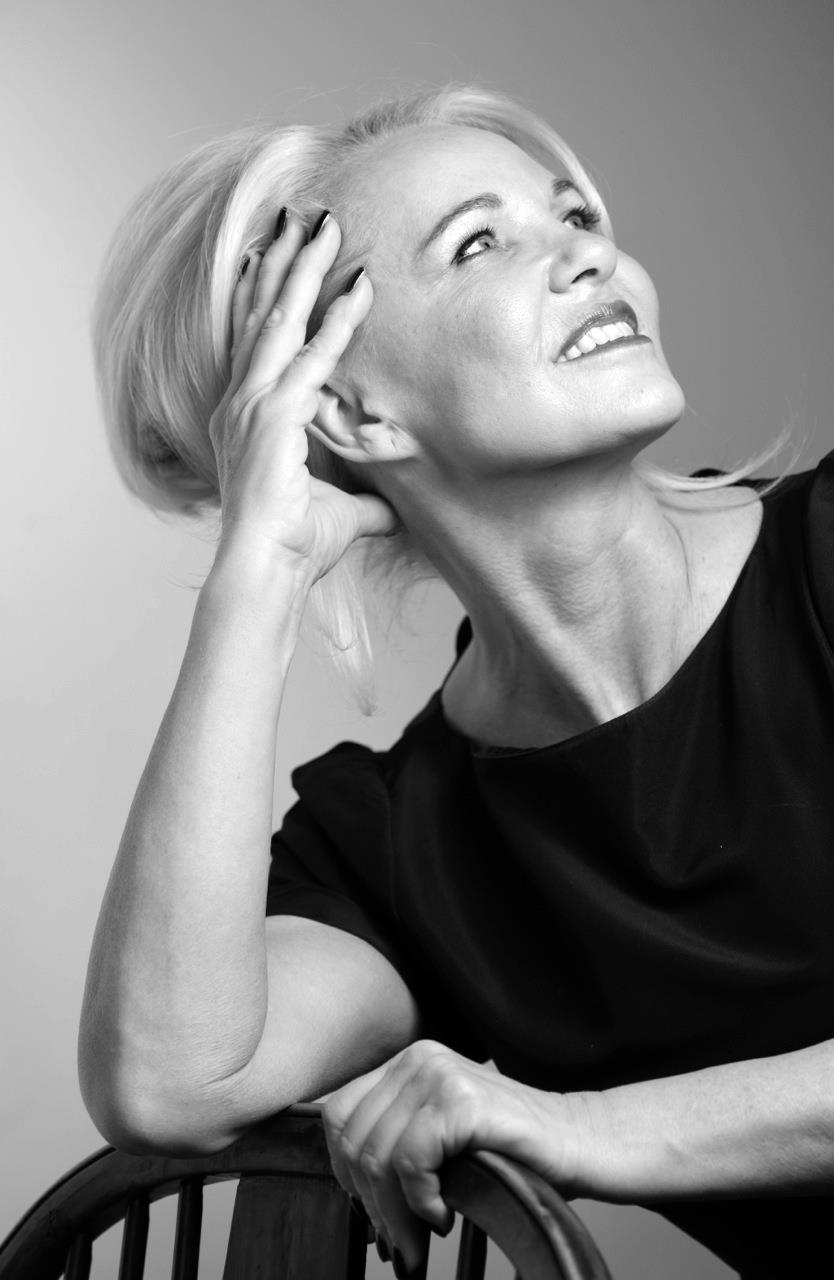
- Eliasch in 2009
- Born: Amanda J. Brown; 1960 (age 65–66); Beirut, Lebanon
- Citizenship: United Kingdom
- Occupations: Photographer; filmmaker
- Spouse: Johan Eliasch (m. 1988; div. 2006)
- Children: 2
- Parents: Anthony Cave Brown; Caroline Gilliat
- Relatives: Sidney Gilliat (grandfather)

Amanda Eliasch (born 1960) is an English photographer, artist, poet, and filmmaker.

== Early life and education ==
Amanda Eliasch was born in 1960 in Beirut, Lebanon, where her father Anthony Cave Brown worked as a foreign correspondent for the Daily Mail, and later wrote several books on espionage and World War II. Her mother, opera singer Caroline Gilliat, left him in 1962. Caroline was the daughter of film director Sidney Gilliat. Amanda returned to England when she was six weeks old, and was brought up by Sidney Gilliat, who encouraged her artistic pursuits.

She is a graduate of the Academy of Live and Recorded Arts.

== Career ==
Eliasch works in art photography.

Her first black and white photographic show was 'Three Way Mirror', held in London in 1999 at the Cork Street Gallery. Her photography work often consists of glossy fashion-shoot images and black and white nudes. In November 2001 she exhibited a series of photographic contact sheets in a London exhibition, at The Proud Gallery, called 'Peep'. Her early work was given a review in British Journal of Photography. Her portraits of 47 British artists were published (with text by Gemma De Cruz) in British artists at work in 2003, and were chosen by both Publishers Weekly and Art Monthly for their lists of seasonal highlights; the collection was also published in French as Artistes contemporains: Londres. From this book Eliasch started her own collection through photographing and entertaining many artists including Tracey Emin and Polly Morgan in her St Tropez home.

Her photographs have appeared in Made by Indians (2007), a book on Indian contemporary art curated by Fabrice Bouret, and Made by Brazilians (2014), a book on Brazilian contemporary art curated by Fabrice Bouret.

She has also published poetry. In 2008, Chipmunka Publishing published her book of poetry, Cloak & Dagger Butterfly. Based on the book and a letter she wrote to her father, a theatrical production was produced by Eliasch As I like it at London's Chelsea Theatre in July 2011; later that year it was transferred to the Macha Theatre in Los Angeles. In 2010 she published Sins of a Butterfly, a poetry collection. During the Summer of 2011 Eliasch produced the Rebel Show of James Franco at the Venice Film Festival with Liberatum.

Eliasch exhibited artworks in July 2011 at the Leadapron Gallery, Los Angeles. Called Peccadillos, the exhibits were neon sculptures inspired by cartoons of her committing the seven deadly sins with neon artist Michael Flechtner in Los Angeles, they were drawn by her friend Kay Saatchi. The exhibition later transferred to the Doyle Devere Gallery in Notting Hill Gate, London.

The same year, Eliasch worked as a film director and writer, making a "jarringly frank" documentary drama The Gun, the Cake and the Butterfly, which contained the line: "When a woman confronts her loneliness she is free." It was based on her book and the theatrical production. In 2013 it won the Lena Wertmuller prize for best Documentary Drama and was screened at the Ischia International Film and Music Festival and the Bel Air Film Festival, Los Angeles, where she won Best Edit and best documentary made by a woman. The film has reportedly been called 'shockingly frank' by critics.

In 2014 she was producer of The Vortex by Noël Coward at the Matrix Theatre in Los Angeles.

She confronted her doppelganger, who was using her name to gatecrash parties. 2016 Her work appeared in Desire Magazine.

Since 2008, Eliasch has also worked as the fashion editor for Genlux Magazine in Los Angeles.

Eliasch subscribes to the Oxfordian theory of Shakespeare authorship, and has made a film about it, the 2025 The Truth Will Out.

== Recognition and awards ==
Eliasch was presented with the "Most Imaginative Documentary Film Award" at the 11th annual Ischia Global Film & Music Festival in June 2013. It also received an honorary award for the Most Imaginative Documentary at the New York City International Film Festival. She was named Best Female Director at the Burbank Film Festival and won the most exceptional documentary award at the La Jolla Indie Fest.

== Political views ==
In 2017, she said that Enoch Powell had been "sadly proven right" in his "Rivers of Blood" speech. She has shared material from conspiracy theory influencer David Icke, including one in which he claimed there is a “political system orchestrated, created and controlled to this day by the Rothschilds called Zionism. It is a tyrannical system which has no mercy on anyone who gets in its way." In 2019, she attended a fundraising dinner for the right-wing group Turning Point UK. In 2017, she blogged in a later deleted entry

The Muslims wear clothes that are not compatible with our way of life in England, Scotland and Wales, and are violent and abusive to women and gay men, our population here, The USA and in Europe are attacked regularly. This week is the final straw. It is enough. We will fight back. We are fed up and those that do not want to integrate, they should leave for countries that suit them and be honest. Certainly not take subsidies and live here for our health service etc. They have encouraged our fear of ‘political correctness’ which is nonsense. Katie Hopkins lost her job but Sadiq Kahn [sic] has not? They have lived off our fear of being accused of racism but enough is enough. A Muslim of this sort cannot be welcome in this country. Take off the burka, take off the Hajib [sic],... show your face and join in or get out... Let's wake up and know that a 'Fox is in the chicken house'.

In 2019, she commented on the blog entry that "I don't feel that way anymore."

== Personal life and other activities ==
Eliasch was married to Johan Eliasch, chairman of Head, from 1988 to 2006; the couple has two sons. Eliasch has publicly defended her friend Charles Saatchi during his divorce proceedings with Nigella Lawson. She has been linked romantically with Sir Tim Rice since 2007 and plastic surgeon Jean-Louis Sebagh which ended in 2007.

In 2013 she contributed to Nicky Haslam's album Midnight Matinee. That year the writer Katie Glass from the Sunday Times said she looked "like Marilyn Monroe dressed as a gothic Japanese schoolgirl".

As of 2013, her London residence and studio is in Cheyne Walk, where her art collection is on display, including pieces by Michael Ayrton and Oriel Harwood, a white elephant by Marc Quinn and Jake and Dinos Chapman. She divides her time between London and Los Angeles, and also has a home in Paris.

Eliasch sponsors the British Film Institute as part of the Directors Cut programme, and The Elephant Family. In 2016 she supported The Evening Standard Film Awards for best screenplay in memory of her great grandfather George Gilliat, editor of the Evening Standard in 1930, and his son the screenwriter Sidney Gilliat.
