= John Mappin =

British businessman and hotelier

John Mappin is a British businessman, hotelier, and political activist. He is the owner of Camelot Castle Hotel in Tintagel, Cornwall, which he purchased in 1999. A descendant of the founding family of the Mappin & Webb jewellery dynasty — though he inherited nothing from it, as the company passed out of family ownership in 1959, decades before his adulthood — he has been involved in far-right politics, serving as an early backer of Turning Point UK, and has been widely identified in the press as one of the UK's most prominent promoters of the QAnon conspiracy theory. In 2002, a High Court judge found him liable for fraudulent misrepresentation in a civil lawsuit brought by Benjamin Pell.

== Early life and background ==
John Mappin was educated at Winchester College from 1979 to 1983. He is a descendant of the family behind Mappin & Webb, the historic British jewellery and silverware firm founded in 1775, which held a Royal Warrant and served the British royal family. The company passed out of family ownership in 1959 when Sears Holdings acquired a controlling stake; it is today owned by the Watches of Switzerland Group.

In his mid-twenties, Mappin moved to Los Angeles, where he worked in the film and entertainment industry, specialising in story rights and distribution. During this period he spent six years studying Scientology.

== Camelot Castle Hotel ==
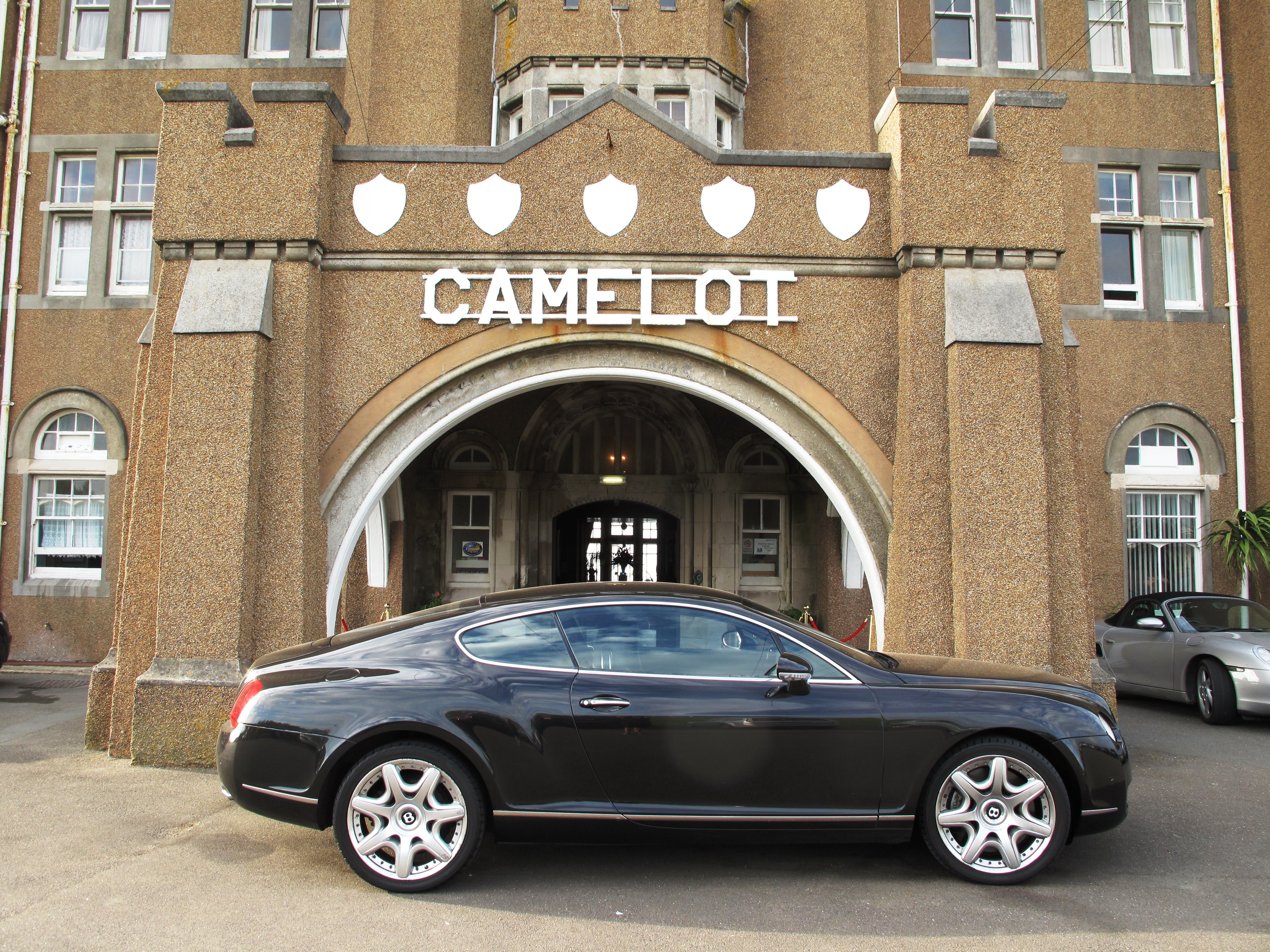
Camelot Castle, Cornwall, UK - entrance - September 2010

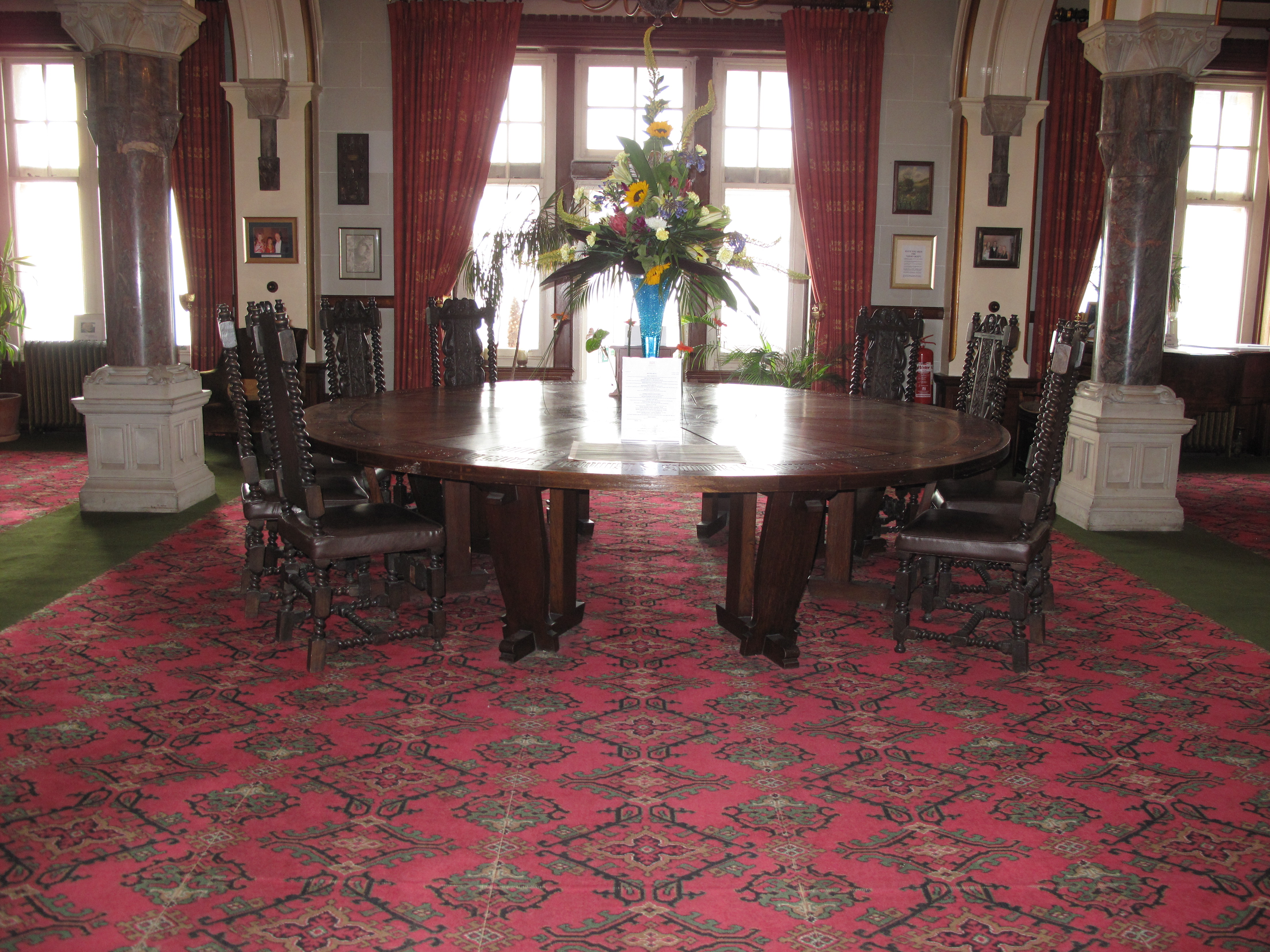
Camelot Castle, Cornwall, UK - Reconstruction of King Arthur's Round Table - September 2010.

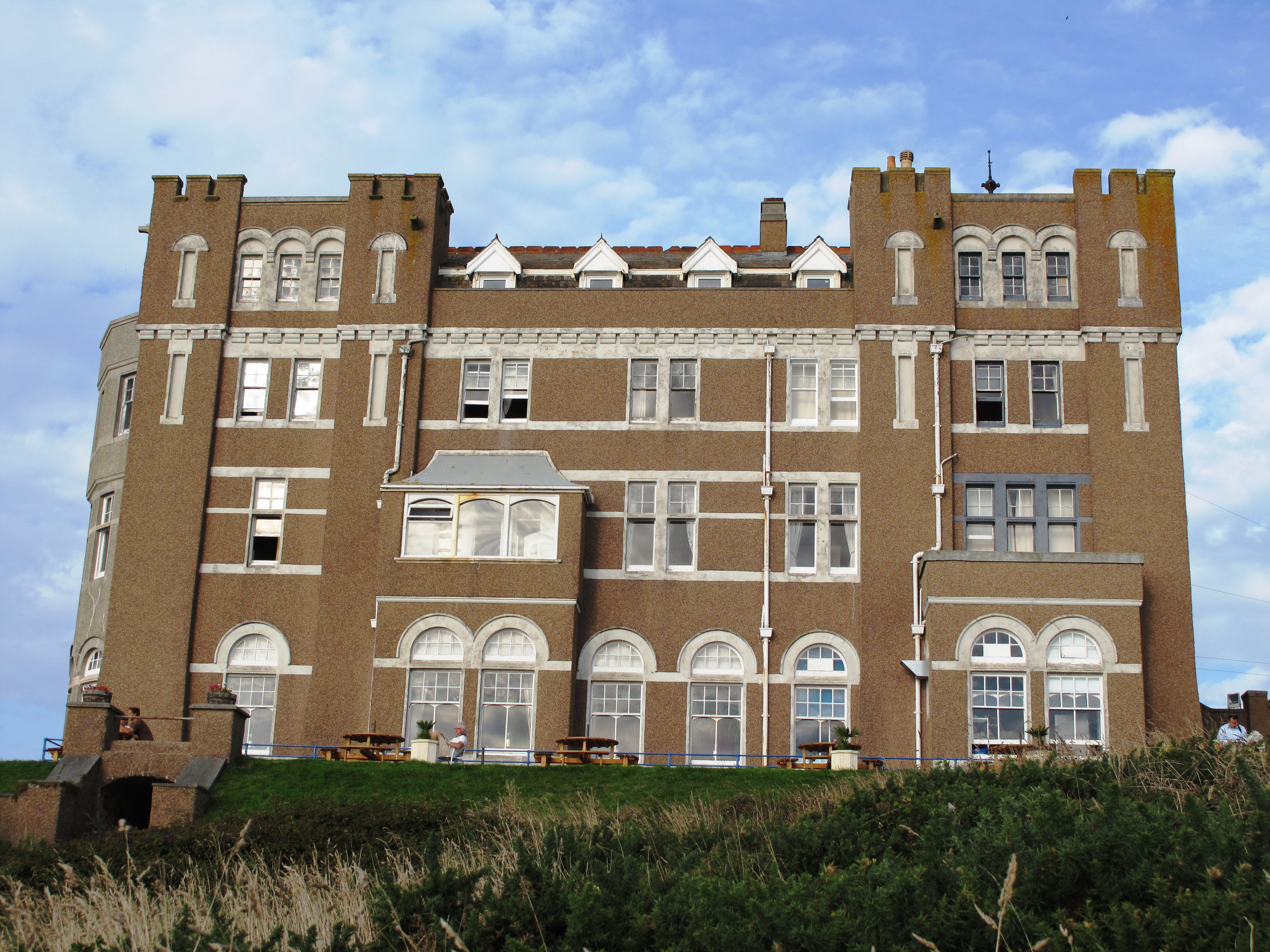
Camelot Castle, Cornwall, UK - Exterior from the rear - September 2010.

In February 1999, Mappin purchased Camelot Castle, a Victorian-era clifftop building in Tintagel, Cornwall, near the legendary site associated with King Arthur. He originally acquired it as a private residence. In 2001, he married Irina Kudrenok, originally from Kazakhstan, whom he had met in London. Together with artist Ted Stourton, the couple subsequently opened the property as a hotel.

The hotel operates an Artists in Residence programme, inviting artists to stay at no charge. Guests have reported receiving unsolicited Scientology literature in the post following their visits, and the hotel has been described in press accounts as a venue for Scientology promotion. One guest reported that two Scientology DVDs were sent to their eight-year-old daughter after a family stay. A "Merlin's Box" at the hotel invited guests to write letters with personal wishes; respondents reportedly received Scientology materials in return.

In 2010, after the hotel had accumulated negative reviews on TripAdvisor, Mappin engaged an online reputation management firm and publicly claimed the critical reviews were part of a smear campaign by opponents of Scientology. TripAdvisor noted that a significant portion of reviews rated the hotel "terrible" and raised concerns about fake positive reviews.

In 2022, Mappin publicly stated he had declined a UK government contract to house asylum seekers at the hotel, which would have used all 65 rooms for approximately one year and was estimated to be worth around £1 million. The story received national media coverage. Mappin was subsequently interviewed by Tucker Carlson on Fox News, bringing the story to an international audience.

== Political activities ==
=== Turning Point UK ===
In December 2018, Mappin and his wife Irina hosted the launch event for Turning Point UK (TPUK) at the Royal Automobile Club in London. Charlie Kirk, the founder of Turning Point USA, directed potential donors to speak with Mappin at the event. Mappin has described himself as a co-founder of Turning Point UK, though the organisation has sought to distance itself from him in subsequent years.

Brexit donor Arron Banks described Mappin in his memoir Bad Boys of Brexit as "a total fruit loop," recounting a pitch in which Mappin claimed to be "launching a super-powered brain-control system that requires delivery in fifty languages in every major city."

=== Connections with Nigel Farage and Donald Trump ===
Mappin's relationship with Nigel Farage spans several years and contexts. In 2019, a Turning Point UK fundraiser dinner at Camelot Castle, priced at £180 per head, included Farage among the guests. Mappin also appeared as a guest on Farage's programme on GB News in connection with his refusal to house asylum seekers at Camelot Castle.

Mappin met Donald Trump at a Washington fundraiser in 2017. In 2016, he hosted a ceremony at Camelot Castle awarding Trump a symbolic "Honorary Camelot Castle Knighthood," presenting him with a replica sword named Excalibur.

== QAnon advocacy ==
On New Year's Eve 2019, Mappin raised a flag bearing the letter "Q" over Camelot Castle. The story attracted national press coverage in January 2020. Hope not Hate described it as "a childish ploy" and "a weak attempt at getting attention." The FBI has identified QAnon as a contributing factor in right-wing violence in the United States.

Mappin and his wife hosted a daily online show, the Camelot TV Network, discussing QAnon-related themes. The hotel was described by Coda Story in 2021 as "the spiritual home of British QAnon."

The Jewish Chronicle reported that Mappin shared social media posts containing false claims about George Soros. During the COVID-19 pandemic, Mappin circulated posts characterising the pandemic as "just a bad flu" and shared material raising alarms about the Pfizer vaccine.

In early 2022, following Russia's invasion of Ukraine, Mappin posted content describing the invasion as "a gift for the freedom of the world" and characterised Ukraine's government as "deep state Nazi collaborators." He subsequently deleted some of these posts.

== Legal issues ==
=== Pell v Mappin (2002) ===
In 2002, the High Court ruled against Mappin in a civil action brought by Benjamin Pell, known in the press as "Benji the Binman." Pell alleged that Mappin had induced him to pay £77,500 by falsely representing that a well-connected Hollywood producer was preparing a film about Pell's life. The supposed producer was in fact a hairdresser, Iain Jones, who had no filmmaking experience.

Mr Justice Gray ruled that Mappin had "practised a deceit on Mr Pell" and was "party to a scam designed to extract money" from Pell, whom he knew to be vulnerable. The judge also found that Mappin had given a "wholly mendacious account" in his witness statement. Mappin was ordered to repay the full £77,500.

== Business interests ==
According to Companies House records, Mappin is listed as a director or secretary of several companies, including Camelot Castle Hotel Ltd, Mythological Hotels Ltd, Camelot Castle Flats Ltd, Metropolis Media Investments Ltd, and Independent Local Newspapers Ltd.

== Personal life ==
Mappin married Irina Kudrenok in Kazakhstan in 2001. She was born in 1979 in what is now Nur-Sultan, Kazakhstan, and studied economics and political science. The couple are co-owners of Camelot Castle Hotel.
