= Marc Hodler =

- Marc Hodler
- Born: 26 October 1918; Bern, Switzerland
- Died: 18 October 2006 (aged 87); Bern, Switzerland
- Resting place: Bern, Switzerland
- Education: University of Bern
- Occupation: Lawyer
- Known for: IOC member
- Children: Two sons

Marc Hodler (26 October 1918 – 18 October 2006) was a Swiss lawyer, President of the International Ski Federation (1951–1998), member of the International Olympic Committee (IOC) from 1963 until his death, and bridge player. Hodler is best known for having exposed the Olympic bid scandal for the 2002 Salt Lake City Winter games in December 1998.

Born in Bern, Hodler was a keen skier and first urban member of his national squad. An injury prevented him from entering any international competitions but he became a coach.

Hodler was the president of the International Ski Federation from 1951 to 1998. He was an IOC vice president from 1993 to 1997 and served four separate terms on the rule-making executive board.

Hodler was an international bridge player, representing Switzerland in the 1957 European Open Teams championship. Domestically he won five Swiss championships. Internationally, he was President of the World Bridge Federation Congress from 2001 to 2006.

Hodler died in Switzerland at the age of 87 after suffering a stroke a week shy of his 88th birthday. His funeral was held on 31 October 2006, at the Cathedral of Bern.
