= Clyde X =

American religious leader associated with the Nation of Islam

- Born: Clyde Jones; 1931; Canton, Mississippi
- Died: February 14, 2009 (aged 79); Cleveland, Ohio
- Occupations: Nation of Islam activist, later an Imam
- Years active: 1958–1970s

Clyde X (1931 – February 14, 2009), also known as Clyde Rahman, was a religious leader associated with the Nation of Islam. Most of his work for the NOI was in St. Louis, Missouri and Cleveland, Ohio. He was wounded when a violent factional dispute arose in St. Louis in the 1960s. In the 1970s he became a follower of W. D. Muhammad's Sunni faction of the NOI and established a mosque in Cleveland.

== Early life ==
He was born Clyde Jones in Canton, Mississippi. He served in the U.S. Army during the Korean War. After his service, he moved to Dayton, Ohio, and then to Detroit where he worked as a machinist.

He served in the army during the Korean War, in which he was badly wounded. He joked that he was cured when a nurse denied him morphine, and he jumped out of bed to chase her. He subsequently joined the police force in Detroit.

== NOI activist ==
While in Detroit, Clyde was first introduced to the Nation of Islam (NOI) through "people talking about it in a poolroom." He became "Clyde X". In 1958 he was sent to St. Louis in the service of the NOI to establish Temple No. 28 at 1434 N. Grand Avenue.

When he arrived in St. Louis, the local media described him as "a glowering moon-faced giant... on the fleshy side of 200 pounds... mild mannered, polite, and diplomatic." They also described him as "too emotional," a "rabble rouser," and "a haranguer."

Clyde X helped to launch many business ventures with Temple No. 28, opening a restaurant called the "Shabbaz"; laundry; record store; dress shop; and a grocery along Grand Avenue, leading some in the community to call the area "Little Egypt."

== Violent splits ==
In 1961, Clyde X's Temple No. 28 saw an internal split, with members leaving to join the offshoot "Islamic Service Church" headquartered at 1902 Union Boulevard. Elijah Muhammad, displeased with the split, sent the Supreme Commander of the Fruit of Islam to try to broker a reconciliation. No such agreement could be reached, and the two temples were officially separated.

The split resulted in sporadic incidents of violence, with Clyde X, Timothy Hoffman, and John Moore being shot outside the Shabazz restaurant in 1966. The principal suspect was Hoffman's brother Andrew, who was subsequently arrested. While Clyde and Hoffman were not seriously hurt, Moore died as a result of his wounds. Nevertheless, Clyde had a bullet lodged in his skull for the rest of his life. One year later, on January 9, 1967, Clyde X's home was bombed, but he was unhurt. Andrew Hoffman was again suspected. Two days after this Andrew Hoffman and his wife were both shot to death outside their home. An associate of his, Roy Tyson, was found beaten to death. No charges were ever brought in the deaths.

== Later career ==
In the mid-1970s, after the death of Elijah Muhammad, Clyde X supported the reforms of Warith Deen Mohammed's faction, which sought to align the NOI with mainstream Sunni Islam. He became a leader in W.D. Mohammed's new organization, the American Society of Muslims. He moved to Cleveland, Ohio, where he worked with Cleveland's Muslim community using the name Imam Clyde Rahman. Rahman became W.D. Muhammad's principal representative in Cleveland, building the Masjid Bilal mosque there in 1983. He adopted an ecumenical approach saying "Our Koran does not even hint that we should take innocent life, and it is a disgrace to Islam for any Muslim to support terrorism."

He served on the board of a number of local civic groups. In his last years he suffered from complications of Alzheimer's disease. He died on February 14, 2009, at age 79, at Park East Care and Rehabilitation Center, Beachwood.

== Family ==
Rahman married twice. His first wife, Beatrice, died young. The couple had no children. Rahman came to believe he may be infertile. However, he remarried in 1990 to Hameeda, with whom he had three daughters, Daa'iyah Rahman, Jameelah Rahman, and step-daughter Siddeeqah Abdullah.
