= Nation of Islam and antisemitism =

Antisemitism in the Nation of Islam

A number of organizations and academics consider the Nation of Islam (NOI) to be antisemitic. Leaders of the Nation of Islam, like Louis Farrakhan, have engaged in Holocaust denial, and exaggerates the role of Jews in the African slave trade; mainstream historians, such as Saul S. Friedman, have said Jews had a negligible role. The NOI has repeatedly rejected charges made against it as false and politically motivated.

== Charges of antisemitism ==
The Anti-Defamation League, the Southern Poverty Law Center, the American Jewish Committee, the American Jewish Congress, and the Stephen Roth Institute for the Study of Contemporary Antisemitism and Racism have condemned the Nation of Islam as antisemitic.

Scholars of comparative religion have argued that the Nation of Islam is antisemitic and advocates Holocaust denial. For instance, in the Global Journal of Classical Theology, Professor Richard V. Pierard writes:

Holocaust denial is a stock in trade of Ku Klux Klan, Neo-Nazi, Skinhead...and one also finds it in Black hate groups like Louis Farrakhan's Nation of Islam, some Afrocentrist writers, and in Arab anti-Israel rhetoric. The common thread running through all these manifestations is anti-Semitism; that is, hatred or dislike of Jews.

A report by the Stephen Roth Institute for studying Anti-Semitism and Racism states the following:

Louis Farrakhan, and the Nation of Islam (NOI), which he heads, have a long, well-documented record of hate-filled and anti-Semitic rhetoric. Over the years, NOI ministers and representatives have regularly expressed anti-Semitic, anti-white, anti-homosexual and anti-Catholic sentiments in their speeches. Furthermore, The Final Call, the NOI's official organ, reflects the anti-Semitism of Farrakhan and his organization.

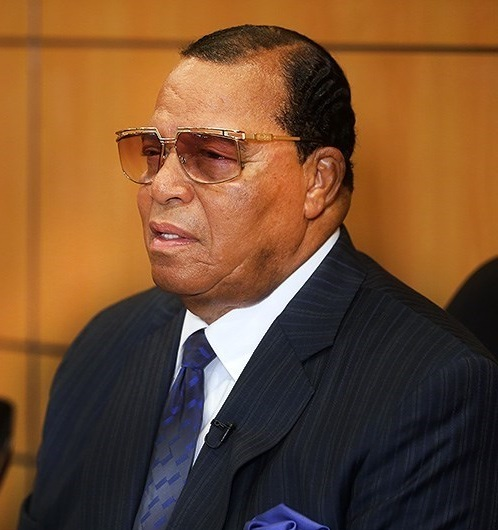
Louis Farrakhan in a press conference at the Spinas Hotel, Tehran, Iran.

British Home Secretary Jack Straw and lawyers for the Home Office have also described Farrakhan's views as "anti-semitic and racially divisive", and as a result he has been banned from the United Kingdom since 1986.

A Catholic magazine, This Rock, has described the Nation of Islam as both antisemitic and anti-Catholic.

A number of prominent secular humanists have written that the NOI is antisemitic. Hating in the Name of God, by Benjamin Radford (Council for Secular Humanism website), and Madeline Weld's address to the 1995 annual meeting of the Humanist Association of Canada are examples of such criticism.

=== Farrakhan calls Jews "Satanic" and compares Jews to termites ===
Louis Farrakhan said in a 2014 speech that "the satanic Jews that control everything, and mostly everybody, if they are your enemy, you must, must be somebody." In an October 2018 speech, Farrakhan referred to Jews as termites: "So when they talk about Farrakhan, call me a hater, you know what they do, call me an anti-Semite. Stop it, I'm anti-Termite."

=== Jews "control the economy" ===
For many years certain Nation of Islam (NOI) ministers have been preaching that "the Jews" control the American economy and the world economy. Statements to this effect can be found in its newspaper The Final Call and in speeches given in their temples and on college campuses.

For example, the Dallas Observer recorded this dialogue between Nation-of-Islam leader Louis Farrakhan and an audience to which he was speaking:

Farrakhan: "Is the Federal Reserve owned by the government?"
Audience: "No."
Farrakhan: "Who owns the federal reserve?"
Audience: "Jews."
Farrakhan: "The same year they set up the IRS, they set up the FBI. And the same year they set up the Anti-Defamation League of B'nai Brith. ... It could be a coincidence. ... [I want] to see Black intellectuals free. ... I want to see them not controlled by members of the Jewish community."

=== Alleged major role of Jews in the slave trade ===
The Secret Relationship Between Blacks and Jews is a book published in 1991 by the Nation of Islam. The book alleges that Jews dominated the Atlantic slave trade. The book has been labeled an antisemitic canard by historians including Saul S. Friedman, who has written that Jews had a minimal role in New World slave trade. Henry Louis Gates, head of the department of Afro-American studies at Harvard University, called the book "the bible of new anti-Semitism" and added, "The book massively misinterprets the historical record, largely through a process of cunningly selective quotations of often reputable sources."

=== Criticisms of perceived Jewish "control" ===
Elijah Muhammad, Louis Farrakhan, Khalid Abdul Muhammad, and other NOI ministers have been frequently critical of what they perceive as the Jewish control over African American society, their beliefs frequently approaching conspiracy theories like the International Jewish conspiracy. For example:

We are not giving them [Jews] power by getting into the debate, they already have power. They control Black intellectuals, they control Black politicians, Black preachers, Black artists—they control Black life. I'm not against Jews, I'm against control by any group, of us ... I don't know how you can talk about Black liberation without confronting that and not talk about those who stifle Black thought, freedom of Black liberation.

Farrakhan gave a speech attacking then National Security Advisor Sandy Berger, Secretary of State Madeleine Albright, Treasury Secretary Robert Rubin, and presidential advisor (later Chicago mayor) Rahm Emanuel. In regards to their names, he stated that "Every Jewish person that is around the president is a dual citizen of Israel and the United States of America ... and sometimes, we have to raise the question, Are you more loyal to the state of Israel than you are to the best interests of the United States of America?"

=== References to Jews as "bloodsuckers" ===
Some NOI ministers have called Jews bloodsuckers. For example, in his Saviours' Day speech in Chicago, Illinois, February 25, 1996, Louis Farrakhan stated:

And you do with me as is written, but remember that I have warned you that Allah will punish you. You are wicked deceivers of the American people. You have sucked their blood. You are not real Jews, those of you that are not real Jews. You are the synagogue of Satan, and you have wrapped your tentacles around the U.S. government, and you are deceiving and sending this nation to hell. But I warn you in the name of Allah, you would be wise to leave me alone. But if you choose to crucify me, know that Allah will crucify you.

One former NOI minister Khalid Abdul Muhammed referred to Jews as bloodsuckers.

I called them Jews bloodsuckers. I'm not going to change that. Our lessons talk about the bloodsuckers of the poor in the Supreme Wisdom of the Nation of Islam. It's that old no-good Jew, that old imposter Jew, that old hooked-nose, bagel-eating, lox-eating, Johnny-come-lately perpetrating a fraud, just crawled out of the caves and hills of Europe, so-called damn Jew ... and I feel everything I'm saying up here is kosher.

— Speech in Baltimore, MD, February 19, 1994

Quotes from Khalid Abdul Muhammad, the spokesperson until 1993:

Who are the slumlords in the Black community? The so-called Jews ... Who is it sucking our blood in the Black community? A white imposter Jew.

=== Malcolm X and antisemitism ===
Malcolm X, a member of the Nation of Islam until he left in 1964, made antisemitic statements and is thought to have held antisemitic beliefs. His autobiography contains several antisemitic charges and caricatures of Jews. Alex Haley, the autobiography's co-author, had to rewrite some of the book in order to eliminate a number of negative statements about Jews in the manuscript. Malcolm X believed that the fabricated antisemitic text Protocols of the Elders of Zion, was authentic and introduced it to NOI members, while blaming Jewish people for "perfecting the modern evil" of neo-colonialism. He was a leading figure in reshaping the black community's perception of The Holocaust, engaging in Holocaust trivialization and claiming that the Jews "brought it on themselves".

In 1961, Malcolm X spoke at a NOI rally alongside George Lincoln Rockwell, the head of the American Nazi Party. Rockwell claimed that there was overlap between Black nationalism and White nationalism. Even after his departure from the NOI and during the last months of his life, Malcolm X's statements about Jews continued to include antisemitic images of Jews as "bloodsucker[s]".

== Response to charges of antisemitism ==
The Nation of Islam has repeatedly denied charges of antisemitism. Louis Farrakhan has stated, "The ADL ... uses the term 'anti-Semitism' to stifle all criticism of Zionism and the Zionist policies of the State of Israel and also to stifle all legitimate criticism of the errant behavior of some Jewish people toward the non-Jewish population."

In a letter responding to Anti-Defamation League (ADL) Director Abraham Foxman's insistence that black leaders distance themselves from the Nation of Islam, hip hop mogul Russell Simmons wrote: "Simply put, you are misguided, arrogant, and very disrespectful of African Americans and most importantly your statements will unintentionally or intentionally lead to a negative impression of Jews in the minds of millions of African Americans," he continued, "For over 50 years, Minister Farrakhan has labored to resurrect the downtrodden masses of African Americans up out of poverty and self-destruction" and indicated that he had personally witnessed Farrakhan affirm, 'A Muslim can not hate a Jew. We are all members of the family of Abraham and all of us should maintain dialogue and mutual respect.'"

== Jews, Nazis, and the Holocaust ==
Farrakhan stated at the Mosque Maryam in Chicago on March 19, 1995 that the Jews financed the Holocaust:

German Jews financed Hitler right here in America. ... International bankers financed Hitler and poor Jews died while big Jews were at the root of what you call the Holocaust. ... Little Jews died while big Jews made money. Little Jews [were] being turned into soap while big Jews washed themselves with it. Jews [were] playing violin, Jews [were] playing music, while other Jews [were] marching into the gas chambers.

Khalid Abdul Muhammad, a former advisor to Farrakhan, stated that the Jews deserved to be exterminated by the Nazis. Echoing white supremacist propaganda, he holds that Jewish people undermined German society, and thus deserved to be targeted by the Nazis.

You see, everybody always talk about Hitler exterminating 6 million Jews ... but don't nobody ever asked what did they do to Hitler? What did they do to them folks? They went in there, in Germany, the way they do everywhere they go, and they supplanted, they usurped, they turned around, and a German, in his own country, would almost have to go to a Jew to get money. They had undermined the very fabric of the society.

== Cooperation with antisemitic groups ==
=== Holocaust deniers ===
The Nation of Islam's official position does not deny the Jewish holocaust. Tim Russert, during a 1997 Meet the Press interview with Louis Farrakhan, posed the question, "Do you believe there was a Holocaust in which 6 million Jews perished?"

Of course I believe that Jews perished in Germany, and (those) same Jews perished in Germany while the Pope Pius XII looked the other way and the government of America looked the other way. Now there is reconciliation between Jews and Catholics and the government of the United States. What is wrong with reconciliation between those who looked the other way when my fathers were being brought into America as slaves, and to this very moment have not received justice? I think atonement, reconciliation, and responsibility should be the watch word for this time, and I am willing to sit down with any who wish to discuss atonement, reconciliation, and responsibility.

== Relationship with white supremacists ==
Elijah Muhammad's pro-separation views were compatible with those of some white supremacist organizations in the 1960s. He reportedly met with leaders of the Ku Klux Klan in 1961 to work toward the purchase of farmland in the Deep South. He eventually established Temple Farms, now Muhammad Farms, on a 5,000-acre (20 km^{2}) tract in Terrell County, Georgia. George Lincoln Rockwell, founder of the American Nazi Party once called Muhammad "the Hitler of the black man." At the 1962 Saviours' Day celebration in Chicago, Rockwell addressed Nation of Islam members. Many in the audience booed and heckled him and his men, for which Muhammad rebuked them in the April 1962 issue of Muhammad Speaks.

== See also ==
- African American–Jewish relations
- Antisemitism in the Arab world
- Antisemitism in Islam
- Antisemitism in the United States#Nation of Islam
- Anti-Zionism#Islamic perspectives
- Black-Palestinian solidarity
- Conspiracy theory
- Holocaust denial
- History of the Jews under Muslim rule
- Islamic–Jewish relations
- Jewish exodus from the Muslim world
- Racism in the Arab world
- Racism in Muslim communities
- Black supremacy
- Relations between Nazi Germany and the Arab world
- Xenophobia and racism in the Middle East

== Notes ==
=== Works cited ===
- Lomax, Louis E. (1963). When the Word Is Given: A Report on Elijah Muhammad, Malcolm X, and the Black Muslim World. Cleveland: World Publishing. OCLC 1071204.
- Marable, Manning; Felber, Garrett (January 16, 2013). The Portable Malcolm X Reader: A Man Who Stands for Nothing Will Fall for Anything. Penguin. ISBN 978-1-101-60294-2.
- Moore, R. Laurence (1987). Religious Outsiders and the Making of Americans. Oxford University Press. ISBN 978-0-19-536399-9.
- Norwood, Stephen H. (2013). Antisemitism and the American Far Left. Cambridge University Press. ISBN 978-1-107-03601-7.
- Norwood, Stephen H.; Pollack, Eunice G. (2020). "White Devils, Satanic Jews: The Nation of Islam From Fard to Farrakhan". Modern Judaism – A Journal of Jewish Ideas and Experience. 40 (2): 137–168. doi:10.1093/mj/kjaa006 – via Oxford University Press.
- Pollack, Eunice G. (2013). Racializing Antisemitism: Black Militants, Jews, and Israel 1950-present (PDF). Vidal Sassoon International Center for the Study of Antisemitism, Henrew University of Israel.
- Pollack, Eunice G. (2022). "Black Antisemitism in America: Past and Present" (PDF). Institute for National Security Studies.
