= American Society of Muslims =

Muslim organization in the US

The American Society of Muslims (ASM) was a Sunni Muslim organization in the United States that operated between 1988 and the early 2000s. It was created and led by Warith Deen Mohammed and its membership consisted predominantly of African-American Muslims.

Warith Deen Mohammad had been the son of Elijah Muhammad, the second leader of the Nation of Islam (NOI). After Elijah Muhammad died in 1975, Warith Deen Mohammad took control of the NOI. He increasingly rejected the NOI's idiosyncratic teachings and sought to align it more closely with Sunni Islam. In 1976, he renamed the NOI as the World Community of al-Islam in the West and then again, in 1978, to the American Muslim Mission. In 1985 he disbanded this Mission. He remained active in Sunni circles and in 1988 established his new organization, the ASM. Warith Deen Mohammed retired as the leader of the association in 2003 and established a charity called The Mosque Cares. Without him, the ASM functionally ceased to exist.

== History ==
=== Background ===
After the 1975 death of Elijah Muhammad, his son, Warith Deen Mohammed, became the leader of the Nation of Islam. He rejected many of his father's views, including black separatism and belief in the divinity of Wallace Fard Muhammad, founder of the Nation of Islam. He was "determined to bring it into conformity with mainstream Islam". In 1976 he changed the name of the organization to World Community of Islam in the West. In 1981 it changed again to American Muslim Mission, a name that was retained until 1985.

On September 10, 1978, in an address in Atlanta, Georgia, Warith Deen Mohammed resigned from his position as Chief Imam of the World Community of Al-Islam in the West and appointed a Consultative Body of Imams (A'immah) to oversee the activities of the Community. Upon his resignation, Warith Deen Mohammed pledged to serve as an ambassador at large for the community. This was his first step in separating his ministry from the narrow confines of the Nation of Islam/World Community of Islam. The original Council of Imams, according to Warith Deen Mohammed, would consist of the 6 Imams over the Regions.

In 1977, Louis Farrakhan resigned from Warith Deen Mohammed's reformed organization. With a number of supporters, he decided to rebuild the original Nation of Islam upon the foundation established by Wallace Fard Muhammad and Elijah Muhammad.

The Mission faced problems following protracted legal challenges caused by financial claims on the estate of Elijah Muhammad made on behalf of children he had fathered out of wedlock. In 1985, Wallace Muhammad disbanded his Mission, telling his followers to affiliate instead with their local mosques. He declared that in disbanding the group, he was making a statement that "we are members of the worldwide Muslim community... not to be identified in geographic terms or political terms or racial terms".

=== Formation of the American Society of Muslims ===
Despite the Mission's legal dissolution, a movement around Warith Deen Mohammad continued informally. A legal judgement in 1987 forced the sale of $10 million worth of property. Warith Deen Mohammed sold a number of properties to Farrakhan, including Temple No. 2, the headquarters mosque, which was purchased with a donation to Farrakhan from Muammar Gaddafi.

In 2002, the American Society of Muslims was estimated to have nearly 2.5 million followers, "with a percentage of immigrant and naturalized American citizens from various Muslim ethnic peoples, European Americans, and a majority of African Americans representing five generations since the earliest history of Elijah Mohammed's leadership (1933) and in some cases before".

=== Warith Deen Mohammad's departure ===
Warith Deen Mohammed resigned from the leadership of the American Society of Muslims on August 31, 2003, and established The Mosque Cares. He gave as his reason for resigning that the imams within the organization continued to resist his reforms.

On December 21, 2003, Warith Deen Mohammed gave his blessing to an attempt by Imam Mustafa El-Amin to maintain the ASM as an organization. El-Amin advertised in The Muslim Journal, expressing solidarity with the aims of the former leader. El-Amin received little support, and the ASM did not reorganize. After Warith Deen Mohammed's death in 2008, its members have identified as the "Community of Imam Warith Deen Mohammed" or simply "Muslim Americans", and its national activities have been largely organized by The Mosque Cares, run by one of Warith Deen Mohammed's sons, Wallace D. Mohammed II.

== Programs and aim ==
=== Publications ===
In 1975, Warith Deen Muhammad's followers established a newspaper, Bilalian News, which was named after the early African Muslim Bilal ibn Rabah. In 1981 it became The Muslim Journal. As of 2006, it was edited by Ayesha K. Mustapha.

=== Education ===
After Elijah Mohammed's death, Warith Deen Mohammed transformed the Muhammad University of Islam into the Clara Muhammad Schools, or simply Mohammed Schools, replacing the University of Islam founded by his father. The school system is "an association of approximately 75 elementary, secondary, and high schools throughout the United States and the Caribbean Islands." The schools have been described by Zakiyyah Muhammad of the American Educational Research Association as "models of Islamic education that are achieving commendable results".

== See also ==
- Islam in the African diaspora
