= Wallace Fard Muhammad =

Founder of the Nation of Islam (c. 1877 – disappeared c. 1934)

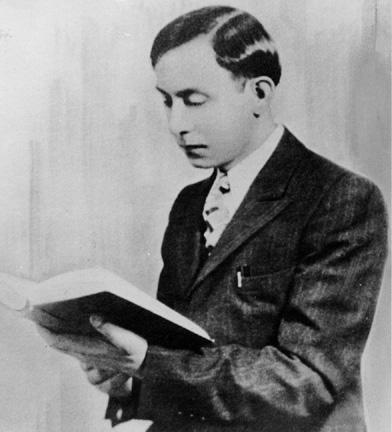
- Fard's official portrait c. 1932

First Leader of the Nation of Islam
- In office 1930–1934
- Preceded by: Position established
- Succeeded by: Elijah Muhammad

Personal details
- Born: Date uncertain; NOI tradition claims February 26, 1877 (Note: Birth dates attributed to Fard include 1877, 1883, 1884, 1891, and 1893; the Nation of Islam celebrates February 26, 1877.) Place uncertain; NOI tradition claims Mecca; other theories include: British India; Shinkay, Afghanistan; New Zealand; British Hong Kong
- Disappeared: 1934 (aged 56–57) (Note: Age based on his official birthdate as claimed by the NOI)
- Died: Date, cause, and place of death are unknown
- Other names: Wali Fred Dad; Fred the Greek; Fred the Turk; Wallie Dodd Fard; Wallace Dodd Ford; William D. Fard; Master Fard Muhammad
- Occupations: Religious and political activist
- Spouses: Pearl Allen (m. 1914; div. 1914) Hazel Barton (after 1919) (common law) Carmen Treviño (m. 1924)
- Children: With Hazel: Wallace Dodd Fard (later Wallace Max Ford)

Wallace Fard Muhammad or W. D. Fard (Note: Other names Fard went by include Master Fard Muhammad.) (/fəˈrɑːd/ fə-RAHD; reportedly born February 26, c. 1877 (Note: The years 1891 and 1893 have both been cited by sources relying upon FBI records and genealogical records. The FBI file on Fard provides both dates but states: "Our investigation of the NOI and Fard failed to establish his birth date and birth place." According to the NOI, Fard reportedly claimed to have been born in 1877 and that he hailed from Mecca.) – disappeared c. 1934) was a religious leader who was the founder of the Nation of Islam.

Fard arrived in Detroit in 1930 with an ambiguous background and several aliases and proselytized syncretic Islamic teachings to the city's black population. His group taught followers to abandon their old "slave names" in favor of new names that were bestowed on new members. Fard's movement similarly taught Black pride and Black exceptionalism, saying that the black man is the "original" man and teaching that the white race were devils created by a scientist named Yakub via eugenics. The group preached abstinence from drugs, alcohol, pork, and out-of-wedlock sex.

After one of Fard's followers performed a human sacrifice (murder of James J. Smith), Fard was briefly arrested, but the police ordered him to depart Detroit and not return. Instead he continued to return to the city, where he was spotted by police. In 1934, after repeated arrests and death threats, Fard left Detroit and ultimately disappeared.

Elijah Muhammad succeeded Fard as leader of the Nation of Islam. Fard's teachings in turn influenced many, including Malcolm X, Clarence 13X, Muhammad Ali, and, indirectly, Kareem Abdul-Jabbar. The Nation of Islam celebrates Saviour's Day every February 26 in his honor.

== Early life ==
In the 1950s, the FBI publicly claimed that prior to his time in Detroit, Fard had been known as Wallace Ford, a California restaurateur.

Fard's origins are uncertain. He variously claimed to have been born in Afghanistan and Spain. The Nation of Islam traditionally taught that he was an Arab from Mecca, while the FBI later identified him as Wallace Dodd Ford, a man allegedly born in New Zealand. Other theories proposed by scholars include South Asian, African American, and several other ethnic origins.

Scholars like A. K. Arian believed that Fard immigrated to the United States on a vessel called the SS Tremont that arrived in Port Townsend in 1904, where he was named "Khanialam Khan". Khanialam's younger brother, Sher Khan, was thought to have later applied for American citizenship listing his birthplace as Balochistan, a region part of Pakistan since the Partition of India. Khanialam Khan or Alam Khan, like Fard, had been a tamale vendor in Oregon. However, in 2025, new research by Kevin Morris and Anton Batey shows that the immigrant Khanialam Khan was not Fard, as he later took the name Khan Alley and died on November 19, 1958, in Lodi, California. Batey and Morris uncovered a manifest revealing that someone named "Wallie Dad Khan" travelled from Hong Kong to San Francisco in 1907 on the SS Coptic. Wallie Dad Khan was associated with tamale vendors and Fard was known to have later used the name "Wali Dadd". They also showed that the Sher Khan who was Khanialam's brother was not the same person as the man who applied for citizenship.

On his World War I draft card, Fard identified as a citizen of Afghanistan, born in Shinka. Many scholars argue that Fard may have been from the Indian subcontinent. Fard reportedly spent time at the Ahmadiyya Mosque (a movement prominent in Pakistan), used translations of the Quran from South Asian Muslims, and bestowed South Asian Muslim names on followers. Fard's teaching of the Tribe of Shabazz may have been tied to Pakistan's Shrine of Lal Shahbaz Qalandar.

In 1924, when he married a woman of Spanish ancestry, Carmen Treviño, Fard claimed he had been born in Madrid, Spain. Less popular theories of origin suggest he may have been Syrian, Moroccan, Bosnian, Albanian, African-American, or Jewish. Fard was traditionally held by the Nation of Islam to be an Arab from Mecca.

=== Oregon ===
Prior to his time in Detroit, Fard operated a food cart and later restaurant in Oregon and California. In 1908, papers in Eugene, Oregon, announced that local tamale vendor Fred Walldad (nicknamed "Fred the Turk") had acquired a small house on wheels to use as a food cart ("Turk" at that point in US history often simply meant a Muslim regardless of ethnicity). That Halloween, papers reported on a "Halloween prank" in which local boys took the wheels off Fred the Turk's tamale wagon and dropped it, breaking Fred's dishes and eggs, as well as injuring Fred himself; the wheel was stolen. By the following February, he had sold his lunchwagon and moved to Cottage Grove, where he had leased a restaurant and lodging house.

By 1912, Fard was again selling tamales, this time in Salem, Oregon; newspapers reported on vendor Fred Dadd, a naturalized American originally from New Zealand, attending his first baseball game. In 1913, Fard penned an announcement in the newspaper complaining about police harassment. His complaint of police harassment would be investigated by the police committee. After the committee reported and the report was adopted, the mayor instructed the chief of police to allow Dodd to sell his wares.

In 1914, Fard was arrested for allegedly inducing Laura E. Swanson to leave her spouse for him; he was released on $1,000 bond. A March 23 report cited Dodd's charge as "assaulting a married woman". On April 20, 1914, Dodd married Pearl Allen, a white-passing member of the Klamath people, in Multnomah County, Oregon. The following day, April 21, a jury acquitted Dodd. The Capital Journal explained the verdict by saying "It was brought out in the cross examination of the complaining witness that there was another person in the house at the time of the alleged assault and that she did not cry for help as a person in her circumstances would be aroused."

The marriage to Pearl was short-lived; divorce proceedings began by August 30. On November 14, he was arrested for larceny after allegedly stealing from Pearl. Pearl gave birth to a son the following year, though a 2024 DNA test suggested more likely than not that this son was not biologically descended from Dodd.

=== Los Angeles and San Quentin ===
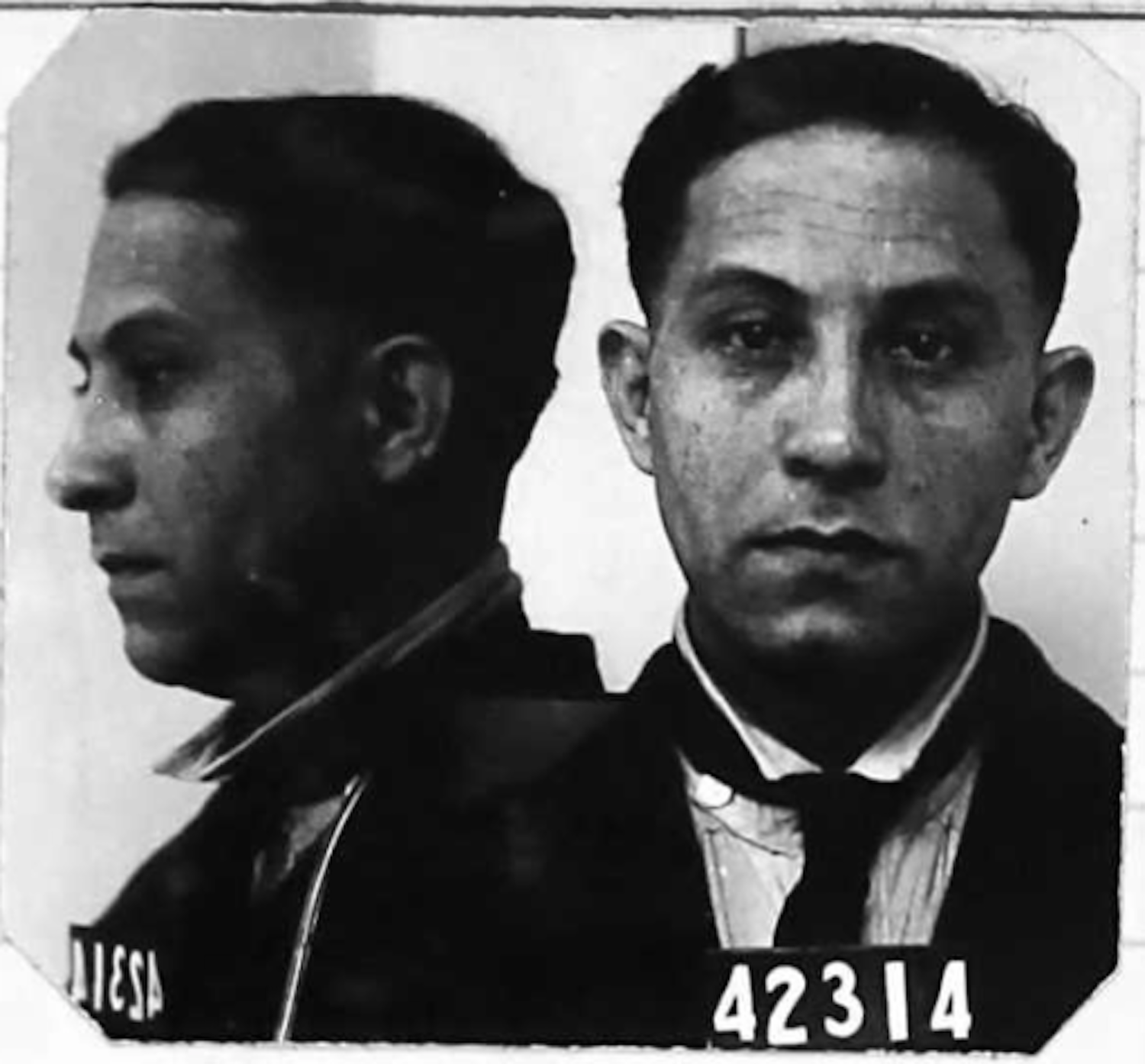
Wallie Dodd Ford mugshot in 1926

Fard moved to Los Angeles, using the name Wallie Dodd Ford, where he owned a restaurant "Wallie's cafe". at 803 W. Third Street. The Nation of Islam contests the claim that Wallace Fard Muhammad and Wallie Dodd Ford were the same person.

Ford was arrested by Los Angeles police on November 17, 1918, on a charge of assault with a deadly weapon. As of 1920, Ford was still living in Los Angeles as 26-year-old Wallie D. Ford, with his 25-year-old common law wife, Hazel E. Ford (née Barton) The pair had a son, Wallie Dodd Ford Jr. in 1920.

Soon after the birth of their son, however, Hazel found out that Ford went under many aliases and had not been honest with her regarding many other matters. Hazel subsequently left Ford and he is said to have become depressed and started abusing drugs and alcohol.

A marriage certificate, dated June 5, 1924, was issued to Wallie Dodd Ford and Carmen Treviño, a Mexican-born woman of Spanish ancestry, in Santa Ana, California.

Ford was arrested again on January 20, 1926, for violation of the California Woolwine Possession Act, and on February 15, 1926, for violation of the State Poison Act. After this second arrest, a Spanish-language paper in Los Angeles described him as a "street politician". Ford was sentenced to six months to six years at San Quentin State Prison on June 12, 1926. Ford was paroled from San Quentin on May 27, 1929.

=== In Chicago ===
In the 1930 census, Fard was listed as a resident of Chicago, with stated occupation of clothing salesman. Scholars speculate that Fard's Nation of Islam might have been influenced by the Moorish Science Temple in Chicago. Both groups saw "Negroes" as Afro-Asiatic, bestowed new names to replace "slave names", and promoted wearing of the fez.

According to some accounts, Fard was known within the temple as David Ford-el, and claimed (or was taken by some) to be the reincarnation of temple founder Drew Ali. When his leadership was rejected, Ford El broke away from the Moorish Science Temple and moved to Detroit.

== Fard in Detroit (1930–1934) ==
Fard first appeared in Detroit in 1930; his followers cite July 4, 1930, as the date of his arrival. A door-to-door salesman, Fard spread his religious teachings throughout Detroit, and within three years grew the movement to a reported 25,000 members in Detroit, Chicago, and other cities.

=== Clothing peddler ===
Fard began by selling Oriental silks door-to-door in Detroit's black section. Fard visited the homes of black families who had recently migrated to Detroit from the rural South. Fard told black residents that his silks were the same kind that their ancestors in Mecca had used and claimed to be a traveler from that land. When offered food, Fard reportedly ate what was provided but would advise residents to avoid certain foods, promising health benefits would follow. At his suggestion, he came back to teach the residents, along with guests.

=== Bible study leader at house churches ===
In the early stage of his ministry, Fard used the Bible as his textbook, since it was the only religious book with which the majority of his audience were familiar. Patrick D. Bowen writes that in the early Nation of Islam, "ministers regularly referenced passages from the Bible to prove their claims". Fard's successor Elijah Muhammad would later claim Fard "knew the Bible better than any of the Christian-bred Negroes". Lomax wrote that Fard was "well-versed" in the Bible, used it as a textbook and taught in the style of a Southern Baptist preacher.

Beynon writes that "With growing prestige over a constantly increasing group, [Fard] became bolder in his denunciation of white people and began to attack the teachings of the Bible in such a way as to shock his audience and bring them to an emotional crisis."

Fard taught a form of black exceptionalism and self-pride to poor Southern blacks during the Great Northward Migration at a time when ideas of scientific racism were prevalent. He advocated that community members establish and own their own businesses, eat healthy food, raise families, and refrain from drugs and alcohol. In 1938, sociologist Erdmann Doane Beynon published in the American Journal of Sociology a firsthand account of several interviews he conducted with followers of Fard in Michigan. From those interviews, Beynon wrote that Fard had lived and taught in Detroit from 1930 to 1934.

=== Giver of new names ===
Fard taught his followers to reject surnames inherited from white slaveowners. As part of their initiation into the group, Fard bestowed new Muslim names upon his converts. He taught that this practice restored their original and true identities, while also revealing the lies that cloaked the origins of the so-called Asiatic Blackman. Such names included Muhammad, Ali, Karriem, and Fardan. Scholars note that new names had previously been given by Noble Drew Ali of the Moorish Science Temple of America, who assigned surnames El and Bey; the term "slave name" was used by the MSTA.

After Fard's disappearance, Elijah Muhammad continued the practice of giving new Muslim names to converts to the Nation of Islam and added the letter X, symbolizing the unknown, instead of a name.

=== Leader of the Allah Temple of Islam ===
Beynon's interviewees told him that reports of Fard's message spread throughout the black community. Attendance at the house meetings grew until the listeners were divided into groups and taught in shifts. Finally, the community contributed money and rented a hall to serve as a temple where meetings were conducted. The Quran was soon introduced as the most authoritative of all texts for the study of the faith. Fard prepared texts that served as authoritative manuals of the faith and were memorized verbatim by his followers.

According to Beynon, Fard's followers grew to approximately 8,000, and "[w]ithin three years the prophet not only began the movement but organized it so well that he himself was able to recede into the background, appearing almost never to his followers during the final months of his residence in Detroit."

During this time, Clara Poole, later renamed Clara Muhammad, was introduced to Fard and his teachings through her in-laws. His teachings gave Poole hope and presented her life with new possibilities and new memories. After one of Fard's services, during which he asked if someone knew Elijah Poole, Clara introduced him and his teachings to her husband, Elijah Poole, who later became Elijah Muhammad. His guidance and teachings eventually changed and reformed Elijah Poole into a responsible and ideal husband, who would later become the face and leader of the Nation of Islam.

From interviews with approximately 200 families who followed Fard, Beynon concluded:

Although the prophet lived in Detroit from July 4, 1930 until June 30, 1934, virtually nothing is known about him, save that he 'came from the East' and that he 'called' the Negroes of North America to enter the Nation of Islam. His very name is uncertain. He was known usually as Mr. Wali Farrad or Mr. W. D. Fard, though he used also the following names: Professor Ford, Mr. Farrad Mohammed, Mr. F. Mohammed Ali. One of the few survivors who heard his first addresses states that he himself said: 'My name is W. D. Fard and I came from the Holy City of Mecca. More about myself I will not tell you yet, for the time has not yet come. I am your brother. You have not yet seen me in my royal robes.' Legends soon sprang up about this mysterious personality.

Around October 1932, Fard appointed 17-year-old Burnsteen Sharrieff Mohammed his personal secretary. Given the title "Reformer", she recalled:

"Every Tuesday, we had a picnic with Muslims only. We danced, played games; especially baseball. At the picnic we would win prizes. Master W. D. Fard Muhammad would always have something to give us, especially his laborers. Everybody wanted to win, so the competition was high. One of the contests was dancing with Master W. D. Fard, and on his head sat a full glass of water... I was reluctant and fearful that I would cause the glass to fall. I danced as best as I knew, stumbling along. I was so nervous until he let me go and took another girl to dance, and she won the prize. Master W. D. Fard's dance was called the Waltz. He said the Waltz was original music."

She further reflected on Fard's theology, "He taught us that the Black people were the God, so when I would say my prayers, I'd shut my eyes and envision that great mass of people as God."

In 1933, Fard began signing his name "W. F. Muhammad", which stood for Wallace Fard Muhammad, and used it on several lessons written in 1933 and 1934.

=== Smith killing drives Fard from Detroit (1932) ===
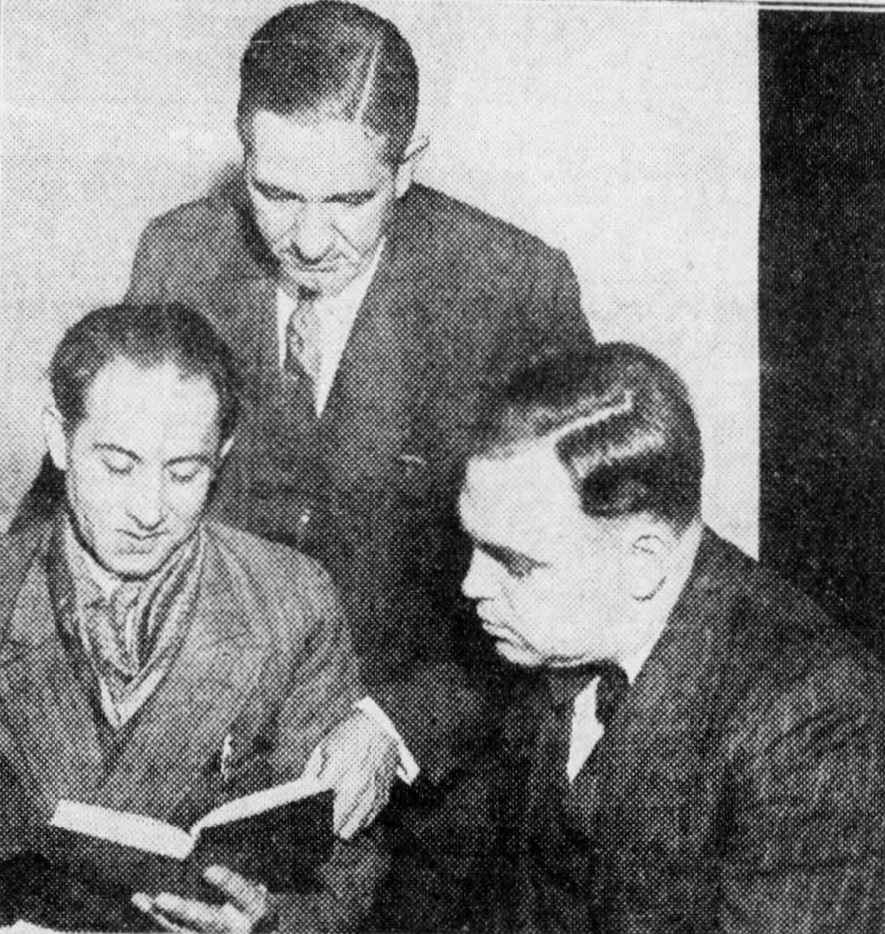
Fard, left, showing a book to police detectives. The photo was published by the Detroit Free Press on November 24, 1932, four days after the Harris murder.

On November 20, 1932, Robert Harris (who had received the name Robert Karriem from Fard) escorted James J. Smith into a room with a makeshift altar. In the audience were twelve adult witnesses and Harris's wife and children. Smith, who believed he was being inducted into the Allah Temple of Islam, was asked if he would sacrifice his life for Islam, and Smith nodded his assent. Harris then stabbed Smith in the chest, and proceeded to bludgeon him to death with an axle rod. (Note: Beynon stated that Fard's position on human sacrifice "was never made clear.")

After neighbors called the police, Harris was arrested. Under questioning, he confessed to the murder: "I had to kill somebody, I could not forsake my gods". Police initiated a manhunt for Fard and another leader, Ugan Ali, who were arrested and questioned. Harris was deemed insane and committed to a mental hospital. "The society cannot be blamed for anything he did," Ali was quoted as saying in the Detroit News, which falsely suggested the murder was tied to the practice of Voodoo. Fard and Ugan Ali, who acknowledged leadership of the Allah Temple of Islam but vehemently denied any teaching of human sacrifice, were examined by psychiatrist David Clark, who recommended they be committed for further observation. A judge agreed, and both Fard and Ugan Ali were placed in straitjackets and confined in padded cells.

With Fard and Ugan Ali still in custody five days after the murder, Elijah Muhammad, at the time known as Elijah Karriem, led over two hundred members into the court building and staged a protest on the main floor. The police spent a full day expelling the protesters.

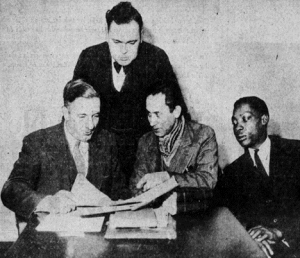
Fard Muhammad (center) showing a book to police detectives (left) while Fard's chief aide Ugan Ali (right) sits nearby

On November 25, Harris was arraigned on charges of first-degree murder; he pleaded guilty, but his bizarre courtroom behavior convinced witnesses of his insanity. On December 6, three psychiatrists testified that Harris was legally insane, and he was committed to the Ionia State Hospital for the Criminal Insane; he died there on June 19, 1935. Faced with criminal charges, Ugan Ali was released after promising to help disband the Allah Temple of Islam, while Fard agreed to forever leave Detroit as a condition of release.

On December 7, 1932, police put Fard on a train bound for Chicago. The Allah Temple of Islam was officially disbanded, though soon replaced by a new organization called the Nation of Islam. Former leader Ugan Ali was replaced by Elijah Muhammad.

=== Fard in exile and the Nation of Islam (1932–1934) ===
In January 1933, Fard snuck back into Detroit and held secret meetings with followers. Fard left Detroit for a few weeks but returned to Detroit and resumed preaching on street corners. Recognized by police, he was arrested on May 25, booked, and photographed. He was again released and ordered to depart the city.

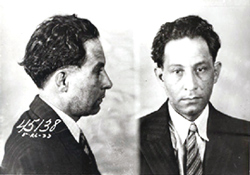
W. D. Fard mugshot on May 25, 1933, after he was arrested for returning to Detroit

Fard renamed his community the "Nation of Islam". Following the rapid increase in membership, he instituted a formal organizational structure. He established the Muslim Girls' Training and General Civilization Class, where women were taught how to keep their houses, clean, and cook. The men of the organization were drilled by captains and referred to as the Fruit of Islam. The entire movement was placed under a Minister of Islam.

On September 26, Fard was arrested in Chicago by local police while addressing an audience in a rented hall. The following morning, the Chicago judge Dunn dismissed charges of disturbing the peace and released Fard. Fard made a third surreptitious visit to Detroit, this time preaching that the white man would soon be destroyed by poison bombs.

Fard established the University of Islam, where school-aged children were taught, as an alternative to Detroit public schools. By January 1934, local truant officers had noticed the pattern of dropouts and alerted authorities. On March 27, the Detroit Free Press proclaimed that the "voodoo cult" had been revived, and the city initiated legal action against the school. The school was raided by police, and Elijah Muhammad was arrested.

Press reported that at trial, 15-year-old Sally Ali, who had attended the University of Islam, testified that she had been taught "in the Islamic New Deal that if she cut off the heads of four devils—devils being unrighteous people—she would win a free trip to Mecca and a button of some sort." She further testified that she had been taught that Caucasians would be destroyed in the year 1934 by poison gas and fighting. Elijah Muhammad was found guilty for his role in establishing an unlicensed school, but he was released on probation. Amid rumors that police wanted both Fard and his chief aide dead, Elijah Muhammad fled for Chicago, and Fard was never again seen by most residents of Detroit.

== Final years ==
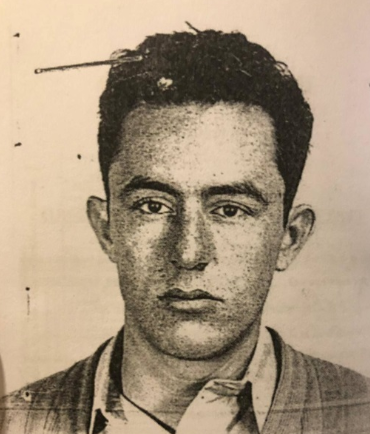
Fard's son, Wallace Jr., pictured in 1941

It is not known what became of Fard or the circumstances of his death. Though he was a naturalized citizen, he may have been forced to accept voluntary deportation. In 1932, the Escanaba Daily Press reported that he had been awaiting an immigration hearing. It has been speculated that Fard used the alias of Mohammed A. Khan, who was arrested in Gary, Indiana, due to violating immigration laws, on December 4, 1933.

After he had departed Detroit, Fard visited Hazel Barton, the mother of his child, in Los Angeles; she recalled him only eating one meal per day as part of his new lifestyle, which is consistent with the practice Fard advocated as part of the Nation of Islam. Hazel recalled he was driving a new car with California plates, with white sheets covering the seats. He left the sheets with her, saying he was going "back to New Zealand".

Fard's last known contact with the Nation of Islam was a letter sent from Mexico which was received in March 1934. Morrow speculates that Fard might have tried to return to the US under another name.

For decades after Fard's disappearance, Elijah Muhammad maintained that Fard was alive and well. Fard allegedly suffered from diabetes and had to carry sugar packets; Morrow notes the possibility that Fard might have died not long after his disappearance.

== Ideology ==
Beynon described the substance of Fard's teaching as follows:

The black men in North America are not Negroes, but members of the lost tribe of Shabazz, stolen by traders from the Holy City of Mecca 379 years ago. The prophet came to America to find and to bring back to life his long lost brethren, from whom the Caucasians had taken away their language, their nation and their religion. Here in America they were living other than themselves. They must learn that they are the original people, noblest of the nations of the earth. The Caucasians are the colored people, since they have lost their original color. The original people must regain their religion, which is Islam, their language, which is Arabic, and their culture, which is astronomy and higher mathematics, especially calculus. They must live according to the law of Allah, avoiding all meat of 'poison animals', hogs, ducks, geese, possums and catfish. They must give up completely the use of stimulants, especially liquor. They must clean themselves up – both their bodies and their houses. If in this way they obeyed Allah, he would take them back to the Paradise from which they had been stolen – the Holy City of Mecca.

Fard's lessons themselves state that the "traders" referenced by Beynon came to Africa, not Mecca.

Modern Nation of Islam theology is based upon the belief that Fard's teaching of Elijah Muhammad was fulfillment of scripture regarding God's teaching of an Apostle, where Fard is described as "God in Person", the "Messiah", and the "Mahdi". Fard wrote the following for his followers:

[T]he LESSONS that OUR SAVIOUR (ALLAH) gave us to Study and Learn is the Fulfillment of the Prophecies of All the Former Prophets concerning the Beginning of the Devils, and the Ending of the Civilization, and of our Enslavement by the Devils, and Present Time of our Delivery from the Devils by OUR SAVIOUR (ALLAH). PRAISE HIS HOLY NAME! There is No God but ALLAH. How that ALLAH would separate us from the Devils and, then destroy them; and Change us into a New and Perfect People; and Fill the Earth with FREEDOM, JUSTICE and EQUALITY as it was filled with wickedness; and Making we, the Poor Lost-Founds, the Perfect RULERS.

In Elijah Muhammad's 1965 book Message to the Blackman in America, which is a compilation of articles written for newspapers throughout the early part of his ministry, Muhammad summarized what Fard taught him as follows:

He began teaching us the knowledge of ourselves, of God and the devil, of the measurement of the earth, of other planets, and of the civilization of some of the planets other than earth. ... He measured and weighed the earth and its water; the history of the moon; the history of the two nations, black and white, that dominate the earth. He gave the exact birth of the white race; the name of their God who made them and how; and the end of their time, the judgment, how it will begin and end. ... He taught us the truth of how we were made 'slaves' and how we are kept in slavery by the 'slave-masters' children. He declared the doom of America, for her evils to us was past due. And that she is number one to be destroyed. Her judgment could not take place until we hear the truth. ... He declared that we were without the knowledge of self or anyone else. How we had been made blind, deaf and dumb by this white race of people and how we must return to our people, our God and His religion of peace (Islam), the religion of the prophets. We must give up the slave names of our slave-masters and accept the name of Allah (God) or one of His divine attributes. He also taught us to give up all evil doings and practices and do righteousness or be destroyed from the face of the earth. He taught us that the slave-masters had taught us to eat the wrong food and that this is the cause of our sickness and short span of life. He declared that he would heal us and set us in heaven at once, if we would submit to Him. Otherwise he would chastise us with a severe chastisement until we did submit. And that He was able to force the whole world into submission to his will. He said that he loved us (the so-called Negroes), his lost and found, so well that he would eat rattlesnakes to free us if necessary, for he has power over all things.

Part of Fard's teaching also involved admiration for Japan.

Both during and after his life, some charged that Fard was a conman who used mystery and charisma to swindle poor blacks, selling them new Muslim names and stirring up racial animosity by copying selected elements of other Muslim religious sects and ideologies that fit his racial supremacist narrative.

=== Influences ===
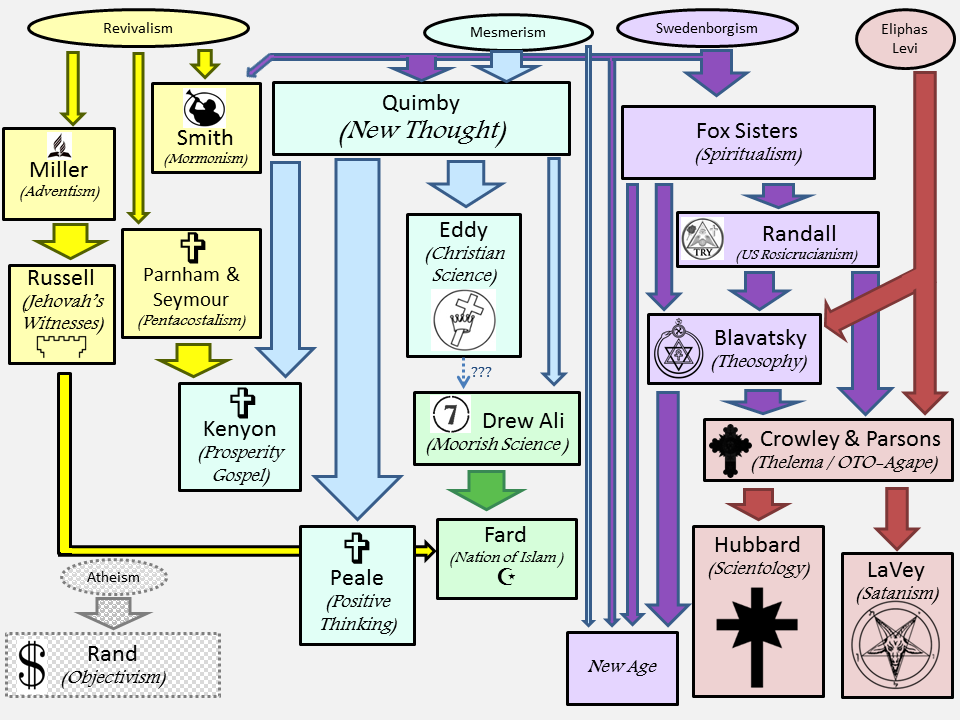
Scholars argue that Fard's movement was influenced by Moorish Science and Jehovah's Witnesses

Fard was influenced by the Jehovah's Witness movement, Freemasonry (especially the Shriners), Marcus Garvey, Moorish Science, in addition to Islam.

The teaching of the Jehovah's Witnesses has been called "the most obvious non-Islamic source for [Fard's] teachings". Fard was known to teach from what a Detroit newspaper described as "The Bible of Islam"; in 2023, the book was identified as Deliverance! by Joseph Franklin Rutherford, of the Watch Tower Society or Jehovah's Witnesses. Fard recommended radio broadcasts by Rutherford, Frank Norris, and other millennial preachers. Jehovah's Witness founder Charles Taze Russell, like Fard, interpreted the year 1914 as the beginning of an apocalypse. Both groups instructed members to refuse compulsory military service. Both groups taught that souls were not immortal, that there was no afterlife, and that heaven and hell were states of life on Earth rather than allegories.

Fard encouraged students to read James Henry Breasted's Conquest of Civilization, Hendrick van Loon's The Story of Mankind and books on Freemansonry. Fard recommended the writings of Henry Ford, and The Protocols of the Elders of Zion, an anti-Jewish forgery promoted by Ford. Police found literature by anti-Jewish preacher Gerald Burton Winrod.

Fard is believed to have been influenced by the Moorish Science Temple of America, which also assigned new names to members to replace their "slave name". Both groups taught African-Americans to identify as 'Asiatics', both groups wore the fez. Both groups met at "temples", not mosques. Freemasonry has similarly been thought to be a source of inspiration; Elijah Pool (later Elijah Muhammad) had been a Freemason before meeting Fard. Garveyism has similarly been cited an inspiration, with modern scholars noting Garvey's teachings were popular in San Quentin.

The Islamic scholar John Andrew Morrow summarizes Fard's teachings as rooted in "a wide variety of ideas from both East and West" including "Twelver Shi'ism, Sevener Shi'ism, Druzism, and Shi'ite Extremism, as well as Babism, Baha'ism, Yezidism, Ahmadism, and Sufism" Like Islam, Fard's teaching forbade drugs, alcohol, and pork; Fard also preached against 'slave foods' like ducks, geese, possums and catfish.

== Legacy ==
Fard influenced his successor Elijah Muhammad, Malcolm X, and many other Black nationalist thinkers. The annual Saviours' Day event is held in honor of Fard's birth. In 2020, it attracted an estimated 14,000 participants.

=== Continued deification under Elijah Muhammad ===
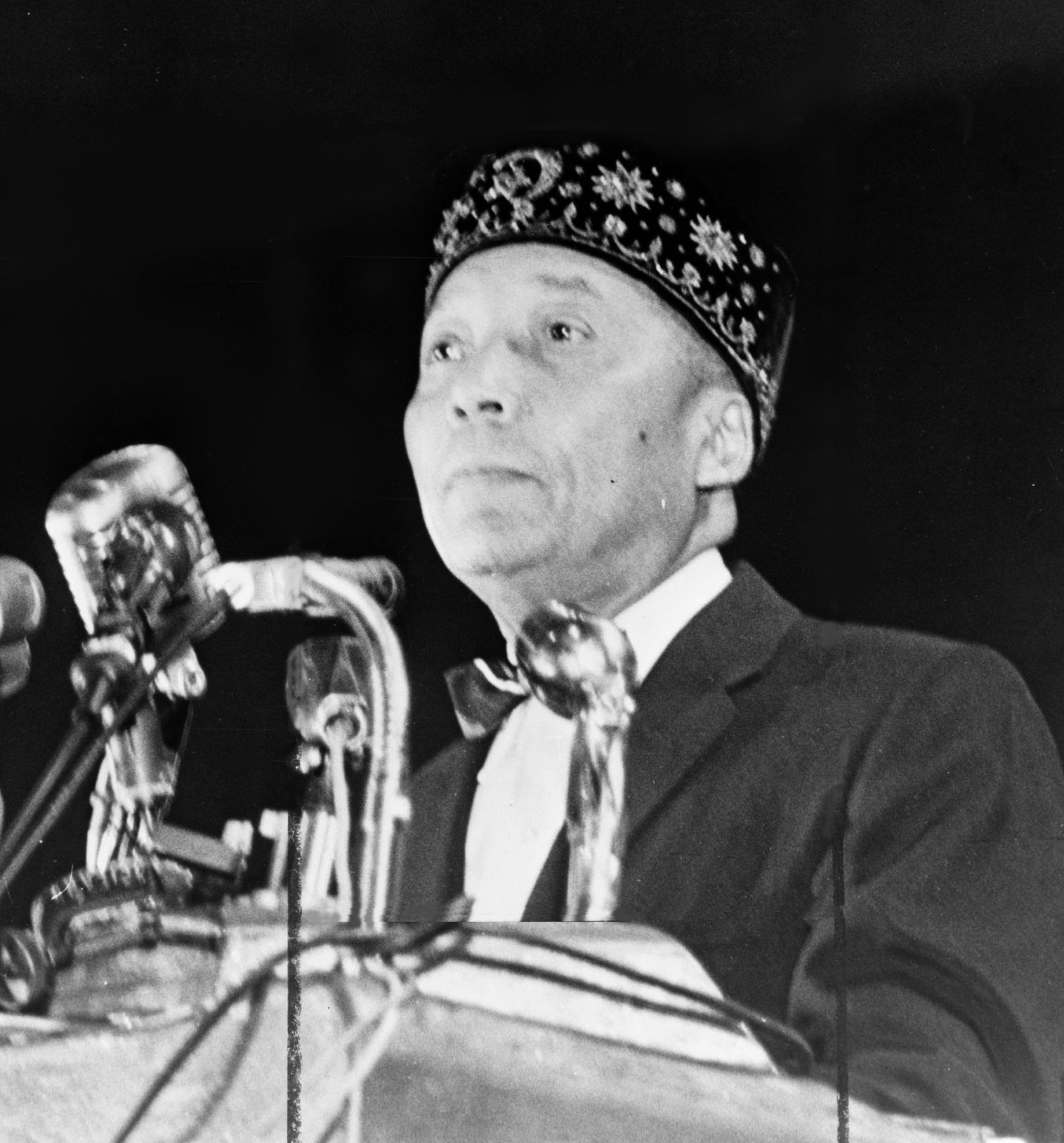
Elijah Muhammad in 1964

With regard to Elijah Muhammad, Beynon's article stated: "From among the larger group of Muslims there has sprung recently an even more militant branch than the Nation of Islam itself. This new movement, known as the Temple People. To Mr. Fard alone do they offer prayer and sacrifice. Since Mr. Fard has been deified, the Temple People raise the former Minister of Islam, now a resident of Chicago." This reference is in conflict with the first hand accounts of Malcolm X, such as his appearance in 1963 on the news program City Desk. Malcolm X states that Elijah Mohammed was neither Allah nor a Prophet, but rather that he was a Messenger. Elijah Muhammad, who led the Nation of Islam from 1934 to 1975, heard Fard teach for the first time in 1931. Elijah Muhammad stated that he and Fard became inseparable between 1931 and 1934, where he felt "jailed almost" due to the amount of time that they spent together with Fard teaching him day and night.

A handwritten lesson written by Fard states:

Twelve Leaders of Islam from all over the Planet have conferred in the Root of Civilization concerning the Lost-Found Nation of Islam – must return to their original Land. One of the Conference Members by the name of Mr. Osman Sharrieff said to the Eleven Members of the Conference: 'The Lost-Found Nation of Islam will not return to their original Land unless they, first, have a thorough Knowledge of their own.' So they sent a Messenger to them of their own. Now, the Messenger and his Laborers worked day and night for the last three and one-half years, and their accomplishments are approximately twenty-five thousand...

In this lesson, Fard places the number of converts obtained in Detroit at 25,000, and he describes a "Messenger" sent to the "Lost-Found Nation of Islam" who is "of their own". Nation of Islam theology states that this "Messenger" is Elijah Muhammad. Fard wrote, in his instructions to the leaders of his community, that they should "copy the Answers of Lesson of Minister Elijah Muhammad." He went on to state: "Why is Stress made to the Muslims to Copy, the Minister, Elijah Muhammad's Answers? The past History shows that the ALMIGHTY ALLAH sends Prophets and Apostles for the people's Guide and Example, and through them HIS Mystery was Revealed. And those who follow the Apostle would see the Light."

Fard wrote several lessons which are read and committed to memory by members of the Nation of Islam. (Note: Beynon refers to some of the lessons by Fard as an "oral tradition" that was recorded at the University of Islam as the "Secret Ritual of the Nation of Islam". See Beynon (1938), p. 898. Authors have subsequently attributed a text of this title to Fard. See Evanzz, supra at 81. However, Fard's lessons were individually written lessons later compiled in a single publication. See Muhammad (1993). Language attributed to Fard by author Karl Evanzz does not appear in any of the individually written lessons.) Some of the lessons are in the form of questions asked by Fard to Elijah Muhammad. One such lesson concludes with the text: "This Lesson No. 2 was given by our Prophet, W.D. Fard, which contains 40 questions answered by Elijah Muhammad, one of the lost found in the wilderness of North America February 20th, 1934."

While some scholars argue that Fard's divinity was a creation of Elijah Muhammad, Morrow points out that Fard did identify himself as God to Detroit police and that the psychiatrists who examined Fard after his arrest reported that Fard had delusions of Godhood. Morrow argues that under Elijah Muhammad, the doctrine of whites as devils was emphasized, while Fard had taught that "devils" were unbelievers of all races.

=== FBI Investigation ===
A declassified Federal Bureau of Investigation (FBI) memorandum dated May 16, 1957, states: "From a review of instant file it does not appear that there has been a concerted effort to locate and fully identify W. D. Fard. In as much as Elijah Muhammad recognizes W.D. Fard as being Allah (God) and claims that Fard is the source of all of his teachings, it is suggested that an exhaustive effort be made to fully identify and locate W. D. Fard and/or members of his family." The FBI took note of the article written by Erdmann Doane Beynon, and it conducted a search for Fard using various aliases including the name "Ford". On October 17, 1957, the FBI located and interviewed Hazel Barton-Ford, Wallie Ford's common-law wife, with whom he had a son named Wallace Dodd Ford, born on September 1, 1920. This son, later also known as Wallace Max Ford, died in 1942. He was serving for the United States Coast Guard, during World War II, at the time of his death. Barton-Ford gave a description of Wallie Ford, and described him as a Caucasian New Zealander. The FBI's search for Fard was officially closed the following year on April 15, 1958. Immigration records did not match any of his aliases.

On August 15, 1959, the FBI sent a story to the Chicago New Crusader newspaper, stating that Fard was a "Turkish-born Nazi agent who worked for Hitler in World War II". According to the FBI story, Fard was a "Muslim from Turkey who had come to the United States in the early 1900s. He had met Muhammad in prison … where the two men plotted a confidence game in which followers were charged a fee to become Muslims."

After the story was published, Elijah Muhammad and Malcolm X subsequently charged black media outlets, which reprinted the accusation in large numbers, with running the story without requesting a response from the Nation of Islam.

The FBI alleged that Fard was linked to the Pacific Movement of the Eastern World, a pro-Japanese movement of African Americans which promoted the idea that the Empire of Japan was the champion of all non-white peoples, and to senior members of the Black Dragon Society, such as Satokata Takahashi and Ashima Takis. The FBI charged that Takahashi had been an influential presence in the Nation of Islam. He spoke as a guest at the NOI temples in Detroit and Chicago. A February 19, 1963, FBI memorandum states: "In connection with efforts to disrupt and curb growth of the NOI, extensive research has been conducted into various files maintained by this office. Among the files reviewed was that of Wallace Dodd Ford." Five months later, in July 1963, the FBI told the Los Angeles Evening Herald-Examiner that Fard was actually Wallace Dodd Ford. The paper published the story in an article titled "Black Muslim Founder Exposed As White." An FBI memorandum dated August 1963 states that the FBI had not been able to verify his birthdate or birthplace, and "he was last heard from in 1934."

=== Demotion by Warith Deen Mohammed ===
Upon Elijah Muhammad's death in February 1975, his son Wallace (later Warith) was named successor and instituted sweeping reforms. Where his father has regarded Fard as a physical manifestation of Allah, Wallace denounced Fard as a human who "had his own designs on the black community". The group discontinued the annual Savior's Day celebration in honor of Fard.

Wallace brought the group closer to mainstream Sunni Islam, restyling their 'temples' as mosques while 'ministers' became known as imams. Wallace rejected black nationalism in favor of Islamic anti-racism and disbanded the militaristic "Fruit of Islam" group.

In a 2000s interview alongside Louis Farrakhan, Warith Deen Muhammad described breaking with his father Elijah Muhammad over the issue of Fard's divinity:

I differed with my father, and I didn't want to differ with him. In fact I never differed with him directly, he was told that someone heard me saying something different. So he called me to question me about it.

And I told him that I could more readily believe he was God, than I could believe that his teacher was God. Because his teacher was a white man and he said white people were devils.

My mother, when I was leaving the home one day, after my father had insisted that I accept God the way he presented God, or I was gonna be cut off from all communication, he told me he knew it would hurt me to know that I wouldn't be able to see my mother. He said - "you won't be able to talk to your mother or see her". So... I didn't change, and as I was leaving my mother was hurt, and it hurt me to see her hurting like that.

She said, she walked me to the door, which she didn't do, that wasn't normal for her. And she stood on the porch at the door and she said - 'Wallace, why don't you go back there and accept it? Just say you believe.'

I said - 'Mama, tell me what Mr. Fard told you all. Did he tell you he was God?'

And she looked like her face went blank, and looked like she didn't know what to say, and in a few seconds she said - 'No, he did not. In fact he told us to not even call him Prophet, said that was too big a title for him.'

Then I said to my mother - 'How can you ask your son now, to accept a man as God, who said Prophet was too big a title for him?'.

=== Claim that Muhammad Abdullah was Fard ===
After the death of Elijah Muhammad in 1975, his son and new Nation of Islam leader Wallace D. Muhammad suggested that his newly appointed Oakland, California, Imam Muhammad Abdullah was Fard, though Abdullah himself later retracted this claim. Scholar Fatimah Fanusie has argued that Abdullah was, in fact, Fard. Abdullah was reportedly introduced as Fard to boxing legend Muhammad Ali.

Mainstream scholars reject the claim, noting that, according to Nation of Islam teachings, Fard would have been 97 years old in 1975. Morrow quotes Abdullah as denying that he was Fard, saying "It is all right to say I am Fard Muhammad for Wallace D. Muhammad. I taught him some lessons. But I am not the same person who taught Elijah Muhammad and I am not God." and "Elijah Muhammad was a sincere and good Muslim, so he created the story of W.D. Fard to attract the western mind to Islam. It's the nature of a movement to add to the magnitude of a figure. However, Fard was a real person [who was] actually incarcerated. He came from the Middle East knowledgeable in multiple languages. He was light-complexioned." Writes Morrow: "Muhammad 'Abdullah's position was unambiguous: W.D. Fard was a fabrication of Elijah Muhammad: a myth based on a real man of Middle Eastern origin."

=== Restoration under Louis Farrakhan ===
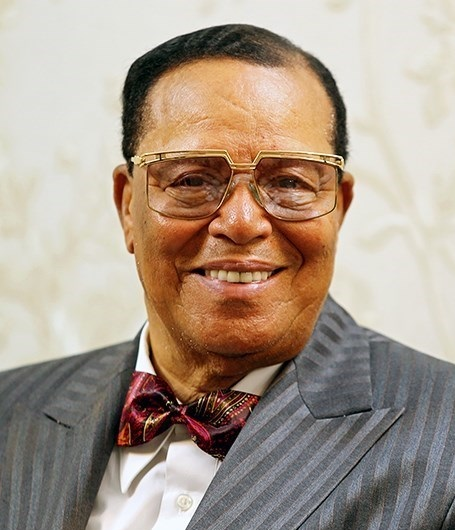
Louis Farrakhan in 2018

In 1978, Louis Farrakhan and a small number of supporters decided to rebuild what they considered the original Nation of Islam upon the foundations established by Wallace Fard Muhammad and Elijah Muhammad.

In 1979, Farrakhan's group founded a weekly newspaper entitled The Final Call, which was intended to be similar to the original Muhammad Speaks newspaper that Malcolm X claimed to have started. Farrakhan had a weekly column in The Final Call. In 1981, Farrakhan and his supporters held their first Saviours' Day convention in Chicago, Illinois, and took back the name of the Nation of Islam. The event was similar to the earlier Nation's celebrations, last held in Chicago on February 26, 1975. At the convention's keynote address, Farrakhan announced his attempt to restore the Nation of Islam under Elijah Muhammad's teachings.

In a 2000s interview featuring both Louis Farrakhan and Warith Deen Muhammad, Farrakhan argued that "Master Fard Muhammad taught us to accept our own and to be ourselves. We know that he, a man born February 26, 1877, is not the originator of the Heavens and Earth... Fard Muhammad developed a methodology, strange as it seems, unorthodox as it seems, even poisonous as it may seem, yet it was a prescription that started bringing balance to the system, and that we would evolve from a Nationalist Black-thinking people into the universal message of Islam."

In 2007, the Nation of Islam had an estimated membership of 20,000–50,000.

=== In music ===
Fard and his teachings are also referenced in many hip-hop songs. Artists who have made references within their music include Jay-Z and Jay Electronica in the song "We Made It", Brand Nubian in the song "Wake Up", and Ras Kass in the song "Riiiot!" In 2020, Busta Rhymes and Rick Ross collaborated on a piece titled "Master Fard Muhammad".

== See also ==
- List of people who disappeared mysteriously: 1910–1990
- List of people who have been considered deities
