= The Mosque Cares =

US-based Islamic charity

The Mosque Cares is a non-profit Islamic da'wah project founded by Imam Warith Deen Muhammad (1933–2008), a former leader of the Nation of Islam and a son and successor to its first Supreme Minister Elijah Muhammad (1897–1975).

Imam W. D. Mohammed started The Mosque Cares in 2003 after resigning from the American Society of Muslims. The Mosque Cares is based in the Chicago metropolitan area.

Since Mohammed's death in 2008, The Mosque Cares has been led by one of his sons, Wallace D. Mohammed II. The Mosque Cares often works together with other Islamic groups in the United States, such as the Muslim Alliance in North America ("MANA") and the Islamic Society of North America ("ISNA").

The Mosque Cares is responsible for the coordination of the major events of "the community of Muslims who follow the leadership of Imam W. Deen Mohammed." These events include but are not limited to Saviours' Day, the Annual Convention, and the Ramadan Sessions.

The Mosque Cares president, Wallace Deen Mohammed II, is currently seeking control over the intellectual properties (his name, picture, quotes, writings, etc.) of his father. This matter is currently a part of the probate case between Imam W. D. Mohammed's wives (legal and non-legal wives).
