= Jabir Herbert Muhammad =

American sports executive (1929–2008)

- Born: April 16, 1929; Detroit, Michigan, U.S.
- Died: August 25, 2008 (aged 79); Chicago, Illinois, U.S.
- Occupation: Businessman
- Known for: Manager of Muhammad Ali
- Spouse: Amenah Antonia Muhammad
- Children: 14
- Father: Elijah Muhammad
- Relatives: Warith Deen Mohammed (brother); Akbar Muhammad (brother)

Jabir Herbert Muhammad (April 16, 1929 – August 25, 2008) was an American businessman and co-founder of Top Rank, Inc. He was the longtime manager of legendary boxer Muhammad Ali.

== Early life ==
Muhammad was born in Detroit, Michigan, as the third son of the Nation of Islam leader, Elijah Muhammad. He served as a chief adviser to his father until his departure in 1975. He visited Libyan leader Muammar Gaddafi in Tripoli in December 1971 on behalf of his father to raise fund for the Nation of Islam.

Muhammad also worked as the chief business manager for the Nation of Islam, and he along with Malcolm X founded their weekly newspaper. Jabir Muhammad was a staunch supporter of his brother, Imam Warith Deen Mohammed, whom he followed into mainstream Islam. He, along with Muhammad Ali and others, built Masjid Al-Fatir, a stand-alone, purpose-built Masjid on the south side of Chicago, Illinois. This was one of the first mosques built from the ground by Muslim Americans, especially African American Muslims.

== Career ==
Muhammad was the director and founder of the Muhammad Islamic Foundation, a not-for-profit foundation which published the book Prayer and Al-Islam by Imam Warith Deen Mohammed in 1984.

Muhammad managed Muhammad Ali's professional boxing career from 1966 when he took over Ali's management after the expiry of Ali's management agreement with the Louisville Sponsoring Group, until Ali's retirement in 1981. Muhammad negotiated the first multimillion-dollar earnings for any athlete, starting with the $2.5M Ali earned for the Frazier vs Ali "Fight of the Century" in March 1971 and including the $5.5M purse Ali achieved for the Foreman vs Ali "Rumble in the Jungle" in Zaire in 1974. Muhammad was considered one of the most powerful figures in boxing in the 1960s and 1970s, achieving the Boxing Hall of Fame's 1974 "Manager of the Year" award. He continued to manage Ali's career for another ten years (from 1971 to 1981) after his retirement from boxing. Muhammad then went on to a successful career in business.

Jabir Herbert Muhammad died on August 25, 2008, at the University of Illinois Medical Center in Chicago, at the age of 79, after undergoing heart surgery. He was survived by his wife, Amenah Antonia Muhammad, and fourteen children.

== Criticism ==
Muhammad has been criticized for his handling of Ali's money and for allowing him to continue boxing into "fistic old age". However many boxing experts have argued that Muhammad secured the largest fight purses in boxing, making Ali the highest paid athlete despite the criticisms. Others questioned Muhammad's actual business acumen, given Ali's financial profligacy and lack of quality income generating activity post-retirement. Ali's financial affairs improved in the 1990s after his management was taken over largely by his wife, Lonnie Ali.
