= Muhammad Farms =

Nation of Islam farm in Georgia

Muhammad Farms is an agricultural co-operative in Bronwood, Georgia, run by the Nation of Islam.

== History ==
Initially founded in the 1960s under the direction of Elijah Muhammad, as part of the NOI's economic program. The intention was to create a foundation for future African-American agriculture. However, its initial operation was a money pit and the Nation sold the land. Later, the refounded NOI under Louis Farrakhan rebought 1,600 of the 5,000 acres for its renewed farming operations in 1994.

== Activities ==
Muhammad Farms grows fruits, vegetables, legumes and grains which are then sent to major cities with an NOI presence.

== See also ==
- How to Eat to Live – diet of the NOI
