= Akbar Muhammad =

American professor of history (1939–2016)

Akbar Muhammad (July 31, 1939 – April 11, 2016) was an associate Professor Emeritus of history and Africana studies at Binghamton University in New York. He specialized in African history, West African social history, as well as the study of Islam in Africa and the Americas. He was the co-editor of Racism, Sexism, and the World-System, along with Joan Smith, Jane Collins, and Terrence K. Hopkins. His own writings focused on slavery in Muslim Africa, Muslims in the United States, and integration in Nigeria through the use of education. He held a notable role in the history of the Muslims in America.

== Early life ==
Akbar Muhammad was the youngest child of Elijah Muhammad and Clara Muhammad and the brother of Warith Deen Mohammed. He received his Doctor of Philosophy from Edinburgh University in Scotland. While completing his degree from Edinburgh, Muhammad was appointed as a founding director of Afro-American Studies at Vanderbilt University. He served on the board of trustees for the American Islamic College in Chicago. Through his years in Cairo, he became fluent in Arabic. When Akbar was in Egypt he studied at the prestigious Muslim University, Al-Azhar University. Akbar loved teaching at SUNY Binghamton University in upstate New York. Akbar was widely respected by his students at SUNY Binghamton University. Through the help of Akbar in teaching about the history of Islam, Binghamton University's Muslim Student Association became one of the strongest student organization in the SUNY college system.
