= Message to the Blackman in America =

Book published in 1965 by Nation of Islam founder Elijah Muhammad

Message to the Blackman in America is a book published by Nation of Islam leader Elijah Muhammad in 1965 and reprinted several times thereafter. Beginning with a brief autobiography of Muhammad, it covers his philosophies on race, the religion of Islam, politics, economics, and social issues, and how they relate to the problems of African-Americans. The book also covers his own ideology and how he feels that the "Blackman" can improve himself in America. The book calls for justice under the laws of America; or for America to help settle black people in a separate land of its own, "either here or elsewhere."

The book might be viewed today as a diametric response, an opposite extreme, to the experience of racism. For example, In Message to the Blackman in America (1965) Elijah Muhammad states that “The origin of sin, the origin of murder, the origin of lying are deceptions originated with the creators of evil and injustice—the white race.”

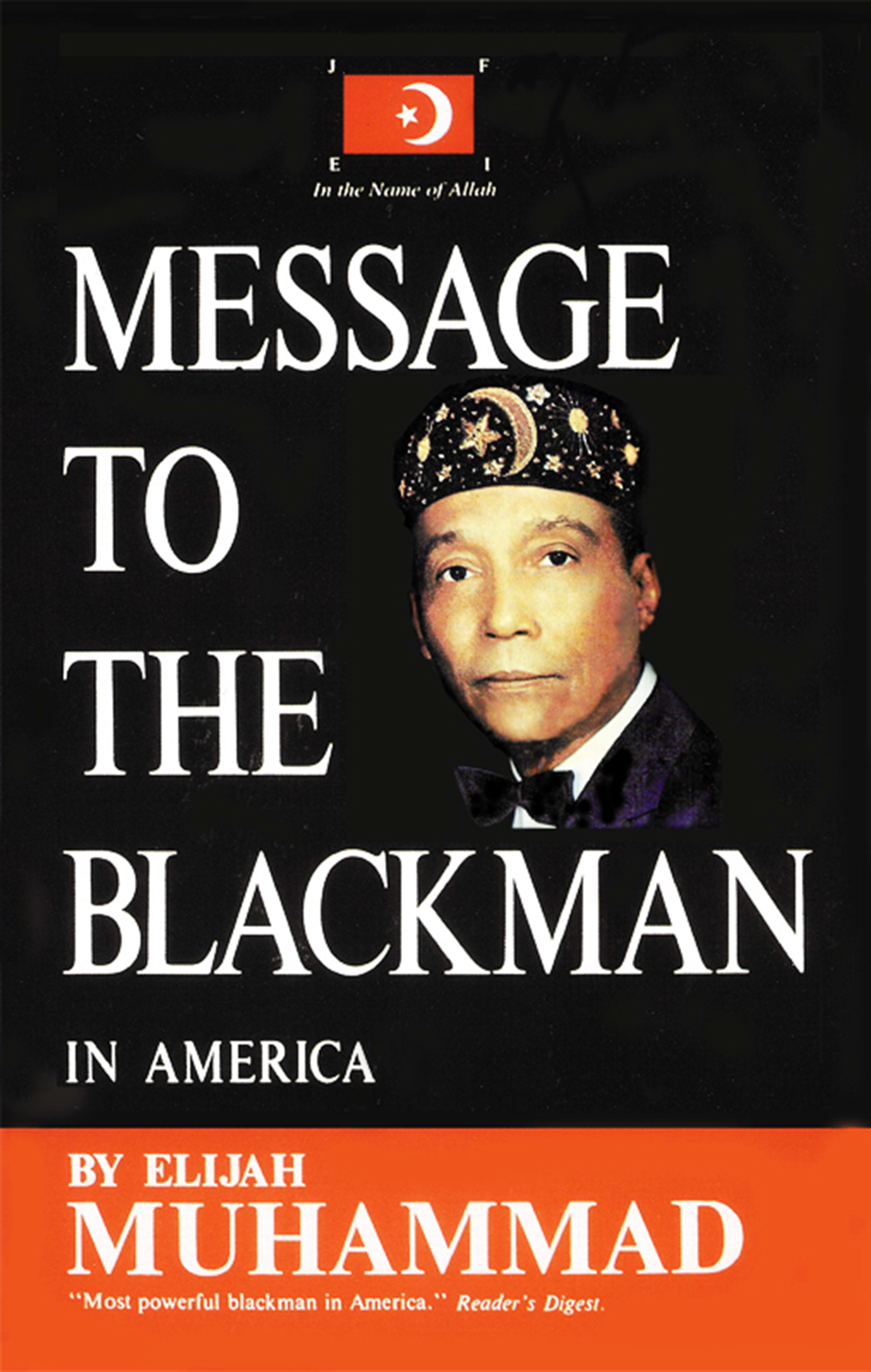
Dust jacket cover of the book

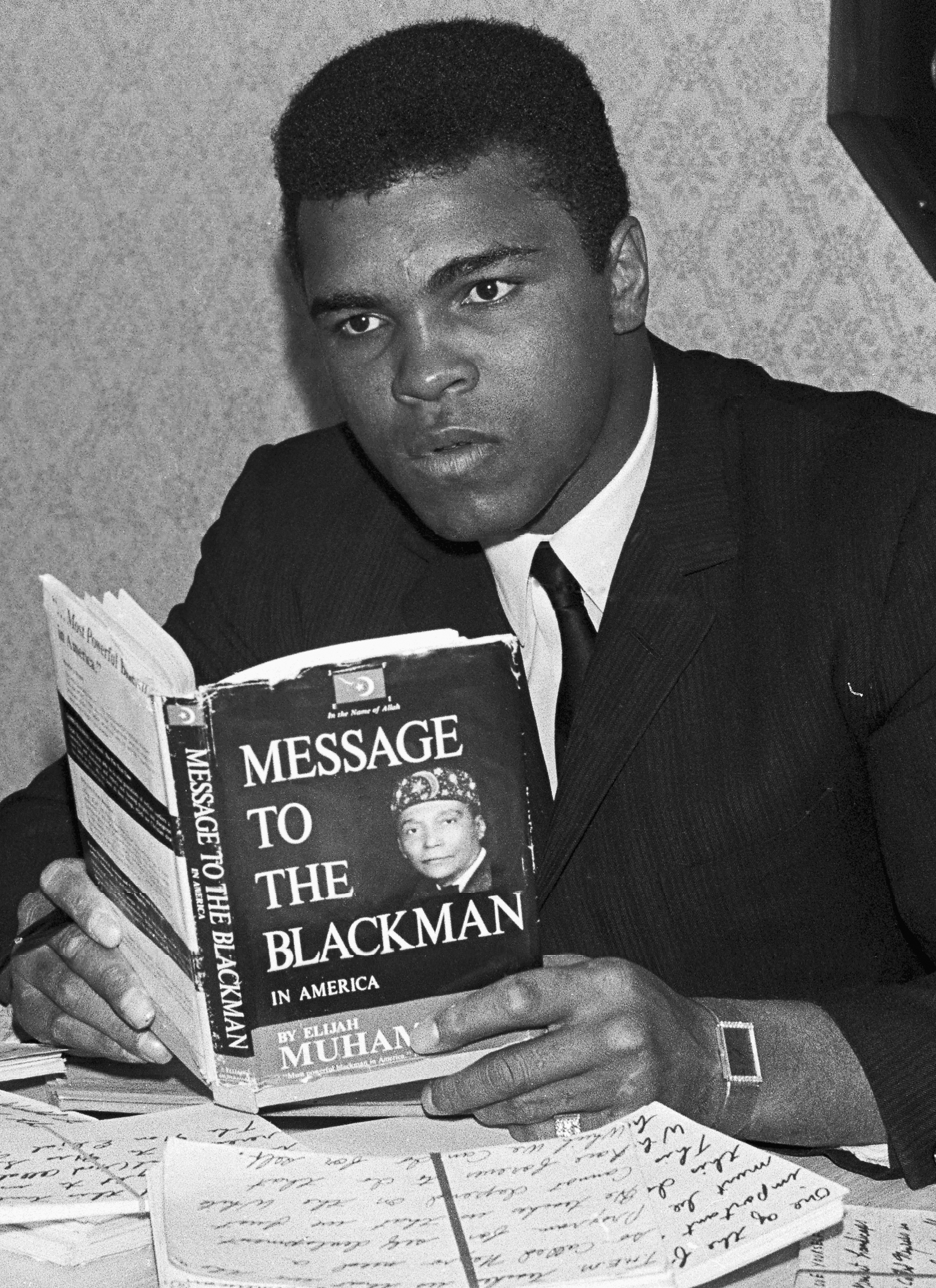
Muhammad Ali reading the book in 1968

"Message to the Blackman in America" was used as a reference by Supreme Court Justice John Harlan, and Chief Justice Warren Burger, in the overturning of the lower court conviction of Muhammad Ali for draft evasion. "Harlan’s clerks supplied him with copies of The Autobiography of Malcolm X and Elijah Muhammad’s Message to the Blackman in America. The Supreme Court struck down Ali’s conviction in 1971. Moral and ethical reasoning was a legitimate reason for the granting of conscientious objector status."
