= Mosque Maryam =

Nation of Islam (NOI) Mosque in Chicago, Illinois, U.S.

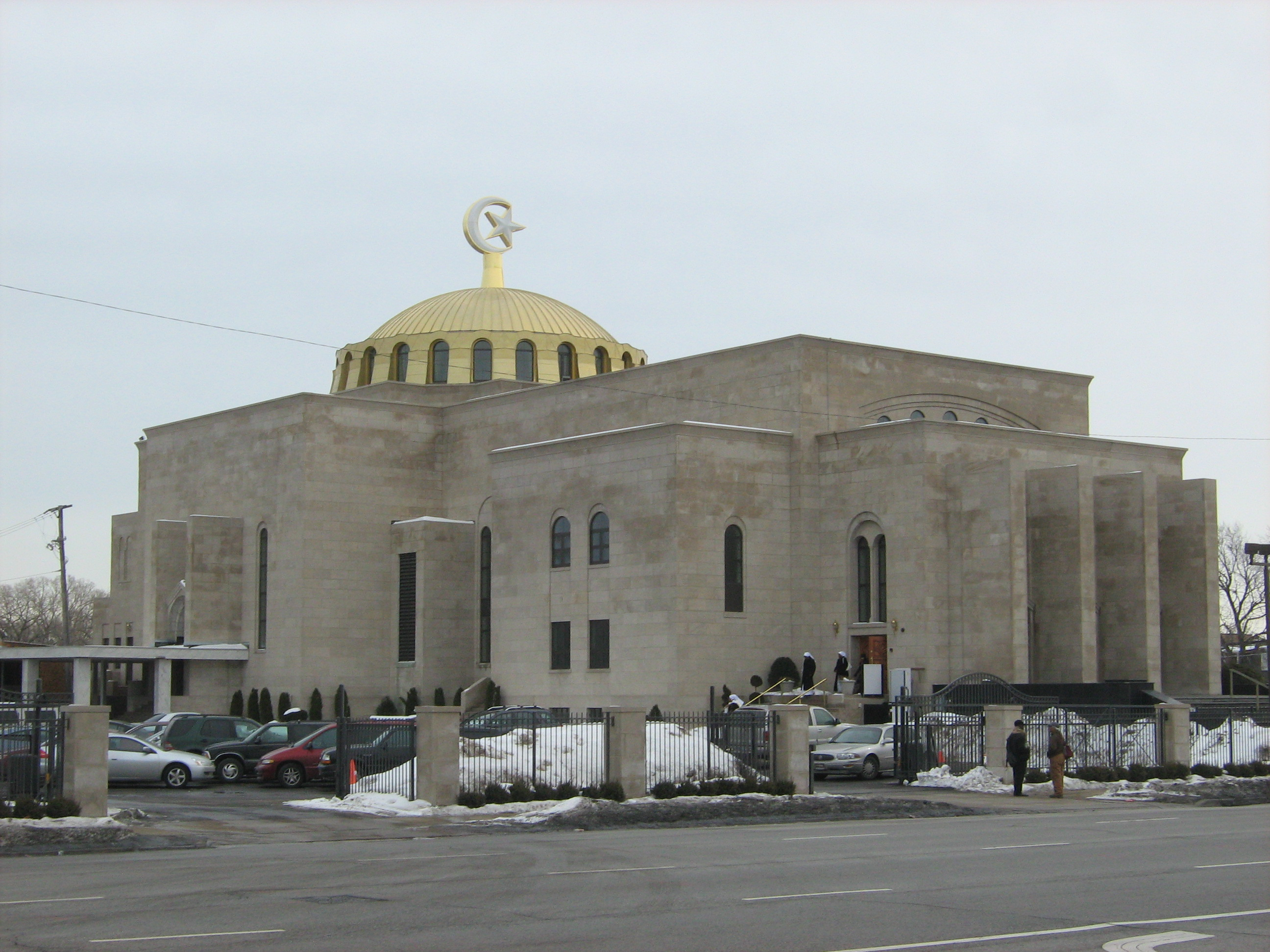
- Mosque Maryam in February 2009

Religion
- Affiliation: Nation of Islam (formerly Greek Orthodox)
- Leadership: Minister Louis Farrakhan

Location
- Location: 7351 S. Stony Island Avenue
- Municipality: Chicago
- State: Illinois
- Interactive map of Mosque Maryam
- Coordinates: 41°45′39″N 87°35′6.2″W

Specifications
- Dome: 1
- Minaret: 0

Website
- www.noi.org

Mosque Maryam, also known as Muhammad Mosque #2 or Temple #2, is the headquarters of the Nation of Islam, located in Chicago, Illinois. It is at 7351 South Stony Island Avenue in the South Shore neighborhood. The building was originally the Saints Constantine and Helen Greek Orthodox Church (Note: At the time of its sale it was North America's largest Greek Orthodox church.) before it relocated to suburban Palos Hills. Elijah Muhammad, Farrakhan's predecessor as head for NOI, purchased the building in 1972. Muhammad was lent $3 million from Libyan leader Muammar Gaddafi to convert the former church.

The main hall in the mosque is for meetings, since it was originally the church nave that contained pews later replaced with seats. Mosque Maryam has an internal open floor area for prayer rugs on which to kneel for prayer. They use that area every Friday for Jumu`ah prayer, which is led by the NOI's Imam.

Adjacent to the mosque is the Muhammad University of Islam, an educational institute for boys and girls from preschool through 12th grade.

== History ==
Farrakhan named the building Mosque Maryam in 1988. The Muhammad University of Islam was opened the same year.

== See also ==
- List of mosques in the United States
