= Warith Deen Mohammed =

American religious leader (1933–2008)

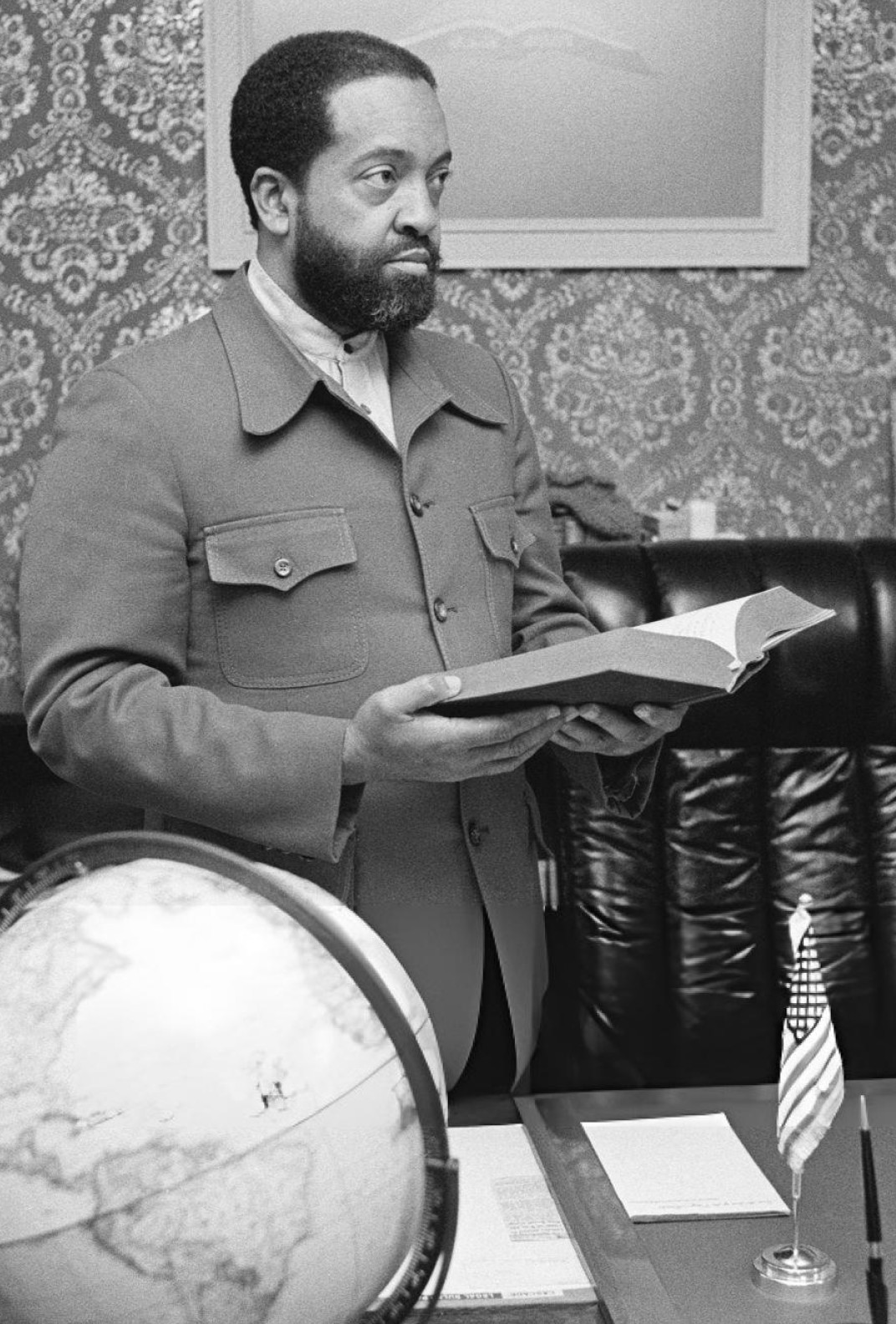
- Warith Deen Mohammed in 1977

Third leader of the Nation of Islam
- former
- Assumed office February 26, 1975
- Preceded by: Elijah Muhammad
- Succeeded by: Louis Farrakhan

Leader of the American Society of Muslims
- In office 1976 – August 31, 2003

Director of The Mosque Cares
- In office 2003 – September 9, 2008

Personal details
- Born: Wallace D. Muhammad; October 30, 1933 Hamtramck, Michigan, U.S.
- Died: September 9, 2008 (aged 74) Chicago, Illinois, U.S.
- Resting place: Mount Glenwood Cemetery, Thornton, Illinois, U.S.
- Spouses: Shirley Mohammad; Khadijah Siddeeq Binah Muhammad
- Children: 8
- Parents: Elijah Muhammad; Clara Muhammad
- Relatives: Jabir Herbert Muhammad (brother); Akbar Muhammad (brother)
- Education: Muhammad University of Islam
- Occupation: Imam, religious reformer, Muslim scholar, businessman

Warith Deen Mohammed (born Wallace D. Muhammad; (Note: In 1989, Mohammed changed the spelling of his surname Muhammad to Mohammed to reflect the spelling on his birth certificate.) October 30, 1933 – September 9, 2008) was an American religious leader, theologian, philosopher, Muslim revivalist, and Islamic thinker. He was the son of Elijah Muhammad, the leader of the Nation of Islam from 1933 to 1975. In 1975, Following his father's death, he became the Nation of Islam's leader. In 1976, he disbanded the original Nation of Islam and transformed it into an ostensibly orthodox and mainstream Islamic movement. He rejected the previous deification of Wallace Fard Muhammad, accepted whites as fellow-worshippers, forged closer ties with mainstream Muslim communities, and introduced the Five Pillars of Islam into his group's theology. This organization was called the Bilalians (1975), World Community of Al-Islam in the West (1976–77), American Muslim Mission (1978–85), and finally the American Society of Muslims.

Splinter groups which resisted these changes were formed after Elijah Muhammad's death, particularly under Louis Farrakhan, who would revive the name Nation of Islam for his organization, Final Call, in 1978. Farrakhan's NOI and the previous Final Call claim that they are direct continuations of the pre-1975 NOI.

== Early life and education ==
Mohammed was born Wallace D. Muhammad on Yemans Street in Hamtramck, Michigan, in 1933. In 1992, he changed his legal name to Warith Deen Muhammad, which translates to 'Inheritor of the Religion of Muhammad'. His parents were Clara and Elijah Muhammad, both highly active in the Nation of Islam (NOI), the organization that preached a form of Black nationalism and its own version of Islam. From 1934 until he died in 1975, Elijah Muhammad led the Nation under the title, "the Messenger of Allah."

Named to honor Wallace Fard Muhammad (Fard), the founder of the Nation of Islam, Mohammed grew up in Chicago as one of seven siblings. His elementary education came from the Muhammad University of Islam (MUI) school system (later known as the Clara Muhammad Schools, or Muhammad Schools). He briefly studied Arabic as a youth under Jamal Shakir Diab, a Palestinian who was later hired by his father to teach at the MUI in Chicago.

Mohammed became a minister under his father in late 1958 and served in Philadelphia during the late 1950s and early 1960s. While serving in Philadelphia, W.D. Mohammed commenced an extensive study of Ahmadiyya doctrines under Philadelphia-based Ahmadi missionary Muhammad Abdullah.

On October 29, 1961, Mohammed was arrested for failure to report to Elgin State Hospital. The following day, on his 28th birthday, Mohammed was transferred to Federal Correctional Institution, Sandstone, to begin a term for having refused induction into the United States military. He could have performed community service, but his father pressed him to accept the jail time. He spent most of that time studying the Quran, the main Islamic holy book, and the Bible.

He became convinced that the Nation of Islam had to change. In 1963, he was released from prison and resumed studies under Muhammad Abdullah. Close also to Malcolm X, who the NOI had expelled, he found that by this time his viewpoints deviated significantly from those of his father, whom he no longer believed to be a prophet. Because of this conclusion, he was excommunicated five different times; by 1974, he returned permanently to the NOI.

== Religious leadership and ministry ==
=== Reforming the Nation of Islam ===
Upon his father's death on February 25, 1975, Mohammed was unanimously chosen as the leader of the Nation of Islam and introduced to the NOI membership at the annual Saviours' Day convention on February 26, 1975. Among the first changes Mohammed instituted, he dropped the title Supreme Minister and took the titles Mujaddid, Chief Imam, or simply Imam, in 1976. The same year, he unveiled a new flag for the NOI community.

These were just two of the many reforms which Mohammed introduced. Among others, he eliminated the NOI dress code, disbanded the military branch of the NOI, clarified the concept of the devil, and introduced an eclectic, esoteric interpretation of Islam he labeled, The Divine Mind/Body-Christ. According to WD's former Special Aide Dr. Na'im Akbar, WD's Teachings are not restricted to WD's followers but "will provide for the social community a series of readings which will cultivate and grow them more effectively as social human beings... based on the most renowned religious teachings of a teacher in the West." Similarly, via his various written works, Muhammad Speaks newspaper, and public speeches, he gradually introduced and explained Islam's Five Pillars. He stated that Fard was not divine and that his father was not a prophet. All of the over 400 temples were converted into traditional Islamic mosques. He also renamed the community several times before finally settling on the American Society of Muslims to reflect the new thinking. Mohammed was frank about his intentions to evolve the movement. On November 19, 1978, he spoke on the "Evolution of the Nation of Islam" at the American Academy of Religion in New Orleans.

Mohammed's changes reached deep into the philosophy of the movement which his father had led for so long. He rejected literal interpretations of divine scriptures, his father's theology, and Black-separatist views, and based on his intensive independent study, history, and theology, he accepted whites as fellow worshipers. However, he also encouraged African Americans (Bilalians) to separate themselves from their pasts, in 1976 calling upon them to change their surnames which were often given to their ancestors by slave masters. He forged closer ties with mainstream Muslim communities, including Latino Muslims. He also decentralized power. On September 10, 1978, in an address in Atlanta he resigned as Chief Imam and appointed a six-member council to lead the Community.

Mohammed felt quite keenly about his role in reform. In an interview which was published in the Muhammad Speaks newspaper and conducted by his brother Jabir Herbert Muhammad, Mohammed described his role as the successor to their father as that of a Mujeddid, one who would watch over the new Islam or community. In 1979 he used the title Mujeddid (Mujaddid) on his byline in his weekly articles for the Bilalian News (the new title of Muhammad Speaks).

Warith Deen Mohammed received encouragement from the international Muslim community, yet the changes which he made within the Nation of Islam were not universally accepted. Several dissident groups resisted, most notably those who followed Louis Farrakhan in breaking ranks with Mohammed. These groups revived the name 'Nation of Islam' between 1977 and 1979. At the outset of the 1991 Gulf War, Warith Deen Mohammed became the only American Imam to issue a public endorsement of the US military bombing of Iraq. Two consecutive Muslim Journal issues featured the endorsement on its front page. The endorsement came on the eve of the Amiriyah shelter bombing.

The following year, in recognition of his military endorsement, the United States Congress and Pentagon honored WD Mohammed for his "loyal and unswerving religious leadership in support of our Nation during the difficult times during the Gulf War." Mohammed described the invitation "I am like floating in the air. I never dreamed that we would receive such an invitation." When questioned about his Gulf War endorsement and call for Muslims to fight Muslims generated conflicts in his community, he replied, "Yes, it is a conflict. It is a conflict of emotions and a conflict of conscience for many. But for me it is no conflict of conscience when I know that I am on the right side. Once I know that I am on the right side, I have no conflict of conscience at all. I did not rush into any decision. I thought it out very carefully…So I thank America many times. I thank you again. I thank the military. I thank the Army. I thank all of you. I told my sons I would be proud if my sons were in the military."

In 1995, Mohammed released a statement in which he expressed his concern about Farrakhan's motivations and the racial divisiveness of his ministry. Yet over the next twenty years, the pair would embrace publicly. Warith Deen Mohammed declared, "I will never denounce him as long as he says he wants to be a Muslim." They also declared reconciliation at the annual NOI Saviours' Day convention on February 25, 2000, and NOI Million Family March on October 16, 2000. Still, on August 10, 2007, Mohammed repeated his frustration with the separatist stance of the current Nation of Islam, stating that its leaders had, "for the last 10 years or more,...just been selling wolf tickets to [threatening, without substance] the white race and having fun while they collect money and have fancy lifestyles." He predicted a quiet evolution in the NOI towards unity with the mainstream American Muslim community.

=== Building ties within the Muslim community ===
Mohammed was intent on strengthening bonds between his movement and the wider American Muslim faith community as well as with followers of Islam abroad. It was his goal to align American Muslims with Sunni Islam. In 1976, he took a delegation to Guyana on an official state visit to meet with Prime Minister Forbes Burnham, and the then President of Guyana Arthur Chung, during which he forged ties with the Ahmadiyya Muslim Community in the region.

In Geneva, Switzerland in 1985, he met with Dr. Muhammad Ahmad Al-Sharif, Secretary General of the World Islamic Call Society of Libya and Dr. Abdul Hakim Tabibi, an Afghan mujahid, to discuss areas of future cooperation with the World Islamic Call Society and the Muslim Community of America. He hosted Grand Mufti Abdullah Mukhtar, the leader of an estimated 60 million Muslims at Masjid Bilal, during his first visit to the United States in 1994.

In 1999, he was elected to serve on the Islamic Society of North America's shura board. That same year, during Ramadan, he pledged to work with the Grand Mufti of Syria, Shaikh Ahmed Kuftaro an-Naqshbandi for the advancement of Al-Islam during a meeting with Kuftaro and Shaikh Nazim al-Haqqani. He was the special invited guest and keynote speaker at the "Inaugural Conference on the Growth and Development of Islam in America", held at Harvard University on March 3–4, 2000.

=== Interfaith cooperation ===
Just as Mohammed sought to be racially inclusive, he also focused on cooperation between multiple faiths. On May 23, 1976, he conducted a massive interfaith Spiritual Life Jubilee with the Peoples Temple in Los Angeles, California and headlined with Jim Jones on the subject, "A New Heaven and a New Earth". In 1977, he participated in a Muslim-Christian dialogue in Fort Worth, Texas with Dr. Jack Evans, then President of Southwestern Christian College in Terrell, Texas. In February 1978, he gave a historic address before more than 1,000 Jews and Muslims at the Washington Hebrew Congregation in Washington, D.C., then under the leadership of Rabbi Joshua O. Haberman.

This was a focus that would persist throughout his career. In 1993, he spoke at the Interfaith Roundtable National Conference of Christians, Jews and Muslims in Detroit, Michigan. "If we look at the broad definition for Muslim, we have to say that even though a Christian may be worshipping Jesus the Christ Prophet more than he is worshipping Allah, he or she may be Muslim in their spirit. They may still be Muslim, though the orientation has now dominated their Muslim urge. The person carrying a heavy cross may be a Muslim inwardly. So it is for a Jew, or Communist, or a Buddhist, or a Hindu."

In March 1995, he gave the keynote address at the Muslim-Jewish Convocation in Glencoe, Illinois. From October 1–6, 1996 he met with Pope John Paul II and Cardinal Francis Arinze at the Holy See in Rome. On August 17, 1997, he was presented the Luminosa Award for Unity from the Focolare Movement. On September 9, 1997, he addressed the Baltimore Jewish Council speaking on themes of worldwide justice and fairness.

On May 18–20, 1998, he attended the Conference on Religion and Peace which was sponsored by the Center for Christian, Jewish Understanding of Sacred Heart University in Auschwitz, Poland. In June 1998 he addressed the Muslim Friends of the Focolare conference in Rome, Italy, in October of the following year, along with a 92-member delegation, he spoke before a gathering of 100,000 people in the Vatican. Pope John Paul II and the Dalai Lama were both in attendance.

On October 29, 2001, Mohammed, Minister Louis Farrakhan, Pastor Robert H. Schuller, and members of the Parliament of the World's Religions participated in an "Evening of Religious Solidarity" at the Islamic Foundation in Villa Park, Illinois.

== Political and social activities ==
Throughout his ministry, Mohammed remained politically active, both domestically and internationally. His early meetings with prominent political figures included meetings with Egyptian President Anwar Sadat in 1975, Sharjah ruler Sheik Sultan bin Muhammad Al-Qasimi in 1976, and United States President Jimmy Carter in 1977.

He was the only American who was invited and the only American to attend the 10th Annual Islamic Conference of Ministers in May, 1979, in Fes, Morocco.

In April 1988, he participated as the representative of Muslim Americans in the "Political and Religious Leaders Campaign for Planetary Survivor" in Oxford Town Hall. Later that year he was among 100 leaders in religion, government, business, law and philanthropy who gathered in Williamsburg, Virginia during the Williamsburg Charter Foundations "First Liberty Summit".

In 1995, he participated in the Forbes Forum on Management in Naples, Florida. In 1996, he participated in the "National Discussion on Race & Reconciliation" sponsored by the National Press Club in Washington, D.C. In late 1997, he attended the Organisation of Islamic Cooperation (OIC) in Teheran, Iran, and he participated in The Religious Community and Moral Challenge of Poverty Round Table Discussion convened by former U. S. Senator Paul Simon in 1998 in Carbondale, Illinois.

In November 1999, he attended consecutive World Peace Conferences. The first conference, Jubilenium Interfaith Conference for World Peace, was an invitation-only event held in Tiberias, Israel. The second was the 7th World Assembly of the World Conference on Religion and Peace, held in Amman, Jordan.

He was a prominent political speaker. Mohammed gave the first invocation in the United States Senate ever by a Muslim in 1992. That same year, he became the first Muslim to deliver an address on the floor of the Georgia State Legislature. In 1993, he gave an Islamic prayer during the first Inaugural Interfaith Prayer Service of President Bill Clinton, and again in 1997 at the second Interfaith Prayer Service. In 1996, he was invited to Egypt by Egyptian President Hosni Mubarak to address the Supreme Council of Affairs in Cairo on the theme "Islam and the Future of Dialogue between Civilizations".

He sat on a number of councils and committees, both domestically and abroad. In 1986, he was selected to serve on the World Supreme Council of Masajid (mosques) as one of only three representatives of the United States. Also in 1995 he was selected as a President of the World Conference of Religions for Peace (WCRP) and addressed its governing board in Copenhagen, Denmark. In January 1997, he was appointed to President Bill Clinton's Religious Advisory Council. In 2000, he was named to the executive committee of the Religious Alliance Against Pornography (RAAP).

He made his opinions on political matters known. On July 4, 1976, he started the New World Patriotism Day celebrations which were conducted on Independence Day in major cities across America.

In 1984, Mohammed went against the mainstream African American political establishment and opposed Reverend Jesse Jackson's run for the Democratic nomination for president. In 1985, to protest the Chicago probate court handling of an American Muslim Mission case, he organized a "Walk for Justice" that drew 500,000 participants.

On December 23, 1989, he spoke at the Annual Conference of the Islamic Committee for Palestine on the plight of the Palestinians. In 1990, Mohammed supported and endorsed Neil Hartigan for Governor of Illinois. He gave his support to the peacemaking and humanitarian efforts of Bishop Samuel Ruiz.

On September 10, 1990, he participated in the international conference on the "Current Situation in the Gulf", where he made his opposition to Iraq's invasion of Kuwait a matter of public record. He stated: "We consider President George Bush to be an honorable man. We commend his actions in ordering the surgical strikes on Iraqi military installations. These efforts to avoid excessive loss of human life are appreciated."

On behalf of the Muslim American Community, he donated $85,000 to Nelson Mandela to aid his efforts to end apartheid in South Africa during a personal meeting in Oakland, California on June 30, 1990. On September 11, 2001, he denounced the terrorist attacks as un-Islamic.

== Islamic beliefs and ideology ==
=== Fiqh ===
While he emphasized unity within the Muslim community, Warith Deen Mohammed also asked the American Muslim community to establish a new school of fiqh, a code of conduct for the observance of rituals, morals and social legislation in Islam. He told Islamica magazine in 2008 that he felt that the madhhab—the schools of thought within fiqh—were geographically influenced and should be regionally developed, suggesting that "I think we are gradually getting a sense of madhabs in America, especially those like me. We are getting a sense of madhabs. And with the coming generation I think that we will be getting a much stronger sense of it. It is coming more and more." However, his call for a new madhhab came under fire from mainstream Muslims globally who questioned his motivation for desiring such an unprecedented action.

=== Imagery and color symbolism ===
Mohammed was sensitive to the potential impact of the use of images and symbols in religions. In a 1975 article, he explored this topic and in 1976, he published his first article about the subject in the Bilalian News (later the Muslim Journal). Titled "A Message of Concern", this article has run in every subsequent copy of the publication. He also spoke about the subject. For instance, during a June 17, 1977 Friday service, he taught his followers about "The meaning of colors in Scripture and the Natural Powers of Black and White", describing ancient scriptural symbolism and its effect on modern-day scriptural and religious interpretation. He also elaborated on how colors in scripture have triggered racist influences in religious societies. In 1977, he formed the Committee for the Removal of All Images that Attempt to Portray the Divine (C.R.A.I.D.).

== Personal life ==
Warith Deen Mohammed's first wife was Shirley Mohammed, with whom he had four children. By 1994, according to The Los Angeles Times, Mohammed had been married four times and had fathered eight children. Mohammed married Khadija Siddeeq in 2004. Mohammed's eldest child Laila Mohammed stated that Warith Deen practiced polygamy. However this polygamy assertion is disputed within the community.

Beyond his public role in religion and politics, Mohammed was involved in real estate, clothing imports, and skin care. During his excommunications from the Nation of Islam in his 30s, he served as a laborer.

== Death ==
Mohammed died in Chicago in early September 2008 of a likely heart attack. His body was found in his home by his assistant Rafa Muhammad on Tuesday September 9. In addition to cardiovascular disease, Mohammed suffered from diabetes.

According to the Final Call newspaper, "The Janazah prayer service was delayed for close to an hour so the huge crowd that had assembled could be organized and situated." The Chicago Tribune wrote that 8,000 Muslims attended his funeral. His funeral was held at the Islamic Foundation in Villa Park, Illinois. Imam W.D. Mohammed was buried at Mount Glenwood Memory Gardens (South) Glenwood, Cook County, Illinois.

== Honors ==
On his 44th birthday (October 30, 1977), Mohammed received the Key to the City of Detroit, Michigan from the then Mayor of Detroit Coleman Young, along with a Proclamation declaring October 30, 1977 Wallace D. Muhammad Day in Detroit.

Then Arkansas Governor Bill Clinton proclaimed March 26, 1983 "Economic Dignity Day" in the state of Arkansas. In doing so he stated the following: Whereas, through the leadership and efforts of Warith Deen Muhammad, the American Muslim Mission is on the path of economic progress and achieving growth through unity...(I) urge all citizens to engage in activities which promote economic progress.

On July 4, 1983, Muhammad shared the Reviewing Stand for the 1984 New World Patriotism Day Parade in Chicago with then State Senator, Emarald Jones, State Representative, Howard Brooks, parade grand marshal, Harold Washington the then mayor of Chicago, and many other dignitaries. Mayor Harold Washington issued a proclamation declaring July 4, 1984, as New World Patriotism Day Coalition Parade Day in Chicago.

In 1988, King Hassan II of Morocco, invited Mohammed to participate in the traditional devotions during Ramadan, stating: Through you Imam W. Deen Mohammed all the people in America are represented.

In 1992, President Hosni Mubarak of Egypt honored Warith Deen Mohammed with "The Gold Medal of Recognition" for his religious work in the United States. He received the Focolare Movement "Luminosa Award for Unity" in 1997. On May 17, 1999, he received a Certificate of Appreciation from the United States Department of State. In 2002, Ebony Magazine selected him as one of its "100 Most Influential Black Americans".

On December 9, 1994, he received the Cup of Compassion from the Hartford Seminary in Hartford, Connecticut.

On April 6, 2002, Mohammed was made a member of the Martin Luther King Jr. International Board of Preachers at Morehouse College in Atlanta, and his portrait was hung in the International Chapel there.

On Saturday, September 3, 2005, the Council on American–Islamic Relations (CAIR) presented an award to W. Deen Mohammed in recognition of his outstanding leadership role in the American Muslim community at The Mosque Cares sponsored Annual Islamic Convention.

In eulogizing Mohammed on CNN blogs, the executive director of CAIR-Chicago, Ahmed Rehab, called him "America's Imam."

== Publications ==
=== Books authored ===
- The Teachings of W. D. Muhammad, Muhammad's Mosque #2, Chicago, 1976
- The Lectures of Emam W. D. Muhammad, Muhammad's Mosque #2, Chicago, 1976
- Book of Muslim Names, The Honorable Elijah Muhammad Mosque #2, Chicago, February 1976
- The Man and the Woman in Islam, The Honorable Elijah Muhammad Mosque #2, Chicago, February 1976
- As the Light Shineth from the East, W.D.M. Publications, Chicago, 1980
- Prayer and Al-Islam, Muhammad Islamic Foundation, Chicago, 1982, Library of Congress Card Number: 82-61077
- Religion on the Line, W.D.M. Publications, Chicago, 1983
- Imam W. Deen Muhammad speaks from Harlem, N.Y. Book 1, W. D. M. Publications, 1984
- Imam W. Deen Muhammad speaks from Harlem, N.Y.: Challenges That Face Man Today Book 2, 1985
- Meeting The Challenge: Halal Foods for Our Everyday Needs, The Honorable Elijah Muhammad Masjid, Chicago, 1986
- An African American Genesis, M.A.C.A. Publication Fund, Chicago, Illinois, 1986, Library of Congress Card Number: 86-63266
- Focus on Al-Islam: Interviews with Imam W. Deen Mohammed, Zakat Publications, Chicago, Dec. 1988, Library of Congress Card Number: 89-090728
- Al-Islam: Unity, and Leadership, The Sense Maker, Chicago, 1991, Library of Congress Card Number: 91-061449, ISBN 1-879698-00-5
- Worst Oppression Is False Worship "The Key Is Tauheed-Oneness of Allah," W.D.M. Publications, Chicago, 1991
- Growth for a Model Community in America, W.D.M. Publications, Chicago, 1995
- Islam's Climate for Business Success, The Sense Maker, Chicago, 1995, Library of Congress Card Number: 95-071105, ISBN 1-879698-01-3
- Mohammed Speaks, W.D.M. Publications, Chicago, 1999
- Blessed Ramadan – The Fast of Ramadan
- Plans for a Better Future: Peace, Inclusion and International Brotherhood
- The Schemes Of Satan the Enemy of Man
- The Champion We Have In Common: The Dynamic African American Soul Books 1, 2, 3, & 4, The Mosque Cares Publications, August 2005
- A Time for Greater Communities Volumes 1–4
- Securing our Share of Freedom
- Prayer in al-Islam, A Learner's Guide w/Instructional CD, WDM Publications, Chicago, 2007
- Return to Innocence: Transitioning of the Nation of Islam, The Sense Maker, Chicago, 2007
- Life The Final Battlefield, W.D.M. Publications, Chicago, 2008

=== Pamphlets ===
- A Look At W. Deen Mohammed: Muslim American Spokesman for Human Salvation, A Ministry of W. Deen Mohammed Publication, Chicago, 1993

=== Video and audio presentations ===
- Imam W. Deen Mohammed: "Systems of Knowledge", Muslim News Magazine, recorded as a television special by MNM during the 1994 Islamic Convention in Washington, D.C. This classroom lecture was delivered in front of more than 200 Imams and scholars at the Renaissance Hotel. "Systems of Knowledge" is a classroom presentation on the essence of Quranic Arabic and its meaning to all mankind. This presentation marked the only time that Mohammed allowed cameras into one of his private Imam classes. RT: 60 minutes. 1994.
