= Clara Muhammad =

American Nation of Islam leader (1899–1972)

Clara Muhammad (born Clara Evans; also known as Clara Poole; November 2, 1899 – August 12, 1972) was born in Macon, Georgia, the daughter of Mary Lou (Thomas) and Quartus Evans. She was the wife of Nation of Islam leader Elijah Muhammad. They married in Georgia in 1917, when she was 17 and he was 20 years old, before he changed his name from Elijah Poole. Between 1917 and 1939, Elijah and Clara Muhammad had eight children: six boys and two girls, including Warith Deen Muhammad.

Known as the First Lady of the Nation of Islam, Muhammad is credited with introducing her husband to the teachings of Nation of Islam founder W.D. Fard, whom they met after leaving Cordele, Georgia. They had to relocate to Detroit because of the financial hardship caused by prejudice and low earnings. Despite moving to Detroit, Clara suffered with her marriage, since Elijah was an alcoholic and a gambling addict. This worsened the family’s financial predicament. However, their lives changed dramatically once they met W.D. Fard.

Clara Muhammad started attending W.D. Fard’s lectures, where he introduced his interpretation of Islam to African Americans during the Great Depression, attracting followers by promising a way out of racial misery and suffering. Through Clara’s interest in his lectures, she became the reason that her husband Elijah became the minister in the Allah Temple of Islam (ATOI).

Sister Clara Muhammad played a crucial role in supporting her husband's ministry. She was akin to the "preacher's wife" in Christian churches, fulfilling various duties such as playing the piano during services, teaching Sunday school, and accompanying her husband during his trips. She guided the organization during her husband's absence from 1935 to 1946 as he fled death threats from rival temple leaders and was then incarcerated for sedition during World War II.

In the NOI's earliest days she helped establish and run the University of Islam and Muslim Girls Training schools, which provided education for NOI members' children, considered one of the nation's early versions of religious homeschooling. Like Fard Muhammad, the founder of the Nation of Islam, Sister Clara understood the importance of their follower’s education as a vehicle for success in a predominantly white society. She had more schooling than her husband, Elijah Muhammad, and assisted him in his studies in order for him to better understand assigned teachings and engage in activities that required literacy skills.

Within the University of Islam, both Fard and Clara supported the idea of wanting to protect their children from the racism experienced by black students in public schools, providing high level teaching in subjects such as math, science, and English, along with teachings on proper hygiene, astrology, and health. Many parents of students within the school expressed admiration for the school because it promoted values such as companionship, brotherhood, and aversion from trouble with the law. As for the students, they too valued the school's teachings, as it provided more information on their ancestors, spiritual teachings, and social difficulties experienced by blacks in the US- all of which helped to broaden their perspectives and learn more about their place in society.

However, children's attendance at the schools was considered truancy and resulted in prosecutions and violent confrontations between Temple members and police in Detroit, Michigan and Chicago, Illinois. Sister Clara faced challenges, including legal harassment when authorities tried to force her children back into public schools. She defended her decision to educate her children at the University of Islam, even at the risk of facing legal repercussions.

== Death and legacy ==
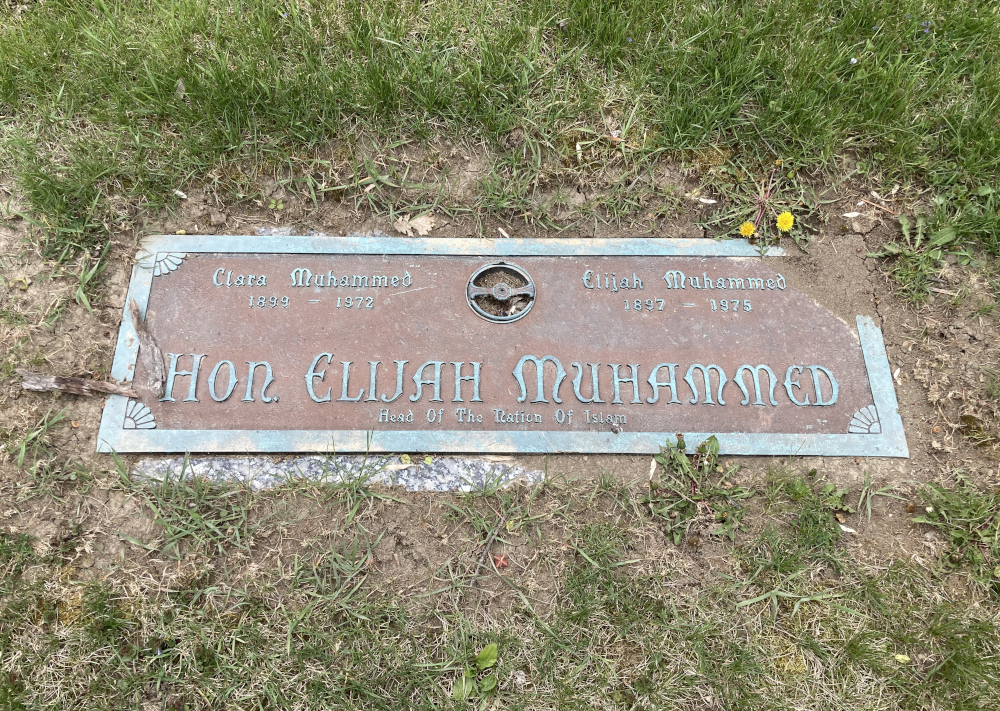
Grave at Mount Glenwood Memory Gardens South

Clara Muhammad died on August 12, 1972, after a long bout with stomach cancer. She was buried at Mount Glenwood Memory Gardens South in Glenwood, Illinois.

Her son, Warith Deen Mohammed, who assumed leadership of the Nation of Islam in 1975, renamed the University of Islam schools the Sister Clara Muhammad Schools in her honor. There are now roughly 75 Clara Muhammad Schools across the country, including the Sister Clara Muhammad School in Boston, Massachusetts and in Atlanta, Georgia.
