= Muhammad University of Islam =

Nation of Islam (NOI)-affiliated school

Coordinates: 41°45′39.9″N 87°35′3.9″W

Location
- 7351 South Stony Island Avenue; Chicago, Illinois; U.S.

Information
- Type: Private
- Religious affiliation: Nation of Islam
- Established: 1989
- Grades: K-12
- Campus: Urban
- Website: www.muichicago.org

Muhammad University of Islam (MUI) is a Nation of Islam (NOI)–affiliated K–12 school in the South Shore area of Chicago, Illinois, United States, located next to Mosque Maryam. Every major NOI mosque has a MUI. The schools are headed by the Nation of Islam's Ministry of Education, led by Dr. Larry Muhammad. Established in 1930, MUI is the first Islamic Black school system in America.

== History ==
The University of Islam was established by Elijah Muhammad. The school was greatly supported by Clara Muhammad, the wife of Elijah Muhammad and other Mothers of the Nation of Islam, in 1934 in Detroit, Michigan and was one of the original institutions of the organization. It was an elementary school that taught "mathematics, astronomy and the general knowledge of civilization." Schools were established in many of the cities where the Nation of Islam had a presence. By 1974 there were 47 University of Islam schools across the country.

Some scholars have called the University of Islam schools the nation's first attempts at homeschooling by black families.

After his father's death in 1975, Warith Deen Muhammad transformed the Muhammad University of Islam into the Clara Muhammad Schools (or simply Muhammad Schools) replacing the University of Islam founded by his father. The school system is "an association of approximately 75 elementary, secondary, and high schools throughout the United States and the Caribbean Islands." The schools have been described by Zakiyyah Muhammad of the American Educational Research Association as "models of Islamic education that are achieving commendable results".

When Minister Louis Farrakhan re-established the Nation of Islam, he also re-established the organization's schools University of Islam.
