= How to Eat to Live =

Books published by Elijah Muhammad

How To Eat To Live is a series of two books published by the Nation of Islam and written by its leader Elijah Muhammad in the 1960s. (ISBN 978-1884855160) The books cover his beliefs on healthy eating and the prescribed diet of members of the Nation of Islam at that time.

As is typical for all Muslims, Elijah Muhammad forbade eating pork. He also wrote that it is sinful to watch pigs being slaughtered, or to watch or smell the aroma of pork being cooked.

He was a strong advocate for eating only one meal a day, or eating every other day. He wrote that "If we could eat one meal a week, we could live as long as Methuselah." He opposed eating any fish weighing more than 50 pounds, opposing the consumption of tuna, halibut, carp and catfish. He supported consumption of buffalo fish, and various bass, trout and perch. Elijah Muhammad was very selective about beans, rejecting fava beans which he called "horse beans" and lima beans and other large beans. On the other hand, he praised consumption of smaller navy beans. He advocated for eating baked foods instead of fried foods, and advocated for eating cream cheese instead of aged cheeses. He did not believe that breads and cakes should be eaten directly from the oven, and supported waiting a day or two before consuming them, and for baking bread twice. He was opposed to eating food from metal cans, but supported eating canned foods from glass jars, and encouraged his followers to can seasonal foods in glass jars themselves.

According to the review that Daniel Pipes wrote of the books, Elijah Muhammed was opposed to eating "sweet potatoes, white potatoes, rice, pasta, grits, and full-grown corn and popcorn". He also opposed eating "all peas but sweet peas, no to collard greens, cabbage sprouts, turnip salad, raw vegetables, leafy legumes, large beans, and soy beans" claiming that a " meal made of nuts reduces life by five years". He believed that corn bread should not be eaten.

Among the foods that Elijah Muhammed recommended were "brown rice, smoked turkey, tahini, and tofu".

An indirect legacy of these books is the Black Muslim bean pie which has become "one of the most enduring symbols of revolutionary black power that dates back from the civil rights movement".
