= Elijah Muhammad =

African American religious leader (1897–1975)

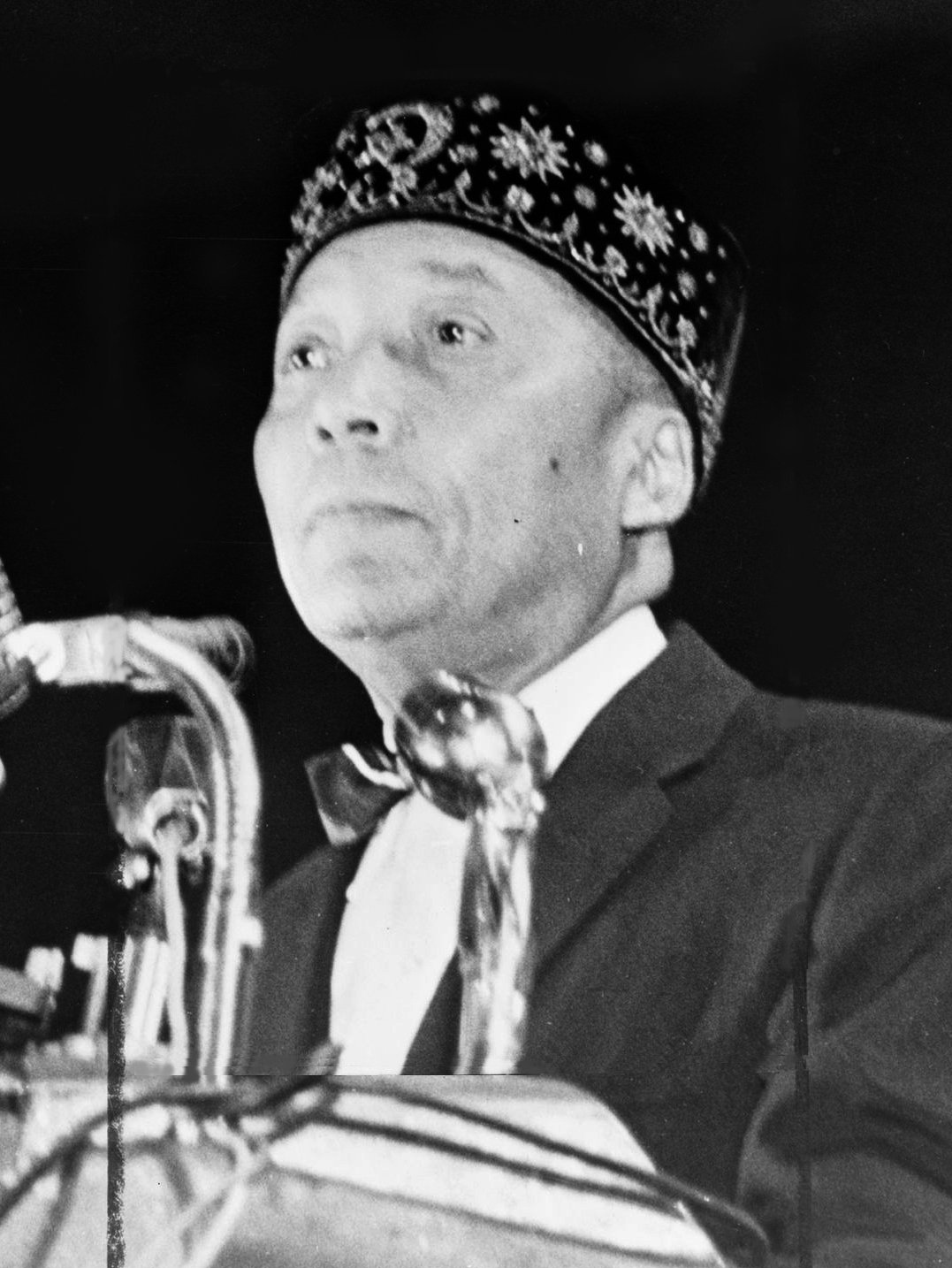
- Elijah Muhammad in 1964

Second leader of the Nation of Islam
- In office 1933 – February 25, 1975
- Preceded by: Wallace Fard Muhammad
- Succeeded by: Warith Deen Mohammed

Personal details
- Born: Elijah Robert Poole; October 7, 1897 Sandersville, Georgia, U.S.
- Died: February 25, 1975 (aged 77) Chicago, Illinois, U.S.
- Spouse: Clara Muhammad (m. 1917; died 1972)
- Children: at least 23 (8 with his wife, 15 with other women), including Jabir, Warith, and Akbar
- Occupation: Leader of the Nation of Islam

Elijah Muhammad (born Elijah Robert Poole, later Elijah Karriem; October 7, 1897– February 25, 1975) was an American religious leader who led the Nation of Islam from 1933 until his death in 1975. Under his leadership, the Nation of Islam grew from a small Detroit-based movement into a nationwide organization with tens of thousands of members in the United States during the civil rights movement. He promoted black nationalism and a distinctive theology which taught that white people were a race of "devils" created by an evil black meccan scientist named Yakub, and that there were multiple gods, each a black man named Allah whom he was the messenger of.

In the 1930s, Muhammad formally established the Nation of Islam, a religious movement that originated under the leadership and teachings of Wallace Fard Muhammad and that promoted black power, pride, economic empowerment, and racial separation. Muhammad taught that Fard Muhammad is the 'Son of Man' of the Bible, and after Fard's disappearance in 1934, Muhammad assumed control over Fard's former ministry, formally changing its name to the "Nation of Islam".

Muhammad's views on race and his call for black people having an independent nation for themselves made him a controversial figure, both within and outside the Nation of Islam. He has been variously described as a black nationalist and a black supremacist.

Muhammad died on February 25, 1975, after a period of declining health. He was succeeded as head of the Nation of Islam by his son, Wallace Muhammad (later known as Warith Deen Mohammed) who disbanded the Nation of Islam and transformed it into an ostensibly orthodox and mainstream Islamic movement, before the Nation was revived by Louis Farrakhan.

== Early years and life before Nation of Islam ==
Elijah Muhammad was born Elijah Robert Poole in Sandersville, Georgia, on October 7, 1897, the seventh of thirteen children of William Poole Sr. (1868–1942), a Baptist lay preacher and sharecropper, and Mariah Hall (1873–1958), a homemaker and sharecropper.

Elijah's education ended at the fourth grade, after which he went to work in sawmills and brickyards. To support the family, he worked with his parents as a sharecropper. When he was 16 years old, he left home and began working in factories and at other businesses.

Elijah married Clara Evans (1899–1972) on March 7, 1917. In 1923, the Poole family was among hundreds of thousands of black families forming the First Great Migration leaving the oppressive and economically troubled South in search of safety and employment. Elijah later recounted that before the age of 20, he had witnessed the lynchings of three black men by white people. He said, "I seen enough of the white man's brutality to last me 26,000 years".

Moving his own family, parents, and siblings, Elijah and the Pooles settled in the industrial north of Hamtramck, Michigan. Through the 1920s and 1930s, he struggled to find and keep work as the economy suffered during the post World War I and Great Depression eras. During their years in Detroit, Elijah and Clara had eight children, six boys and two girls.

== Conversion and rise to leadership ==
While he was in Detroit, Poole began taking part in various black nationalist movements within the city. In August 1931, at the urging of his wife, Elijah Poole attended a speech on Islam and black empowerment by Wallace Fard Muhammad (Wallace D. Fard). Afterward, Poole said he approached Fard and asked if he was the "Mahdi" (redeemer), Fard responded that he was, but that his time had not yet come. Fard taught that black people, as original Asiatics, had a rich cultural history which was stolen from them in their enslavement. Fard stated that African Americans could regain their freedom through self-independence and cultivation of their own culture and civilization.

Poole, having strong consciousness of both race and class issues as a result of his struggles in the South, quickly fell in step with Fard's ideology. Poole soon became an ardent follower of Fard and joined his movement, as did his wife and several brothers. Soon afterward, Poole was given a Muslim surname, first "Karriem", and later, at Fard's behest, "Muhammad". He assumed leadership of the Nation's Temple No. 2 in Chicago. His younger brother Kalot Muhammad became the leader of the movement's self-defense arm, the Fruit of Islam.

Fard turned over leadership of the growing Detroit group to Elijah Muhammad, and the Allah Temple of Islam changed its name to the Nation of Islam. Muhammad and Wallace Fard continued to communicate until 1934, when Wallace Fard disappeared. Muhammad succeeded him in Detroit and was named "Minister of Islam". After the disappearance, Muhammad told followers that Allah had come as Wallace Fard, in the flesh, to share his teachings that are a salvation for his followers.

In 1934, the Nation of Islam published its first newspaper, Muhammad Speaks, to educate and build membership. Children of its members attended classes at the newly created Muhammad University of Islam, but this soon led to challenges by boards of education in Detroit and Chicago, which considered the children truants from the public school system. The controversy led to the jailing of several University of Islam board members and Muhammad in 1934 and to violent confrontations with police. Elijah was put on probation, but the university remained open.

== Leadership of the Nation of Islam ==
Elijah Muhammad took control of Temple No. 1, but only after battles with other potential leaders, including his brother. In 1935, as these battles became increasingly fierce, Elijah left Detroit and settled his family in Chicago. Still facing death threats, Elijah left his family there and traveled to Milwaukee, Wisconsin, where he founded Temple No. 3, and eventually to Washington, D.C., where he founded Temple No. 4. He spent much of his time reading 104 books suggested by Wallace Fard at the Library of Congress.

On May 8, 1942, Muhammad was arrested for failure to register for the draft during World War II. After he was released on bail, Muhammad fled Washington, D.C., on the advice of his attorney, who feared a lynching, and returned to Chicago after a seven-year absence. Muhammad was arrested there, charged with eight counts of sedition for instructing his followers to not register for the draft or serve in the armed forces. Acquitted of sedition, but found guilty of draft evasion, Muhammad served four years in prison, from 1942 to 1946, at the Federal Correctional Institution in Milan, Michigan. During that time, his wife, Clara, and trusted aides ran the organization; Muhammad transmitted his messages and directives to followers in letters.

Following his return to Chicago, Elijah Muhammad was firmly in charge of the Nation of Islam. While Muhammad was in prison, the growth of the Nation of Islam had stagnated, with fewer than 400 members remaining by the time of his release in 1946. However, through the conversion of his fellow inmates as well as renewed efforts outside prison, he was able to redouble his efforts and continue growing the Nation.

Muhammad preached his own version of Islam to his followers in the Nation. According to him, blacks were known as the "original" human beings, with "evil" whites being an offshoot race that would go on to oppress black people for 6,000 years. The origins of the white race would come to be known as Yacub's History within Muhammad's teachings. In The Autobiography of Malcolm X, Malcolm X talks about when he first encounters this doctrine, though he would later come to regret that he ever believed in it.

Some scholars and commentators have noted parallels between certain teachings, symbolism, and rhetorical themes within the Nation of Islam and elements associated with Freemasonry and other esoteric traditions. Elijah Muhammad demonstrated sustained interest in the subject through his publication The Secrets of Freemasonry, which discussed Masonic symbolism, history, and religious themes. Academic studies of the Nation of Islam have also identified influences from broader currents of esotericism, Black nationalist religious thought, and symbolic initiation traditions, while generally distinguishing such intellectual or symbolic influence from evidence of formal Masonic membership by Elijah Muhammad himself.

He preached that the Nation of Islam's goal was to return the stolen hegemony of the inferior whites back to blacks across America. Much of Muhammad's teachings appealed to young, economically disadvantaged, African-American males from Christian backgrounds. Traditionally, black males would not go to church because the church did not address their needs. Muhammad's program for economic development played a large part in the growth in the Nation of Islam. He purchased land and businesses to provide housing and employment for young black males.

By the 1970s, the Nation of Islam owned bakeries, barber shops, coffee shops, grocery stores, laundromats, night-clubs, a printing plant, retail stores, numerous real estate holdings, and a fleet of tractor trailers, plus farmland in Michigan, Alabama, and Georgia. In 1972 the Nation of Islam took controlling interest in a bank, the Guaranty Bank and Trust Co. Nation of Islam-owned schools expanded until, by 1974, the group had established schools in 47 cities throughout the United States. In 1972, Muhammad told followers that the Nation of Islam had a net worth of $75 million.

== Dietary advice ==
Muhammad authored a two volume How to Eat to Live which promoted pseudoscientific views about diet and nutrition. Muhammad argued that only one meal should be eaten a day at the most and if black people eat only one meal every three days they will never get sick and may possibly live for 1000 years. He argued that eating pork will bring about depraved behaviour and culture of White westerners. According to Muhammad, beef, lamb, and camel were permissible but should be avoided if possible. He stated that "Allah forbids us to eat the flesh of swine or of fish weighing 50 pounds or more".

In regard to fowl, only baby pigeons were seen as clean and if eaten should be taken straight from the nest. According to Muhammad, peas and sweet potatoes are forbidden by Allah and many foods white in colour are automatically bad for health. Muhammad argued that white people were attempting to destroy black people by weakening their health with inappropriate processed foods such as biscuits and white bread. Muhammad considered most fruits and vegetables safe to eat "except collard greens and turnip salad". In regard to beans, only navy beans could be eaten. Lima beans were considered a poison which Muhammad believed made black men's stomachs explode. Rice and spinach were allowed in moderation. There were no restrictions on garlic, onions or whole wheat bread.

Muhammad stated that he obtained his dietary advice from "God in Person Master Fard Muhammad".

== Written works ==
- Muslim Daily Prayers (1957)
- The Supreme Wisdom, Vol. I & II (1957)
- Message to the Blackman in America (1965)
- How to Eat to Live, Vol. I (1967)
- How to Eat to Live, Vol. II (1972)
- The Fall of America (1973)
- Our Saviour Has Arrived (1974)
- The Flag of Islam (1974)

== Death ==
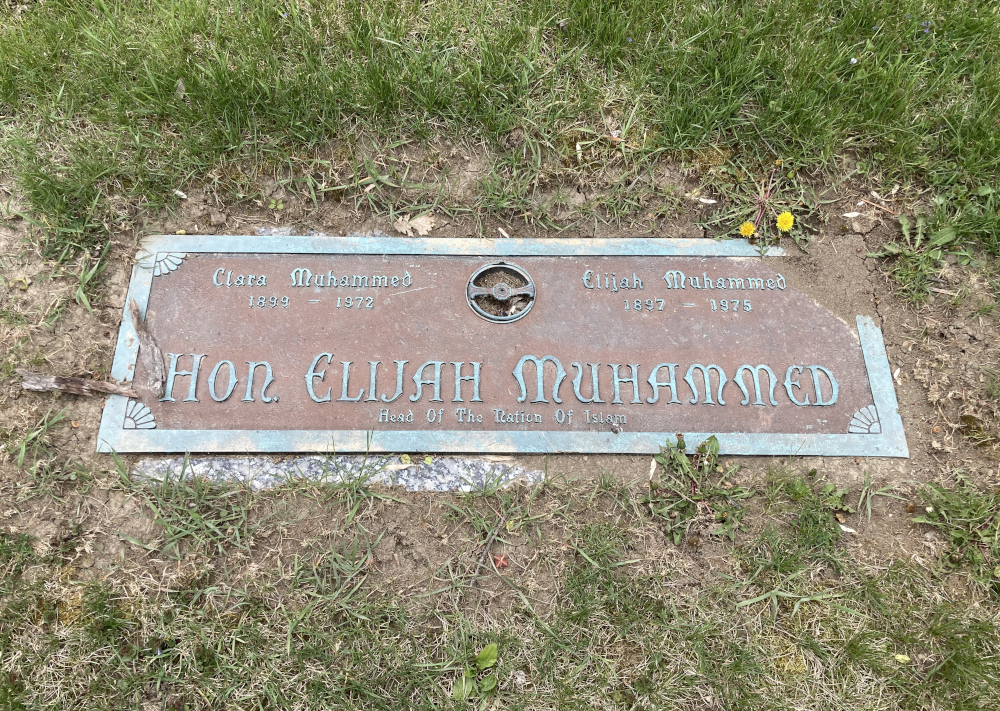
Grave at Mount Glenwood Memory Gardens South

On January 30, 1975, Muhammad entered Mercy Hospital, known as Insight Chicago in Chicago, Illinois, suffering from a combination of heart disease, diabetes, bronchitis, and asthma. There, he died of congestive heart failure nearly one month later at the age of 77 on February 25, the day before Saviours' Day. He was survived by many children, including his two daughters and six sons by his wife. Most notably, he was survived by the future Muslim leader Warith Deen Muhammad.

He was buried alongside Clara at Mount Glenwood Memory Gardens South in Glenwood, Illinois.

== Legacy ==
During his time as leader of the Nation of Islam, Muhammad had developed the Nation of Islam from a small movement in Detroit to an empire consisting of banks, schools, restaurants, and stores across 46 cities in America. The Nation also owned over 15,000 acres of farmland, their own truck- and air- transport systems, as well as a publishing company that printed the country's largest black newspaper. As a leader, Muhammad served as a mentor to many notable members, including Malcolm X, Muhammad Ali, Louis Farrakhan and his son Warith Deen Mohammed. The Nation of Islam is estimated to have between 20,000 and 50,000 members, and 130 mosques offering numerous social programs.

Upon his death, his son Warith Deen Mohammed succeeded him. Warith disbanded the Nation of Islam in 1976 and founded an orthodox mainstream Islamic organization, that came to be known as the American Society of Muslims. The organization would dissolve, change names and reorganize many times.

In 1977, Louis Farrakhan resigned from Warith Deen's reformed organization and reinstituted the original Nation of Islam upon the foundation established by Wallace Fard Muhammad and Elijah Muhammad. Farrakhan regained many of the Nation of Islam's original properties including the National Headquarters Mosque #2 (Mosque Maryam) and Muhammad University of Islam in Chicago.

== Controversies ==
=== Rift with Ernest 2X McGee ===
Ernest 2X McGee was the first national secretary of the NOI and had been ousted in the late 1950s. McGee went on to form a Sunni Muslim sect and changed his name to Hamaas Abdul Khaalis. Khaalis attracted Lew Alcindor, whom Khaalis renamed Kareem Abdul-Jabbar. Jabbar donated a house for use as the Hanafi Madh-Hab Center. Khaalis sent letters that were critical of Muhammad and Fard to Muhammad, his ministers, and the media.

The letters stated blacks had been better off "from a psychological point of view" before Fard came along because it weaned them from Christianity to a fabricated form of Islam. Both, in his opinion, were bad. His letters also revealed what he knew of Fard, alleging he was John Walker of Gary who had come to America at 27 from Greece, had served prison time for stealing, and raping a 17-year-old girl, and had died in Chicago, Illinois, at 78.

After the letters were sent, seven of Khaalis' family members were murdered at the Hanafi Madh-Hab Center. Four men from NOI Mosque No. 12 were accused of the crime.

=== Rift with Malcolm X ===
==== Malcolm X's public response to the assassination of President Kennedy ====
On December 1, 1963, when asked for a comment about the assassination of President John F. Kennedy, Malcolm X said that it was a case of "chickens coming home to roost". He added that "chickens coming home to roost never did make me sad; they've always made me glad." The New York Times wrote, "in further criticism of Mr. Kennedy, the Muslim leader cited the murders of Patrice Lumumba, Congo leader, of Medgar Evers, civil rights leader, and of the Negro girls bombed earlier this year in a Birmingham, Alabama, church. These, he said, were instances of other 'chickens coming home to roost'." The remarks prompted a widespread public outcry. The Nation of Islam, which had sent a message of condolence to the Kennedy family and ordered its ministers not to comment on the assassination, publicly censured their former shining star. Malcolm X retained his post and rank as minister, but was prohibited from public speaking for 90 days.

==== Rape of underage girls ====
Rumors were circulating that Elijah was conducting extramarital affairs with young Nation secretaries‍—‌which would constitute a serious violation of Nation teachings. After first discounting the rumors, Malcolm X came to believe them after he spoke with Muhammad's son Wallace and with the girls making the accusations. Muhammad confirmed the rumors in 1963, attempting to justify his behavior by referring to precedents set by Biblical prophets. Over a series of national TV interviews between 1964 and 1965, Malcolm X provided testimony of his investigation, corroboration, and confirmation by Muhammad himself of multiple instances of child rape. During this investigation, Malcolm X learned that seven of the eight girls had become pregnant by Muhammad, and publicly shared the information.

Malcolm X also spoke of an attempt made to assassinate him, by means of an explosive device discovered in his car, and of death threats he was receiving, which he believed were in response to his exposure of Muhammad. Years later in a series of lectures titled "Malcolm X and Elijah Muhammad 28 years later" Louis Farrakhan would give a defense of Elijah Muhammad's relationships by referring to Biblical and Quranic precedents. Farrakhan further states that one of the women whom Elijah Muhammad eventually had a child with, Evelyn, was someone who Malcolm had fallen in love with before his relationship with Betty Shabazz, leading to a greater sense of hurt and betrayal when he found about the relationship.

==== Final schism and murder of Malcolm X ====
The extramarital affairs, the suspension, and other factors caused a rift between the two men, with Malcolm X leaving the Nation of Islam in March 1964 to form his own religious organization, Muslim Mosque Inc. After dealing with death threats and attempts on his life for a year, Malcolm X was assassinated on February 21, 1965. Many people suspected that the Nation of Islam was responsible for the killing of Malcolm X. Five days after Malcolm X was murdered, in a public speech at the Nation of Islam's annual Saviours' Day on February 26, Elijah justified the assassination by quoting that "Malcolm got just what he preached", but at the same time denied any involvement with the murder by asserting in the same speech: "We didn't want to kill Malcolm and didn't try to kill him. We know such ignorant, foolish teaching would bring him to his own end."

=== Cooperation with white supremacists ===
Some believed that Elijah's pro-separation views were compatible with those of some white supremacist organizations in the 1960s. He met with leaders of the Ku Klux Klan (KKK) in 1961 to work toward the purchase of farmland in the Deep South. For more than ten years Elijah received major financial support from white supremacist Texas oil baron H. L. Hunt due to Elijah's belief in racial separation from whites. The money helped Elijah to acquire opulent homes for himself and his family and establish overseas bank accounts. Yet, there are also those who believe that the black separatism movement to be a consequence of historic social, political and financial disenfranchisement of the blacks. Many also believed that the narrative of racial superiority as a black construct to upend the white power structure is inconsistent with history.

Muhammad eventually established Temple Farms, now Muhammad Farms, on a 5,000-acre (20 km^{2}) tract in Terrell County, Georgia. George Lincoln Rockwell, founder of the American Nazi Party, once called Elijah "the Hitler of the black man." At the 1962 Saviours' Day celebration in Chicago, Rockwell addressed Nation of Islam members. Many in the audience booed and heckled him and his men, for which Elijah rebuked them in the April 1962 issue of Muhammad Speaks.

== Personal life ==
Elijah married Clara Muhammad in Georgia in 1917, and he had eight children with her. He also fathered at least nine children from extra-marital relationships and rapes. In total, it is estimated that he had 23 children, of whom 21 are documented.

After Elijah's death, nineteen of his children filed lawsuits against the Nation of Islam's successor, the World Community of Islam, seeking status as his heirs. Ultimately, the court ruled against them.

Children via his wife, Clara Muhammad: Two daughters and six sons including notable:

- Jabir Herbert Muhammad (1929–2008)
- Wallace Delaney Muhammad, later known as Warith Deen Mohammed (1933–2008)
- Akbar Muhammad (1939–2016)

Children via mistresses:

- Lucille Rosary Karriem Muhammad: three daughters
- June Muhammad: one son including notable: Abdullah Muhammad and one daughter
- Evelyn Williams: one daughter
- Ola (Hughes) Muhammad: one son
- Tynnetta Muhammad: three sons and a daughter, including notable:
  - Ishmael Muhammad
- Lovetta Muhammad: one daughter
- Bernique Cushmeer: one son

== Honors ==
In 2002, scholar Molefi Kete Asante listed Elijah Muhammad on his list of 100 Greatest African Americans.

== Portrayals on screen ==
Elijah Muhammad was portrayed by Al Freeman Jr. in Spike Lee's 1992 motion picture Malcolm X. Albert Hall, who played the composite character "Baines" in Malcolm X, later played Muhammad in Michael Mann's 2001 film Ali. He was also portrayed by Clifton Davis in the series Godfather of Harlem. He was most recently portrayed by Ron Cephas Jones in the Drama Biography by National Geographic "Genius: MLK/X".

== See also ==
- African-American Muslims
- Afrocentrism
- Islam in the United States
- The Hate That Hate Produced (1959 documentary)

Preceded by Wallace D. Fard	Nation of Islam; 1934–1975	Succeeded by Warith Deen Muhammad (1975), Silis Muhammad (1977), Louis Farrakhan (1978) (split)
