= Shepherd Park =

Neighborhood of Washington, D.C.

Coordinates: 38.9844°N 77.033°W

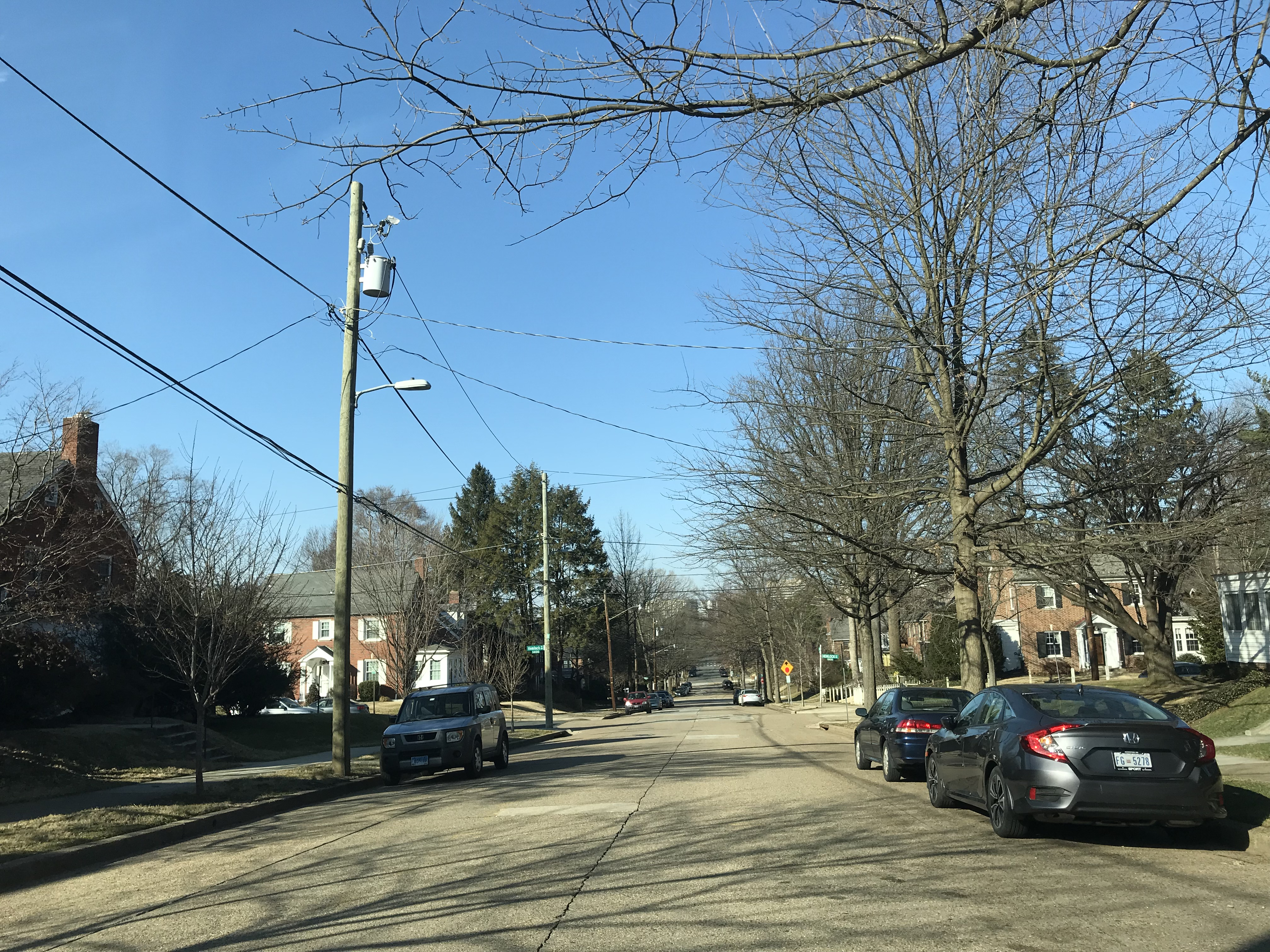
Intersection of 14th and Hemlock Streets NW in Shepherd Park, February 2018

Map of Washington, D.C., with Shepherd Park highlighted in maroon

Shepherd Park is a neighborhood in the northwest quadrant of Washington, D.C. In the years following World War II, restrictive covenants which had prevented Jews and African Americans from purchasing homes in the neighborhood were no longer enforced, and the neighborhood became largely Jewish and African American. Over the past 40 years, the Jewish population of the neighborhood has declined (though it is now increasing again) but the neighborhood has continued to support a thriving upper and middle class African American community. The Shepherd Park Citizens Association and Neighbors Inc. led efforts to stem white flight from the neighborhood in the 1960s and 1970s, and it has remained a continuously integrated neighborhood, with very active and inclusive civic groups.

Shepherd Park and the rest of Ward 4 were represented in the Council of the District of Columbia by Muriel Bowser, until her election as Mayor of the District of Columbia in the fall of 2014. It is home to a number of prominent people, including former NAACP President Benjamin Jealous. A number of judges, professors, newspaper reporters, and doctors also live in the community.

== Geography ==
The northern line of the neighborhood is defined by Eastern Avenue NW, which divides Shepherd Park from Silver Spring, Maryland. The neighborhood is further bounded at the south by Parks at Walter Reed (the former Walter Reed Army Medical Center), at the east by Georgia Avenue NW, and the west by 16th Street NW.

Most east-west streets are named after flowers, shrubs, and trees. Iris Street, Kalmia Road, and Geranium Street are but a few flower-inspired street names.

Georgia Avenue is the only commercial corridor near the neighborhood. Downtown Silver Spring and Rock Creek Park are both within walking distance. The neighborhood is served by bus services on Georgia Ave. and 16th Street, and the Silver Spring and Takoma Park Metros are equidistant, both approximately one mile away.

Local architecture includes Tudor Revival, Colonial Revival, and Spanish Colonial Revival houses; bungalows and other early-20th-century vernacular styles; and mid-century ramblers. There is a significant concentration of mail-order kit houses by the Lewis Manufacturing Company and by Sears in the southeast corner of the neighborhood.

== History ==
The neighborhood takes its name from its most famous resident: Alexander Robey Shepherd, the governor of the then-Territory of DC from 1873 to 1874. The neighborhood was originally called Sixteenth Street Heights. Part of the neighborhood was renamed Shepherd Park in 1926 when developer L.E. Breuninger proposed 200 new homes. His first model home was built in the new Shepherd Park was 7707 13th St., NW.

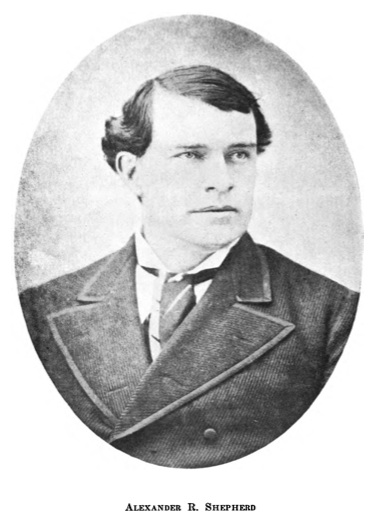
Alexander Robey Shepherd

Shortly before becoming governor (in 1868), Shepherd built a grand Second Empire-style Victorian that once stood near the corner of Floral and 14th Street. (The carriage house still stands in the alley off of Floral, entrance across from the modern house.) Shepherd chose the location because of its elevation and its proximity to Rock Creek.

Shepherd dubbed his large country home "Bleak House" after the Dickens novel Bleak House, which he and his wife were reading at the time of their home's construction. The mansion was demolished in 1916.

Shepherd owned a plant nursery in the District of Columbia, which enabled the 60,000 trees he had planted. His nursery led to a variety of wild flowers that still thrive in the yards of city residents. It is also the genesis of the streets in Shepherd Park being named for flowers.

The Shepherd Park Citizens Association formed 1917 to petition the government to build a neighborhood elementary school and pave 16th Street between Alaska Avenue and the District line.

After developers acquired the land around 1911, they designed it so that the new homes would sit on large tracts of land, and they advertised the location as a "high-class" neighborhood. The developers made sure to retain the large trees in the neighborhood when building the streets. The developers also made sure that the land was bound by covenants prohibiting its sale to blacks and Jews. The covenants stood until after World War II when the Supreme Court struck them down as unconstitutional. At that point, speculators would move a black family into a house on a block that otherwise had white residents. Speculators would then tell the white residents that property values would imminently fall and pressure the white families to sell their homes to the speculators. The speculators would then sell the homes to other black families at large profits. This was called blockbusting. Starting in 1958, the Shepherd Park Citizens Association and Neighbors Inc led efforts to fight blockbusting and maintain the integrated nature of the neighborhood in the 1960s and 1970s. It is one of the only neighborhoods on the east side of Rock Creek Park where white flight was stemmed in those years.

In 1973, 7 family members of Hamaas Abdul Khaalis family were murdered at 7700 16th Street NW, which had been purchased by Kareem Abdul-Jabbar and donated for use of the Hanafi Muslims.

In 1985, residents learned that the owner of an apartment building on Georgia Avenue was close to selling the land for a Wendy's to be built on it. Residents protested, saying that the neighborhood needed a library much more than another fast food location. The District Council decided to build a library on the site instead, and the library opened in 1990. Named the Juanita E. Thornton/Shepherd Park Library, it is named after the neighborhood activist who led the neighborhood association in its efforts to have the library built there.

== Neighborhood Institutions ==
- Ohev Sholom - The National Synagogue
- Congregation Tifereth Israel
- Alexander Shepherd Elementary School
- Shepherd Park Citizens' Association
- The Washington Ethical Society
- former Hanafi Madhab Center
- Shepherd Park Christian Church
- Shepherd Park Community Center

== Education ==
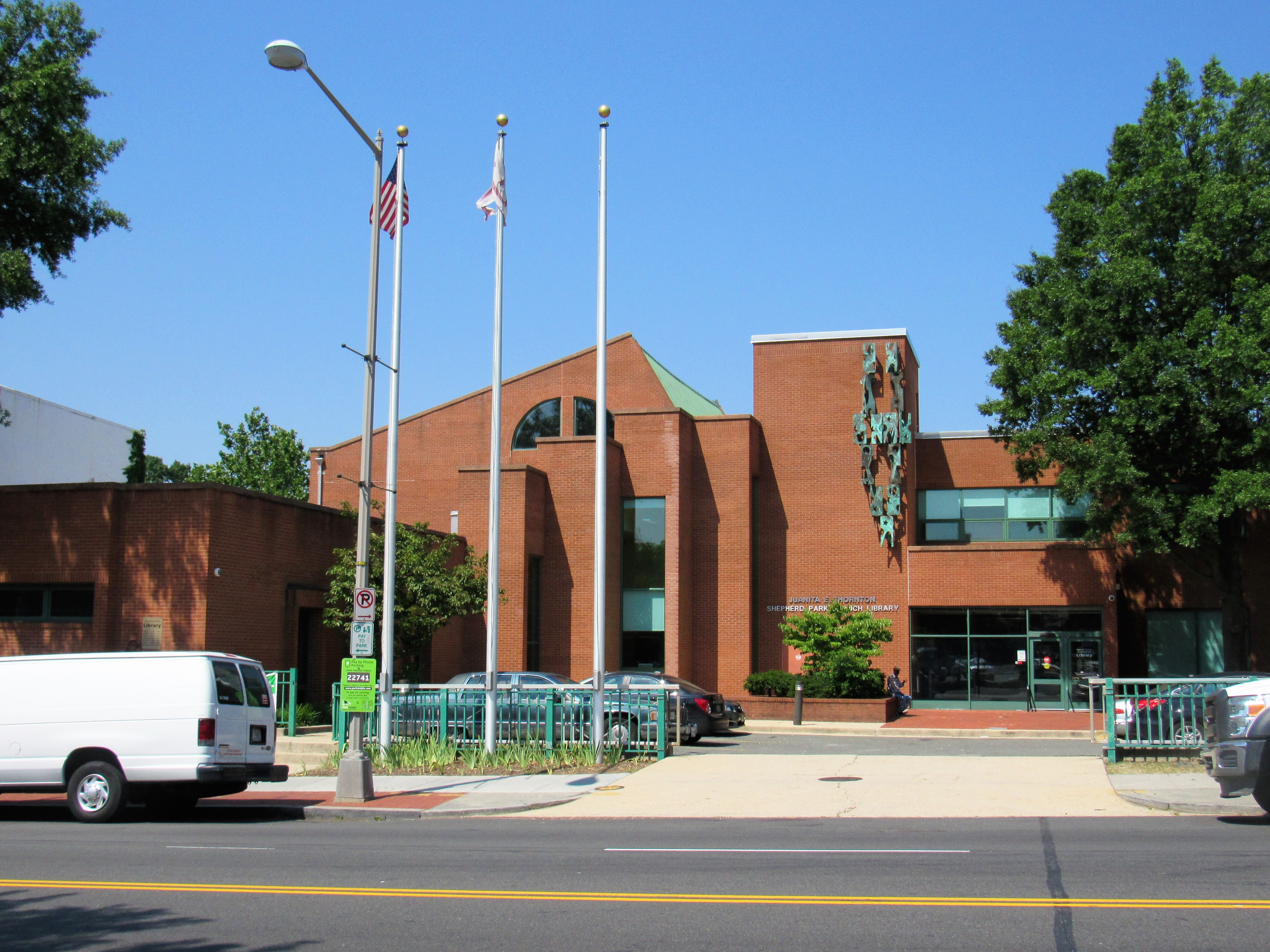
The Juanita E. Thornton/Shepherd Park Neighborhood Library in 2018

District of Columbia Public Schools operates public schools.

District of Columbia Public Library operates the Juanita E. Thornton/Shepherd Park Neighborhood Library, which opened in 1990.

== Juanita E. Thornton/Shepherd Park Neighborhood Library ==
Juanita E. Thornton/Shepherd Park Neighborhood Library is part of the District of Columbia Public Library (DCPL) System. It opened to the public on July 29, 1990.
