= Mosque No. 12 =

Mosque in Philadelphia, Pennsylvania, United States

- Location of the mosque in Philadelphia

Religion
- Affiliation: Islam

Location
- Location: 1319-21 West Susquehanna Avenue, Philadelphia, Pennsylvania
- Country: United States
- Coordinates: 39°59′10″N 75°09′17″W

Architecture
- Architect: Jacob Naschold

Mosque No. 12, also known as Masjid Makkah, is a mosque in Philadelphia, Pennsylvania. It came to prominence in the early 1960s when a building was leased by the Nation of Islam, converted for use as a mosque, and placed under the direction of Malcolm X, who was a minister there and at Mosque No. 7 until he left the organization for Sunni Islam in 1964.

== History ==
Originally built over a century ago for a trade school, it was leased as Mosque No. 12 of the Nation of Islam in 1962 (all Nation of Islam sites were initially called Temples; the NOI switched to the term mosque as a move to add to the Nation's legitimacy by adding elements from mainstream Islam). The mosque was later moved to 2508 North Broad Street.

Malcolm X was named minister of Temple No. 12 by Elijah Muhammad. When Malcolm X left the Nation of Islam, he started a Sunni Muslim mosque named Muslim Mosque Inc.

In 1974, four members of Mosque No. 12 were charged with killing the family of Hamaas Abdul Khaalis at the Hanafi American Mussulman's Rifle and Pistol Club. Khaalis was a leader of the Hanafis, a Sunni Muslim school of jurisprudence (fiqh), and the killers were upset by letters he had written that attacked Elijah Muhammad.

== See also ==
- Islam in the United States
- List of mosques in the United States
- Wallace Fard Muhammad
- Bibliography of Malcolm X
- Bibliography of Martin Luther King Jr.
