= List of incidents of political violence in Washington, D.C. =

There have been numerous incidents of political violence in Washington, D.C., the capital of the United States, as well as in the greater Washington Metropolitan area.

== 19th century ==
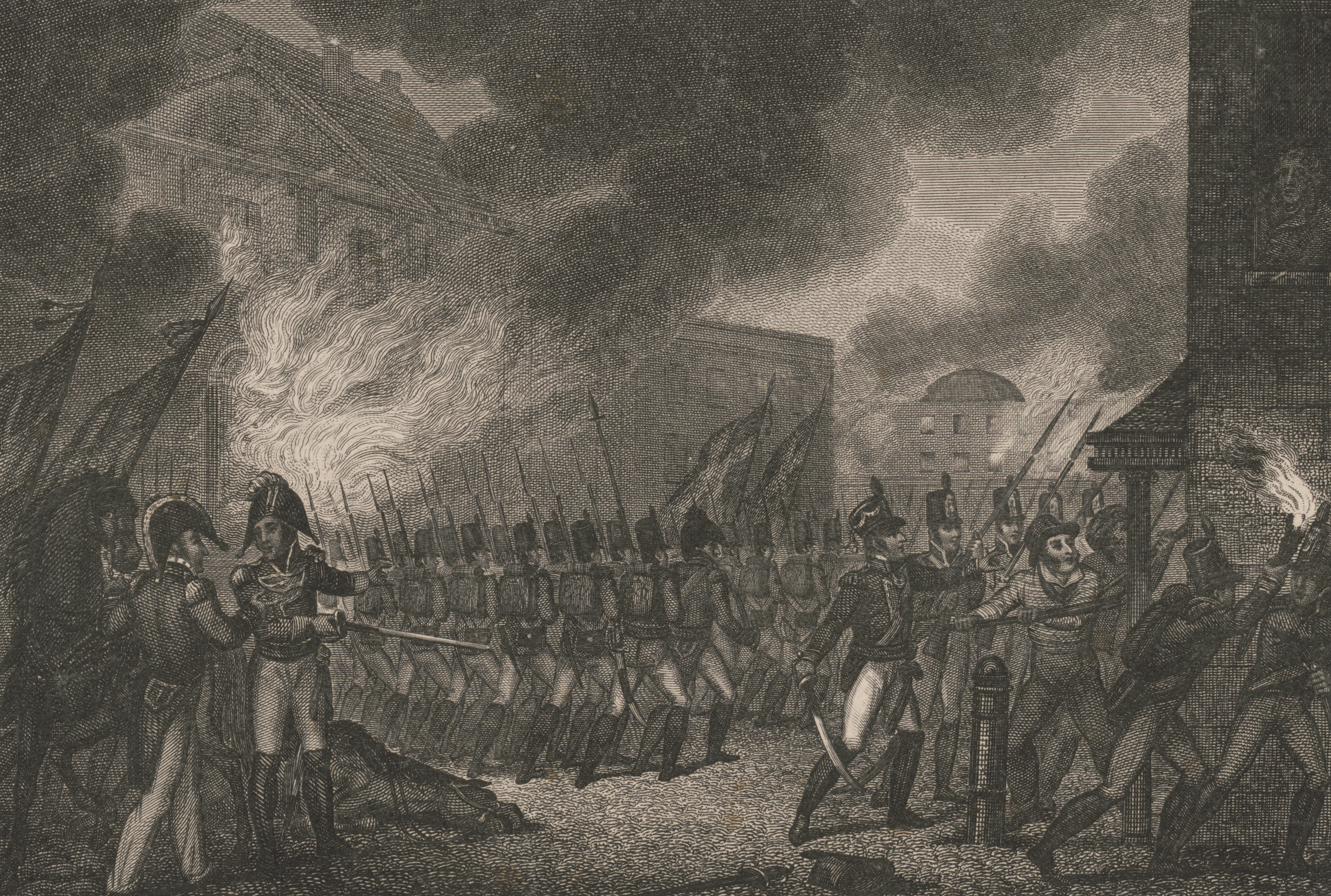
1815 illustration of the burning of Washington by British forces

- August 24, 1814: Burning of Washington: British forces led by George Cockburn invaded and occupied Washington during the Chesapeake campaign of the War of 1812, after defeating an American force at Bladensburg. In retaliation for acts of destruction by American troops in the Canadas, Cockburn's forces burnt several government buildings in the city, including the White House and the United States Capitol. The occupation only lasted for approximately 26 hours as a storm led to the British abandoning the city. To this date, it remains the only time since the American Revolutionary War that a foreign power has captured and occupied the capital of the United States.
- April 13, 1832: Sam Houston confronted Representative William Stanbery (OH-08) in Washington, D.C. and beat him repeatedly with a hickory walking stick after Stanbery accused him of profiteering off Andrew Jackson's forced relocation of Native Americans. During the fight Stanbery pulled a gun, placed it on Houston's chest, and pulled the trigger, but the gun misfired. Houston was arrested and charged with breaching the privileges of the House by assaulting Stanbery for remarks made from the floor.
- January 30, 1835: Just outside the U.S. Capitol, house painter Richard Lawrence aimed two flintlock pistols at President Andrew Jackson, but both misfired: one of them while Lawrence stood within 13 feet (4.0 m) of Jackson, and the other at point-blank range. Lawrence was apprehended after Jackson beat him down with a cane. At trial, Lawrence was found not guilty by reason of insanity and spent the remainder of his life in insane asylums.
- June 20, 1854: A fight between Representatives William M. Churchwell (TN-02) and William Cullom (TN-04) erupted on the floor of the U.S. House of Representatives. The difficulty between the two began a month earlier during a debate of the pro-slavery Kansas–Nebraska Act. Churchwell accused Cullom and Senator John Bell (TN) of defending the Missouri Compromise of 1820. The confrontation led to a resolution permitting the House to expel a representative who brings a concealed weapon into the chamber.

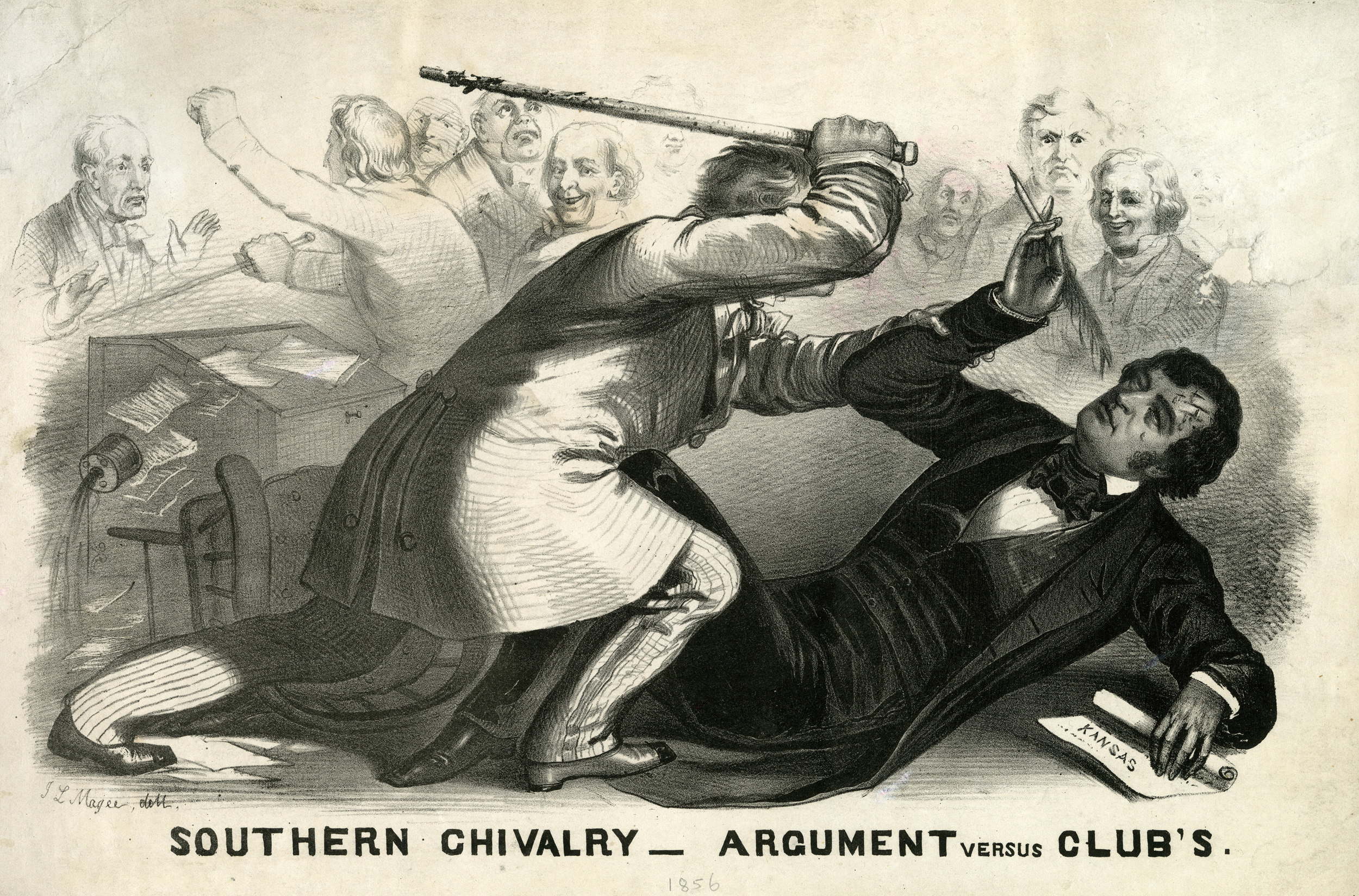
Lithograph of Preston Brooks' 1856 attack on Sumner; the artist depicts the assailant bludgeoning Sumner.

- May 22, 1856: Caning of Charles Sumner: Abolitionist Senator Charles Sumner (MA) was savagely beaten with a cane and nearly killed by pro-slavery Representative Preston Brooks (SC-04) on the floor of the U.S. Senate in retaliation for a speech criticizing slavery. It has been considered symbolic of the "breakdown of reasoned discourse" and the use of violence that eventually led to the American Civil War.
- February 5, 1858: During the 35th United States Congress, on February 5, 1858, Galusha A. Grow (PA) was physically attacked by Democrat Laurence M. Keitt (SC) in the House chambers, leading to a brawl between northerners and southerners. Keitt, offended by Grow's having stepped over to his side of the House chamber, dismissively demanded that Grow sit down, calling him a "black Republican puppy". Grow responded by telling Keitt that "No negro-driver shall crack his whip over me." Keitt became enraged and went for Grow's throat, shouting that he would "choke [him] for that". A large brawl involving approximately fifty representatives erupted on the House floor, ending only when a missed punch from Rep. Cadwallader Washburn (WI) upended the hairpiece of Rep. William Barksdale (MS). The embarrassed Barksdale accidentally replaced the wig backwards, causing both sides to erupt in spontaneous laughter.
- April 14, 1865: Assassination of Abraham Lincoln: President Abraham Lincoln was assassinated by John Wilkes Booth while attending the play Our American Cousin at Ford's Theatre. Shot in the head as he watched the play, Lincoln died the following day at 7:22 a.m. in the Petersen House opposite the theater. He was the first U.S. president to be assassinated, with his funeral and burial marking an extended period of national mourning. Occurring near the end of the American Civil War, the assassination was part of a larger conspiracy intended by Booth to revive the Confederate cause by eliminating the three most important officials of the U.S. government: the president, the vice president, and the secretary of state. After a dramatic initial escape, Booth was killed at the climax of a 12-day manhunt. His accomplices, Lewis Powell, David Herold, George Atzerodt and Mary Surratt, were later hanged for their roles in the conspiracy.
- June 14, 1866: A debate between Representative Josiah Grinnell (IA) and Representative Lovell Rousseau (KY) over a bill intended to increase the power of the Freedmen's Bureau devolves into both men insulting each other. Rousseau would insult the state of Iowa while Grinnell would insult the state of Kentucky alongside questioning Rousseau's military record. On June 14th Rosseau would approach Grinnell on the east portico of the US Capitol building and requested an apology. When Grinnell refused to do so he would be struck several times by Rousseau's cane. In response Rosseau would be censured by the House of Representatives.
- July 2, 1881: Assassination of James A. Garfield: President James A. Garfield was assassinated at 9:30 a.m. while he waited for a train at Washington's Baltimore and Potomac Railroad station on the National Mall (at the present location of the National Gallery of Art), less than four months after he took office. As the president was arriving at the train station, writer and lawyer Charles J. Guiteau shot him twice; one bullet grazed the president's shoulder, and the other pierced his back. Garfield lingered for eleven weeks before dying on September 19, 1881, at 10:35 p.m. of complications caused by infections, which were contracted by the doctors' relentless probing of his wound with unsterilized fingers and instruments. Guiteau was immediately arrested. After a highly publicized trial lasting from November 14, 1881, to January 25, 1882, he was found guilty and sentenced to death, which took place on June 30, 1882. Guiteau was assessed during his trial as mentally unbalanced, possibly due to the effects of syphilis on the brain. He claimed to have shot Garfield out of disappointment at being passed over for appointment as Ambassador to France.

== 20th century ==
- March 3, 1913: Woman Suffrage Procession: Between 5,000 and 10,000 people marched through Washington, D. C. in support of the women's suffrage movement. Organized by Alice Paul and Lucy Burns and sponsored by the National American Woman Suffrage Association, it turned violent when onlookers attacked the suffragists.
- July 2, 1915: A few minutes before midnight, the U.S. Senate reception room was bombed by Eric Muenter (a.k.a. Frank Holt), a German professor who wanted to stop American support of the Allies during World War I, attempting to kill vice president Thomas Marshall among others. The next morning he tried to assassinate J. P. Morgan Jr., son of the financier, at his home on Long Island, New York.

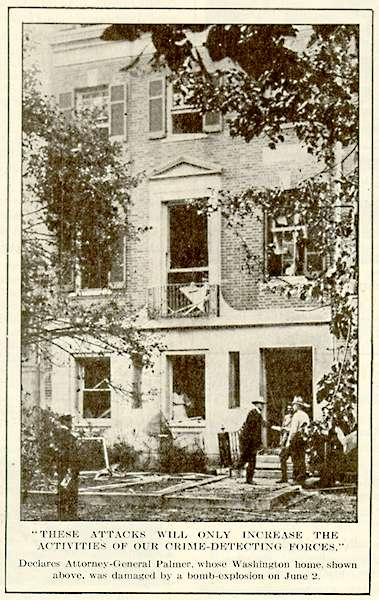
Damage done by the bomb at Attorney General A. Mitchell Palmer's house

- April 2, 1917: When a delegation of pacifists visited the U.S. Senate to oppose American entry into World War I, Senator Henry Cabot Lodge, the leading supporter of the war in the Senate, and pacifist Alexander Bannwart got into a fistfight in the corridors of the U.S. Senate.
- June 2, 1919: Attempted assassination of A. Mitchell Palmer during the 1919 United States anarchist bombings: Anarchists linked to Luigi Galleani exploded a bomb in front of U.S. Attorney General A. Mitchell Palmer's home at 2132 R Street, NW, Washington D.C. In April of the same year, a mail bomb was intercepted and defused before it reached Palmer. He would go on to lead the Palmer raids.
- July 28, 1932: Bonus Army Conflict: a group of 43,000 demonstrators – made up of 17,000 U.S. World War I veterans, together with their families and affiliated groups – gathered in Washington, D.C. to demand early cash redemption of their service certificates. U.S. Attorney General William D. Mitchell ordered the group to be removed from all government property. Washington police, met with resistance, shot at the protestors, and two veterans were wounded and later died. President Herbert Hoover then ordered the U.S. Army to clear the marchers' campsite. Army Chief of Staff General Douglas MacArthur commanded a contingent of infantry and cavalry, supported by six tanks. MacArthur's troops attacked the makeshift camp with tear gas and set fire to the huts and lean-tos of the veterans and their families, injuring 55. The Bonus Army veterans and their families were driven out and their shelters and belongings burned.
- November 1, 1950: Attempted assassination of Harry S. Truman: Griselio Torresola and Oscar Collazo, members of the Puerto Rican Nationalist Party, attempted to assassinate President Harry S. Truman at Blair House, killing White House Police officer Leslie Coffelt in the attempt. President Truman was staying there during the renovation of the White House.
- March 1, 1954: United States Capitol shooting: Puerto Rican nationalists led by Lolita Lebrón shot and injured five members of the House of Representatives during an immigration debate. They wanted to highlight their desire for Puerto Rican independence from the U.S. The assailants were arrested, tried and convicted in federal court, and imprisoned. In 1978 and 1979, their sentences were commuted by President Jimmy Carter; all four returned to Puerto Rico.
- April 4–8, 1968: Washington, D.C., riots: Following the Assassination of Martin Luther King Jr. on April 4, 1968, a four-day period of violent civil unrest erupted near the intersection of 14th and U Streets NW. Approximately 200 stores had their windows broken and 150 stores were looted, most of them emptied. Thirteen people were killed.
- May 10, 1970: A single homemade bomb, enclosed in a briefcase, exploded at the entrance to the National Guard Association of the United States. Windows in the building and surrounding area were blown out. The bombing occurred the night following a massive demonstration in D.C protesting the U.S. incursion into Cambodia. The radical left militant group called the Weather Underground Organization claimed responsibility for the attack.
- March 1, 1971: A bomb exploded in the United States Capitol, causing an estimated $300,000 in damage. The Weather Underground Organization claimed credit for the bombing, which was done in protest the U.S. bombing of Laos.
- January 18, 1973: Hanafi Muslim massacre: Several affiliates of the Black Mafia traveled to a house purchased for a group of Hanafi Muslims and murdered five children and two men. The target of the attack was Hamaas Abdul Khaalis, a former leader and critic of the Nation of Islam, who mailed letters to the ministers of all fifty mosques criticizing Elijah Muhammad. Seven individuals of the Black Mafia were tried and convicted. Khaalis would later lead the Hanafi Siege in 1977 to bring awareness to the killings.
- January 29, 1975: A device exploded in the third-floor women's bathroom of the U.S. Department of State, causing several walls to collapse and creating damage on five floors of the building. Damage was estimated at $350,000. A bomb threat was called into the Washington Post several minutes before the blast by the radical group the Weather Underground Organization. The group cited the continued war in Vietnam and Cambodia and the continued U.S. support for those governments.
- September 21, 1976: Assassination of Orlando Letelier: Orlando Letelier, a former member of the Chilean government, who was living in exile in the United States, was killed by a car bomb along with his assistant Ronni Moffitt. The killing was carried out by members of the Chilean secret police group, DINA. Declassified U.S. documents claim that Chilean army general and dictator Augusto Pinochet directly ordered the assassination. In 1978 the Junta and Pinochet claimed to no have known Michael Townley’s existence. General Contreras lied and assured them he had no connection to Townley several times. Based on those assurances, he was handed over to the U.S. Townley asked Contreras to "to tell his Excellency [Pinochet] the truth of this situation, so that he can use his authority as he can".
- March 9–11, 1977: Hanafi Siege: Three buildings in Washington, D.C. were seized by 12 "Hanafi Movement" gunmen, including the District Building (city hall), then called the John A. Wilson Building, B'nai B'rith headquarters and the Islamic Center of Washington. The siege was led by Hamaas Abdul Khaalis, who wanted to bring attention to the murder of his family in 1973 (See: January 18, 1973, above). The hostage takers held 149 people, two of whom died. After a 39-hour standoff, all hostages were released. All 12 were later tried and convicted.
- November 28, 1979: Suzanne Osgood, who had a history of mental problems and suffered from schizophrenia, stormed the reception room of Senator Ted Kennedy's (MA) office with a knife while he was present. Osgood attacked Secret Service agents, but was captured and turned over to Capitol police. After the attack, the security for Kennedy was increased for his presidential campaign.
- June 3, 1980: The Crestwood residence of Yugoslavian Chargé d'Affaires Vladimir Sindjelic was bombed by Croatian terrorists. A State Department official told The Washington Post that the bombing was a political act, an attempt to protest President Jimmy Carter's trip to Yugoslavia later that month.

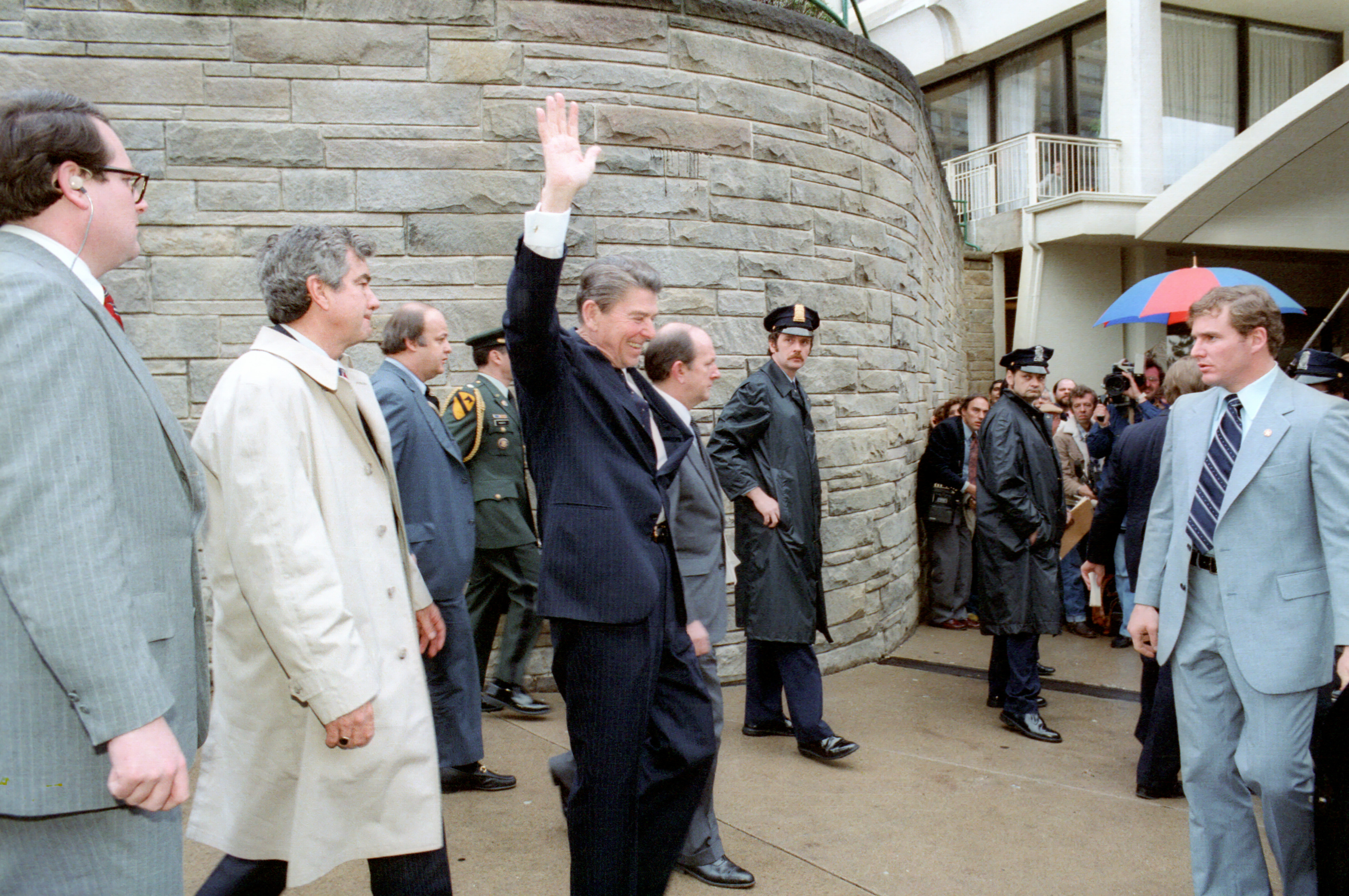
Ronald Reagan waves just before he is shot. From left are Jerry Parr, Press Secretary James Brady, Reagan, aide Michael Deaver, an unidentified policeman, policeman Thomas Delahanty, and secret service agent Timothy J. McCarthy.

- March 30, 1981: Attempted assassination of Ronald Reagan: President Ronald Reagan and three others were shot and wounded by John Hinckley Jr. after a speaking engagement by Reagan at the Hilton Washington. Hinckley believed the attack would impress actress Jodie Foster, with whom he had become obsessed. White House Press Secretary James Brady, Secret Service agent Tim McCarthy, and police officer Thomas Delahanty were also wounded. All three survived, but Brady suffered brain damage and was permanently disabled. His death in 2014 was considered a homicide because it was ultimately caused by this injury.
- December 7, 1981: A kidnapping of members of the Federal Reserve Board at the Federal Reserve headquarters building was attempted by James von Brunn, a white supremacist, neo-Nazi, and Holocaust denier. Von Brunn's motive was to raise awareness of alleged "treacherous and unconstitutional" acts by the Federal Reserve. He would later attack the United States Holocaust Memorial Museum on June 10, 2009.
- December 8, 1982: Norman Mayer, an anti-nuclear weapons activist and eccentric, drove a white van up to the base of the Washington Monument. Mayer claimed to have 1,000 pounds (450 kg) of explosives in the van, which he said he would use to destroy the monument unless a national dialogue on the threat of nuclear weapons was seriously undertaken. He held off police for ten hours before he started to roll the van towards the White House, at which point U.S. Park Police snipers shot Mayer dead. No explosives were found in the van.
- April 26, 1983: A bomb exploded at the National War College at Fort McNair in SW Washington, shattering windows and cracking walls in the building and doing $100,000 worth of damage but no injuries.
- August 18, 1983: A bomb went off at the Washington Navy Yard's Computer Center, doing minor damage and causing no injuries. The "Armed Resistance Unit," a cover name for the militant leftist group May 19th Communist Movement, claimed credit for the attack.
- November 7, 1983: United States Senate bombing: The "Armed Resistance Unit," a cover name for the militant leftist group May 19th Communist Movement, exploded a bomb on the second floor of the U.S. Capitol's north wing, causing estimated damages of $250,000. The bombing was a response to the U.S. invasion of Grenada.
- April 20, 1984: A bomb exploded at the Washington Navy Yard Officers Club. The "Armed Resistance Unit," a cover name for the militant leftist group May 19th Communist Movement, claimed credit for the attack.
- May 1991: 1991 Washington, D.C., riot
- September 12, 1994: Frank Eugene Corder flew a single-engine Cessna 150 into the White House South lawn, apparently trying to hit the White House. President Bill Clinton and the First Family were not home at the time. Corder died on impact and was the only casualty.
- October 29, 1994: Francisco Martin Duran used a rifle to fire at least 29 shots at the White House from a fence overlooking the north lawn, thinking that President Bill Clinton was among the men in dark suits standing on the lawn (Clinton was in the White House Residence watching a football game). Three tourists, Harry Rakosky, Ken Davis, and Robert Haines, tackled Duran before he could injure anyone. Duran was found to have a suicide note in his pocket, and was sentenced to 40 years in prison.
- July 24, 1998: United States Capitol shooting: Russell Eugene Weston Jr., a paranoid schizophrenic with a strong distrust of the Federal Government, opened fire at one of the U.S. Capitol's checkpoints and killed two Capitol police officers, one of whom had wounded Weston. Weston was not charged because of his mental condition and was sent to a Federal mental institution.

== 21st century ==
- February 7, 2001: Robert W. Pickett, an accountant who had been fired from the IRS thirteen years earlier, fired a number of shots from outside the White House; President George W. Bush was inside. Pickett was shot by a Secret Service officer and arrested: he was later found to have emotional problems and employment grievances, and sentenced in July 2001 to three years' imprisonment.
- September 11, 2001: United Airlines Flight 93, an airliner that was hijacked as part of the 9/11 attacks, was planned by the hijackers to crash into either the White House or the Capitol Building. The plane crashed in Pennsylvania after a passenger revolt.
- September 18 – October 12, 2001: 2001 anthrax attacks: Several letters containing anthrax spores were mailed to two Democratic U.S. Senators, Tom Daschle (SD) and Patrick Leahy (VT). The Senators were not injured but 31 staff members were infected and two postal workers at the Brentwood postal sorting facility died from anthrax exposure.
- June 10, 2009: United States Holocaust Memorial Museum shooting: James von Brunn, a white supremacist, neo-Nazi, and Holocaust denier, walked into the United States Holocaust Memorial Museum and shot a guard, who later died. Von Brunn was critically wounded when security guards immediately returned fire. Von Brunn later died on January 6, 2010, while awaiting trial. Previously, he had attempted to kidnap members of the Federal Reserve Board (See: December 7, 1981, above).
- November 11, 2011: White House shooting: Oscar Ramiro Ortega-Hernandez fired nine rifle shots at the White House. Two bullets struck the White House, one being stopped by ballistic glass in a window. No one was hurt in the incident. In the months before the shooting, Ortega-Hernandez began to believe that the U.S. government was controlling its citizens and needed to be stopped.
- August 15, 2012: Floyd Lee Corkins, II, attacked the Family Research Council and shot a security guard before the guard subdued him.
- May 29–31, 2020: During protests in Washington, D.C., following the murder of George Floyd, some demonstrators near the White House knocked down or attempted to breach security barriers, threw projectiles at law-enforcement officers, vandalized property, and set fires. On May 29, the security situation prompted the Secret Service to move President Trump to a secure White House bunker. More than 60 Secret Service personnel and at least 49 U.S. Park Police officers were injured during the unrest; at least 150 local and federal law-enforcement personnel were injured in Washington over approximately the first week of protests.
- November 14, 2020: Thousands of protesters rallied to support President Donald Trump's false claims of widespread election fraud perpetrated during the 2020 United States presidential election, believing that the election fraud was the direct cause of his losing the election. Attendees included white nationalists and members of far-right groups such as the Proud Boys, as well as counter-protestors from various far-left organizations. After nightfall, violence broke out between the attendees and counter-protesters. The latter began stealing MAGA hats and flags and proceeded to light them on fire. The chaos culminated at 8:00 p.m. when violence broke out five blocks east of the White House. The opposing groups charged each other, brawling for several minutes before police intervened. At least 10 were arrested and two officers were injured; one man was stabbed.
- December 12, 2020: Supporters of President Trump hosted a "Stop the Steal" rally at the Freedom Plaza, drawing 10,000–15,000 attendees. Nearby, about 200 members of the Proud Boys, dressed in combat fatigues and ballistic vests, carrying helmets, and reportedly using white nationalist signals, clashed with reported members of antifa. In fights between the two groups, 4 people were stabbed and at least 23 were arrested. Proud Boys leader Enrique Tarrio removed and burned a Black Lives Matter sign at Asbury United Methodist Church, one of Washington, D.C.'s oldest Black houses of worship. Tarrio was arrested on January 4, 2021, upon entering Miami on additional gun charges.

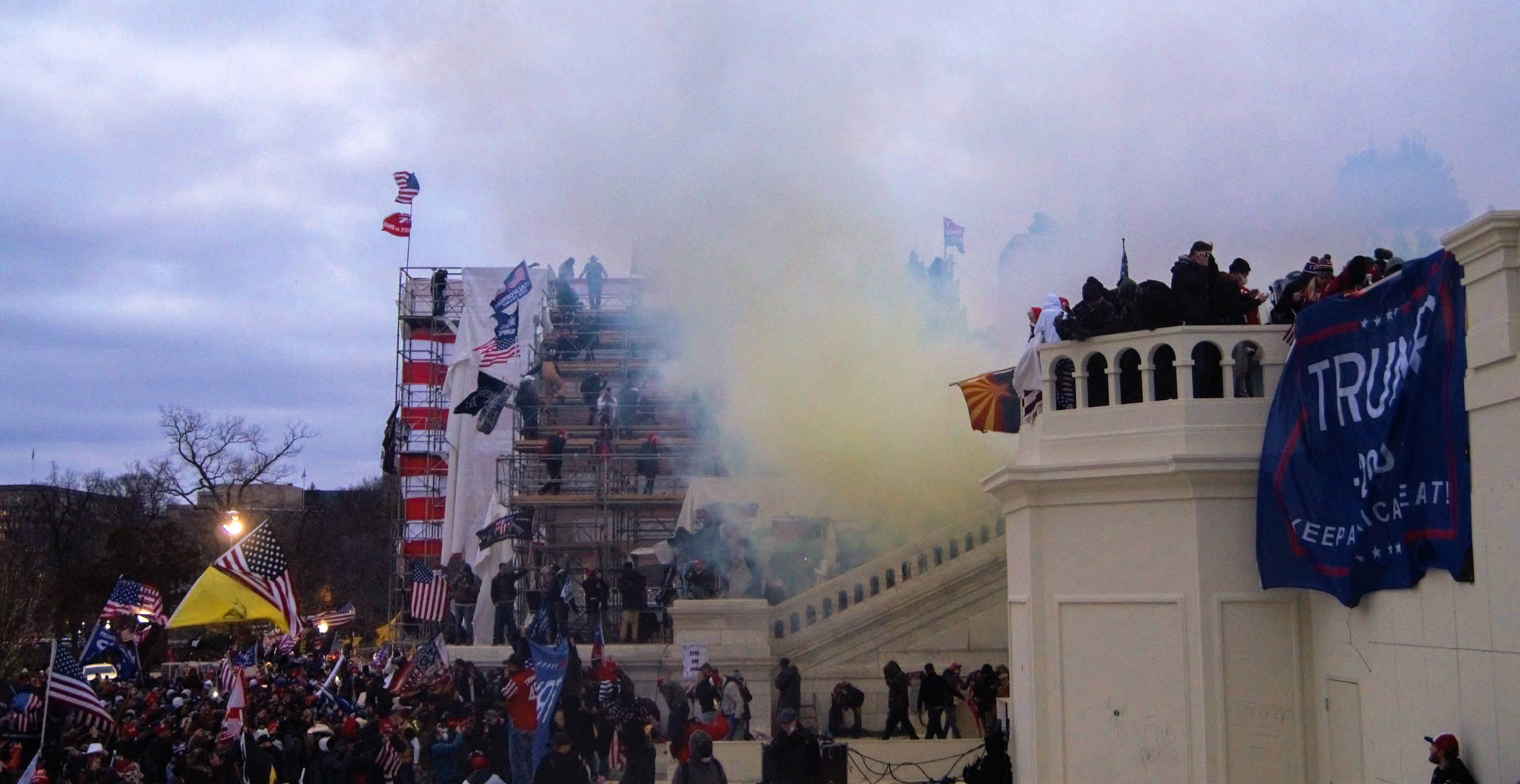
Police release tear gas outside the U.S. Capitol on January 6, 2021

- January 6, 2021: January 6 United States Capitol attack: A mob of rioters supporting President Trump's attempts to overturn the 2020 United States presidential election stormed the U.S. Capitol during speeches made by Trump and his allies at a rally. After breaching multiple police perimeters, they damaged the building and occupied parts of it for several hours. National Guard units from several states were called up to deal with the violence, while the riots resulted in five deaths (one rioter was shot by police, three rioters died of "medical emergencies," and one police officer later suffered a stroke and died), over 80 arrests, and nearly 140 injured officers. One Capitol Police officer also died by suicide after the event. Several high-profile members of the government and Capitol security resigned, including Betsy DeVos, Secretary of Education; Elaine Chao, Secretary of Transportation; Steven Sund, Chief of the Capitol Police; and the Sergeants-at-Arms of the House of Representatives and of the Senate. Over 70 other countries and international organizations expressed their concerns over the protests and condemned the violence.
- April 2, 2021: 2021 United States Capitol car attack: A man who was an alleged supporter of Louis Farrakhan and the Nation of Islam rammed into a protective barrier outside of the U.S Capitol, pinning a Capitol Police officer between his vehicle and the gate, and striking a second officer, who survived and was released from the hospital. The parents of the attacker, Noah Ricardo Green, say that he was mentally unstable, and had suffered brain injuries during his high school football career. He then got out and attempted to stab other officers. He was shot by the responding officers and died due to his injuries. The Capitol officer who was struck, Officer William Francis Evans, later succumbed to his injuries.
- August 19, 2021: A North Carolina man named Floyd Ray Roseberry parked a truck loaded with his attempt at an improvised explosive device near the Supreme Court and Library of Congress. He threatened to detonate his bomb unless Donald Trump was reinstated as president. He also claimed there were other bombs he had placed in the city.
- May 22, 2023: 2023 Lafayette Square U-Haul crash: A 19-year-old Indian national from Chesterfield, Missouri, was arrested after allegedly driving a rented U-Haul van into a barrier on the north side of Lafayette Square. A backpack and a Nazi flag were recovered from the truck.
- May 21, 2025: 2025 killing of Israeli Embassy workers in Washington, D.C.: A 31-year-old Chicago resident named Elias Rodriguez shot and killed Yaron Lischinsky and Sarah Milgrim in front of the Lillian & Albert Small Capital Jewish Museum in Washington. Both Lischinsky and Milgrim were staff of the Israeli Embassy in Washington D.C., and Rodriguez claimed to have targeted them in response to the Gaza war and Palestinian genocide.
- November 26, 2025: 2025 Washington, D.C., National Guard shooting: A 29-year-old Afghan national opened fire on two members of the West Virginia National Guard, injuring Andrew Wolfe and mortally wounding Sarah Beckstrom. Both were participating in the deployment of federal law enforcement and National Guard to Washington, D.C., ordered by president Donald Trump earlier that year.

== Washington metropolitan area ==
- May 15, 1972: Attempted assassination of Governor George Wallace: Arthur Bremer, an out-of-work janitor, shot George Wallace four times in the abdomen, who was speaking at a campaign rally outside a shopping center in Laurel, Maryland. One of the bullets was lodged into Wallace's spinal cord, leaving Wallace permanently paralyzed from the waist down. Bremer was sentenced to 53 years in prison for attempted murder, and was released on parole 35 years later in 2007.
- May 19, 1972: A bomb exploded in the fourth-floor women's restroom of the Pentagon, in Arlington County, Virginia. Part of a wall was blown out and other damage was caused, resulting in about $80,000 in damages. The explosion occurred on Ho Chi Minh's birthday, several days before a planned demonstration to protest Nixon's increased bombing of North Vietnam and the mining of North Vietnamese harbors. The Weather Underground Organization took credit for the attack, citing a "retaliation for the Nixon administration's bombing of Hanoi.

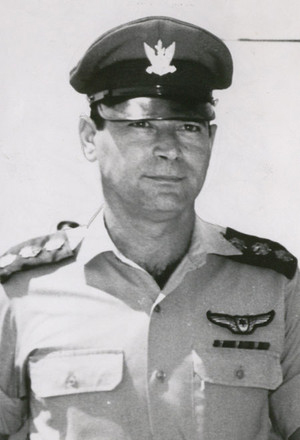
Yosef Alon

- June 1, 1973: Yosef Alon, the Israeli Air Force attaché in Washington, D.C., was shot and killed outside his home in Chevy Chase, Maryland. The Palestinian militant group Black September was suspected, though the case remains unsolved.
- July 22, 1980: Ali Akbar Tabatabai, an Iranian exile and critic of Ayatollah Khomeni, was shot in his Bethesda, Maryland, home. Dawud Salahuddin, an American Muslim convert, was apparently paid by Iranians to kill Tabatabai.
- January 25, 1993: CIA headquarters shooting: Pakistani national Mir Aimal Kasi opened fire on cars waiting at the stop light outside the George Bush Center for Intelligence, the CIA headquarters campus in Langley, Virginia, killing two CIA employees and injuring three others.

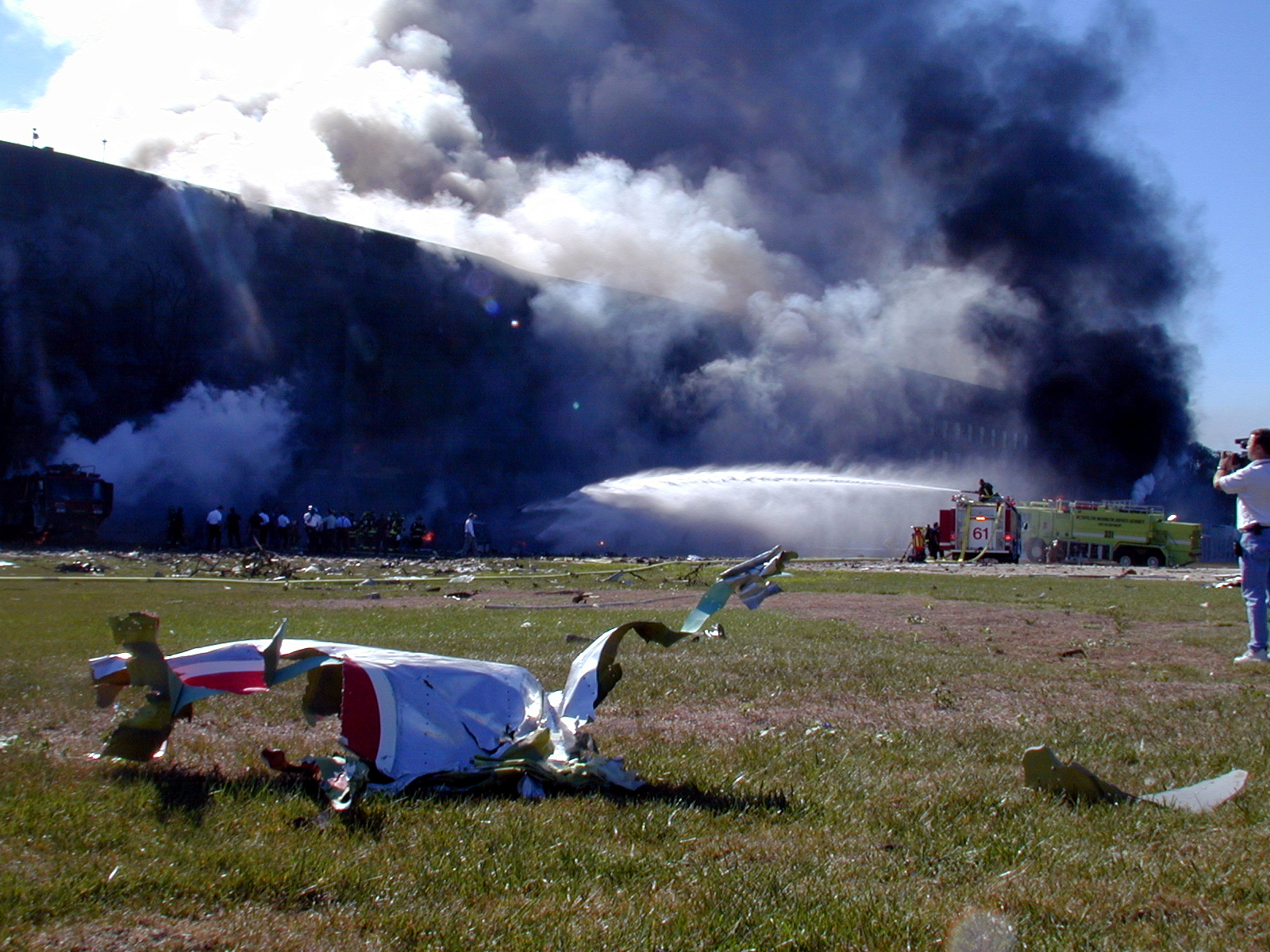
Debris from American Airlines Flight 77 scattered near the Pentagon

- September 11, 2001: September 11 attacks: Five Al-Qaeda hijackers flew American Airlines Flight 77 into the Pentagon. All 53 passengers, six crew, and the five hijackers on board the plane were killed, along with 115 Pentagon employees and 10 contractors in the building. Another plane heading for the U.S. Capitol crashed in a field in Somerset County, Pennsylvania, as passengers and crew attempted to regain control.
- October 2 – 24, 2002: D.C. sniper attacks: John Allen Muhammad and Lee Boyd Malvo coordinated a series of shootings in Washington, D.C., Maryland, and Virginia. Ten people were killed and three were critically wounded. The duo's crime spree began earlier in 2002 with robberies across the U.S., in which they killed seven people and wounded seven others. They were apprehended by police on October 24. Muhammad was sentenced to death and Malvo, a juvenile, was sentenced to six consecutive life sentences without parole. At the 2006 trial of Muhammad, Malvo testified that the aim of the killing spree was to kidnap children for the purpose of extorting money from the government.
- March 1, 2007: Paul Joyal, a security analyst and critic of the administration of Russian president Vladimir Putin, was shot and wounded in front of his Adelphi, Maryland, home. The shooting occurred four days after Joyal told Dateline NBC that the murder of former KGB agent Alexander Litvinenko served as a warning to all critics of the Putin government. There was speculation that the shooting may have been in retaliation for the interview. The case is still unsolved.
- March 4, 2010: Pentagon shooting: John Patrick Bedell shot and wounded two Pentagon police officers at a security checkpoint in the Pentagon station of the Washington Metro rapid transit system in Arlington County, Virginia. The officers returned fire, striking him in the head. He died later from his injuries.
- September 1, 2010: James Lee entered the Discovery Channel headquarters building in downtown Silver Spring, Maryland, carrying a gun and explosives. Taking hostages, he held off police for several hours before he was shot and killed. Mr. Lee had issues with the Discovery Channel about their broadcasts dealing with the environment.
- June 14, 2017: Congressional baseball shooting: During a practice session for the annual Congressional Baseball Game for Charity in Alexandria, Virginia, James Hodgkinson shot U.S. House Majority Whip Steve Scalise and three others. A ten-minute shootout took place between Hodgkinson and officers from the Capitol and Alexandria Police before they fatally shot Hodgkinson, who died from his wounds later that day at the George Washington University Hospital. The Virginia Attorney General concluded that Hodgkinson, "fueled by rage against Republican legislators, decided to commit an act of terrorism."
- May 2, 2021: A man, whose name has not yet been released, attempted to enter the campus of the Langley, Virginia CIA facility after multiple prior attempts. The man, who was, by some reports, mentally ill, was stopped by armed guards, and was ordered to leave his car. He refused, and a standoff was initiated. FBI officers arrived, but a couple hours later, he exited his vehicle and claimed he had a gun, before moving erratically towards them. He was then shot by one of the FBI agents, and died the next day. The FBI is investigating the incident in order to figure out the motive of the man. The FBI later reported that, despite the man's repeated claims, he was not in fact armed.

== See also ==
- Legislative violence
- List of incidents of civil unrest in the United States
- List of protest marches on Washington, D.C.
- List of terrorist incidents in the United States
- List of United States presidential assassination attempts and plots
- Timeline of violent incidents at the United States Capitol
- Terrorism in the United States
- Timeline of Washington, D.C.
- White House intruders
