= Mental health of Latin-American refugees in the United States =

Hispanic immigrants living in the United States have been found to have higher levels of exposure to trauma and lower mental health service utilization than the general population. Those who met the criteria for asylum and experience trauma before migrating are vulnerable to post-traumatic stress disorder (PTSD) symptoms. Higher levels of trauma-related symptoms are associated with increased post-migration living difficulties. Despite the need for mental health services for Hispanic immigrants living in the United States, cultural and structural barriers make accessing treatment challenging.

== Trauma exposure among immigrants ==
Immigrants fleeing violence, undocumented immigrants, and immigrants seeking asylum report elevated levels of psychological distress and exposure to trauma. The stressful events that contribute to these poor mental health outcomes can occur before, during, and after migration. This, in combination with access to care, resettlement experience, type of trauma, and demographic factors all interact to determine the severity of symptoms. PTSD is less common among immigrants who have not experienced political violence. A review of studies on international immigrants also did not identify an increased risk of depression within the average immigrant population. Trauma among immigrant populations depends on the context and culture of each group. The research cannot be generalized to apply to all immigrant populations.

=== Pre-migration trauma ===
Research on PTSD and trauma among immigrant populations frequently categorizes traumatic events as pre-migration, migration, and post-migration trauma. Each stage involves a different set of risk factors. Pre-migration trauma refers to traumatic events experienced before immigration. In a study of Honduran, Columbian, and Guatemalan immigrants seeking refuge in the United States, 83% cited violence as a main reason for fleeing their country, and 87% reported experiencing traumatic events. This was correlated with higher rates of PTSD, depression, and combined PTSD with depression. Refugees who flee political violence present with similar levels of psychopathology as well.

=== Migration trauma ===
Migration trauma refers to traumatic events experienced during the process of migration. Individuals immigrating from Latin America to the United States by foot or land are the most vulnerable during their migratory journey. A study on migration trauma among women immigrating from Central America, South America, and Mexico identified instances of violence, deprivation, and fear. Some women reported sexual assault, rape, or transactional sex during their migration. Interpersonal trauma such as rape or physical violence is associated with higher levels of PTSD, and combined PTSD with depression.

=== Post-migration trauma ===
Post-migration trauma refers to trauma experienced once the individual arrives in their destination country. In the United States, Hispanic immigrants may face parent-child separation at the border, limited access to services, discrimination, and mistrust. This can increase the risk of developing mental health disorders, and worsen the effects of previous traumas.

=== Exploring Immigration as a Social Determinant of Health ===
Exploring immigration as a social determinant of health carries with it a wider sphere of future policy and health implications that raise the conversation of holistically and structurally expanding how we perceive factors impacting health. Explorations in the field have drawn on wider holistic approaches that include; living and working conditions, healthcare accessibility, immigration and border enforcement, income disparities and poverty, along with gender, sexuality, race, and ethnic hierarchies. Pioneers in the research of this conversation such as Heide Castañeda, attempt to build off structural factors that are often left unaddressed in public health settings. In addressing these larger factors at play Castaneda states, "No nation has remained untouched by human mobility" but also extends to include that considering the causes for migration as completely "natural", neglects much deeper problems at play.

Castañeda states, "There's nothing natural about human displacement. Global patterns of inequality that lead to migration are rooted in specific social, political, and economic conditions; they reproduce by specific structures, policies, and institutions; and to gloss over the root causes of population movements is an injustice to the people affected by them."

This conversation then goes on to understand that while immigration can itself work in the sphere of the social determinants of health - it is also a "consequence" of the social determinants.

While much more is yet to be understood about the implications of this framework, there have already been strong associations made between border enforcement and policy and its public health impacts on migrant communities. Strong criticisms condemning international immigration policies have been made by various highly regarded medical journals One of major humanitarian concerns has been the detainment and separation of children from their families, particularly the U.S-Mexico border. According to the United Nations Children's Fund, in the years 2015 and 2016, approximately "300,000 unaccompanied and separated children who moved across borders were registered in 80 countries."

In the United States alone, it was accessed by the U.S Department of Health and Human Services that the department had 10,773 unaccompanied children within its custody in the year 2018, believed to be exacerbated by Trump's Zero Tolerance Policy.

== Barriers in access to psychological and psychiatric care ==
Individuals immigrating to the United States from Latin America, especially those who qualify for asylum, have an increased need for mental health treatment. Hispanic immigrants, however seek treatment at disproportionately lower rates. Cultural barriers to care (attitudes and social perceptions that impact one's willingness to use services), structural barriers to care (external systems of limitation), and refugee-specific barriers to care (e.g., immigration status, confidentiality concerns, and trust) account for much of this disparity.

=== Cultural barriers to care ===
Cultural barriers that affect the utilization of mental health care within the Hispanic immigrant community encompass issues such as stigma and the familiarity with Western mental health paradigms. Studies have illuminated a noteworthy association between societal stigma and the reduced inclination to seek mental health treatment among Hispanic immigrants. While there is evidence demonstrating the ability of Hispanic immigrants in the United States to identify typical indications of depression, the transferability of this awareness to conditions like post-traumatic stress disorder (PTSD) remains less established. Given the prevalence of culturally specific trauma syndromes in Hispanic populations, further investigation is imperative to ascertain whether challenges arise in recognizing Western interpretations of PTSD and whether this has an impact on the willingness to pursue treatment.

=== Structural barriers to care ===
Structural barriers to care refers to external systems that limit one's ability to receive appropriate services. Among a sample of Hispanic immigrants, the most reported structural barriers to care included cost (59%), lack of insurance (35%), and limited English proficiency (31%). Those with an existing mental disorder also experienced more cost barriers than those without an existing mental disorder. Other frequently cited structural barriers to care within Hispanic immigrant populations include immigration status, treatment method, and unfamiliarity with mental health services.

== Post-migration living difficulties ==
Immigrants arriving with limited resources experience post-migration living difficulties – stressors that impact their ability to support themselves and engage with society. The direct causal association between post-migration living difficulties and psychopathology is unproven.

=== Impact of trauma on post-migration living difficulties ===
There is a strong relationship between PTSD symptoms and post-migration living difficulties. Trauma has been shown to be passed down generations, long after the initial migration. This transgenerational trauma hinders their ability to parent their children. Children grow up embodying the negative emotional traits of their caretakers. A study on post-migration living difficulties among Latina immigrants found that emotional distress and difficulties building trust impacted one's ability to build strong social connections post migration. This led to recommendations that asylum policies and procedures focus on reducing post-migration problems.

== See also ==
- Immigration
- PTSD
