= 1973 Brooklyn hostage crisis =

Hostage-taking and standoff in Brooklyn, New York

- Location: 40°41′50.8″N 73°56′8.9″W; Brooklyn, New York City, United States
- Date: January 19, 1973; 53 years ago
- Target: John and Al's Sports, Inc.
- Attack type: Robbery, shootout, standoff
- Weapons: Handguns, shotguns, rifles
- Deaths: 1 (police officer)
- Injuries: 3 (two police officers, one perpetrator)
- Perpetrators: Shulab Abdur Raheem; Dawd A. Rahman; Yusef Abdallah Almussadig; Salih Ali Abdullah
- Motive: Acquisition of firearms for self-defense

Over the course of 47 hours from January 19 to January 21, 1973, four robbers in Brooklyn, New York City, took hostages and engaged in a standoff with the New York City Police Department (NYPD). One police officer was killed, and two officers and a perpetrator were injured, all within the first three hours of the incident; there were no further casualties during the standoff.

The incident began on the morning of January 19, when Shulab Abdur Raheem (24), Dawd A. Rahman (22), Yusef Abdallah Almussadig (23), and Salih Ali Abdullah (26) robbed the John and Al's sporting goods store to acquire weapons for self-defense. The four African American Sunni Muslim men were spurred by the 1973 Hanafi Muslim massacre in Washington, D.C. a day prior. NYPD officers responding to the robbery confronted them, sparking a shootout followed by a lengthy standoff when the perpetrators retreated back into the store and took twelve hostages. The NYPD used crisis negotiation techniques pioneered by detective and psychologist Harvey Schlossberg to peacefully ensure the release and rescue of all twelve hostages and the surrender and arrest of all four perpetrators.

The incident, one of the longest standoffs in the NYPD's history, led to a shift in the standoff tactics of the NYPD and American law enforcement, who had previously believed standoffs were best resolved using lethal shock and awe attacks. It also highlighted the need for proper crisis negotiation and de-escalation in policing, and cemented Schlossberg as a "father of modern police psychology" as the NYPD and other agencies sought to learn from the events of the standoff. The incident has since been described in retrospect as the "birthplace of hostage negotiation".

== Background ==
John and Al's Sports, Inc. was a sporting goods store at 927 Broadway, straddling the border of the Bushwick and Bedford–Stuyvesant neighborhoods of Brooklyn. The store opened in the 1930s and had been the victim of robberies "at least once every three months". Its founder, Speilberger, was killed during one such robbery in 1967. By 1973, the store's owners were Samuel Rosenblum and Jerry Riccio, employees of Speilberger who took over after his death.

Harvey Schlossberg had recently been promoted from traffic officer to the NYPD's head psychologist after Police Commissioner Patrick V. Murphy learned he had a doctorate in clinical psychology. At the time, the NYPD did not have a fixed protocol for hostage situations, but recent incidents such as the 1971 Attica Prison riot and 1972 Munich massacre made developing one more of a pressing concern. Schlossberg had disdain for contemporary police attitudes on hostage rescue, which centered around close-quarters combat and deadly force with more emphasis on defeating the hostage-takers than saving the hostages, as "cops refused to negotiate with killers". Schlossberg promoted a more introspective approach, believing that forming a bond with the hostage-takers, analyzing their psyche, attempting to find solutions to their problems, and focusing on rescuing the hostages could lead to a peaceful resolution. He also believed in using patience and delays to draw out the standoff, which "allowed more time for the criminals to make mistakes and, just as crucially, to develop a rapport with their victims, leaving the hostage-takers less likely to harm them".

A day prior to the incident, on January 18, seven Hanafi Sunni Muslims were murdered by the Black Mafia in Washington, D.C. after Hamaas Abdul Khaalis, an associate of Malcolm X and a family member of the victims, voiced strong opposition to the Nation of Islam. The perpetrators of the January 19 hostage-taking, all of whom were African American Sunni Muslims and had also voiced their opposition to the Nation of Islam, later claimed in court that the D.C. massacre was what spurred them to acquire weapons, in the event they had to defend themselves from a similar attack.

== Incident ==
=== January 19 ===
On Friday, January 19, 1973, at around 5:00 pm, Raheem, Rahman, Almussadig, and Abdullah entered John and Al's and began browsing the store's merchandise. After a few minutes, they suddenly drew a sawed-off shotgun and three handguns, and demanded firearms and ammunition for self-defense. Only referring to each other as "one", "two", "three", and "four", the perpetrators armed themselves with additional weapons from the store, including rifles.

The NYPD's 90th Precinct was alerted to the robbery around 5:30 pm by the store's silent alarm and a student from Bushwick High School who managed to escape. When the first responding officers arrived at 5:42 pm, the perpetrators exited the store on Melrose Street using owner Rosenblum as a human shield and exchanged fire with them. It is unclear who fired first, but during the exchange Officer Jose Adorno was struck in the arm and Almussadig was struck in the abdomen, while Rosenblum managed to escape. The perpetrators promptly retreated back into the store with twelve hostages. This sparked a shootout between them and police, prompting the activation and deployment of the NYPD's Emergency Service Unit (ESU). The battle was reportedly chaotic and comparable to a "war zone", with one officer recalling in his memoir that he came under fire almost immediately upon arriving on scene, returned fire from under his police car in the general direction of the store, and only learned hostages were a factor later in the standoff. Officers shot out streetlights to provide more concealment, before power to the area was cut at an indeterminate point.

At around 6:10 pm, ESU Officer Stephen R. Gilroy (29) was shot in the head and killed while taking a position behind an elevated railway pillar. Officer Frank Carpentier was struck in his knee while moving his car to shield Gilroy's position in an attempt to rescue him or retrieve his body, and was rescued by an ESU team that laid suppressive fire on the perpetrators to cover their extraction. NYPD officers did not fire again for the rest of the standoff.

By 7:05 pm, the NYPD had established a safe perimeter and a command post at 921 Broadway; up to six additional command posts would be established elsewhere along Broadway for various purposes. The NYPD opted to use Schlossberg's crisis negotiation techniques to reason with the perpetrators and use patience to coerce them into peacefully releasing the hostages and surrendering. This was against the wishes of numerous police officers at the scene who sought retribution for Gilroy's death, as well as another NYPD psychologist who recommended an assault on the store using tear gas.

After the perpetrators ripped out the store's phone lines, police used a megaphone to communicate with them, resulting in the release of a hostage around 8:00 pm. She told police the perpetrators would kill the hostages if they were not allowed to leave. Around 9:00 pm, the perpetrators indicated they needed a doctor, but refused a request to surrender in exchange for medical treatment.

The NYPD deployed their Emergency Rescue Vehicle (ERV), an unarmed M113 armored personnel carrier nicknamed "Annie" or "The Tank", to rescue officers and civilians trapped along the streets and in stores across from John and Al's. During this operation, which lasted from approximately 9:00 pm to 11:00 pm, the perpetrators fired around 40 shots at the ERV to no effect. Police noticed there was psychological value in the ERV's presence as the perpetrators "always got preoccupied with it", and used it for negotiations, positioned in close proximity to the storefront. Other rescues of uninvolved bystanders were also conducted around the same time; for instance, an elevated train with its lights off was sent to extract stranded passengers at a nearby platform before the line was promptly shut down. However, residents of nearby apartments, as well as apparently people in some establishments, were ordered to remain inside until the standoff was resolved. This frustrated locals, some of whom attempted to leave anyway, including patrons of a pool hall who used a ladder to leave on their own after several hours of waiting.

Overnight, the hostages slept in sleeping bags, overseen by the perpetrators at gunpoint from a mezzanine in the store.

=== January 20 ===
On Saturday, January 20, at 12:50 am, another hostage was released, carrying a note urging Muslims to unite, as well as requests for food and medical attention. At 4:00 am, Reverend Roy Brown of a Christian church in the area attempted to negotiate with the suspects from the ERV to no response. Forty minutes later, another attempt was made by three imams. This time, the perpetrators allowed one imam to enter the store; he returned five minutes later and told police the perpetrators stated they were "willing to die for Allah". However, Schlossberg argued the perpetrators were merely bluffing, citing their requests for food and medical care as proof they wanted to live.

Attempts to communicate using the same imams at 9:25 am saw no response, prompting the NYPD to try using different individuals. At 11:15 am, police gave the perpetrators a walkie-talkie to replace the megaphone they were given prior, but when Deputy Commissioner Benjamin Ward spoke through it, both the walkie-talkie and the megaphone were thrown out of the store. At 2:45 pm, lawyers Sanford Katz and Gerald B. Lefcourt offered to represent the perpetrators at trial, but were met by six shots at the ERV; when they urged the perpetrators to take the walkie-talkie and the ERV backed away, a hostage was sent out to retrieve it. At 3:15 pm, the walkie-talkie was used to request sandwiches, cigarettes, and medical supplies; the sandwiches and cigarettes were approved, but the medical supplies were only promised once the perpetrators surrendered. News reports mention that relatives of the perpetrators were also sent to communicate with them, though it is unclear exactly when these occurred or whether the perpetrators responded.

Around 4:00 pm, Dr. Thomas W. Matthews, head of the National Economic Growth and Reconstruction Organization and Interfaith Hospital, arrived with a nurse, having been summoned by the NYPD. An offer was made for Matthews to treat Almussadig if he was brought out of the store, but the perpetrators made a counteroffer to release one hostage in exchange for Matthews and the nurse entering the store to treat Almussadig and serve as intermediaries. After "great consideration", the NYPD agreed, and the exchange was made. Matthews and the nurse returned forty minutes later with the names and telephone numbers of the nine remaining hostages; around this time, the sandwiches and cigarettes requested by the perpetrators arrived and were placed outside the store.

By 6:30 pm, the NYPD had formed a "think tank" of police officials including Commissioner Murphy, city government officials, Federal Bureau of Investigation agents, psychologists, and airport officials, among others, to look into different contingencies and possibilities for how the situation could evolve and what police could do. Assaulting the store was deemed a "last resort" out of fears the perpetrators could be revered as martyrs. Schlossberg told his superiors that if all else failed, they could simply let the perpetrators go in exchange for the hostages' safety, reasoning police could "always catch the criminals later", which Ward agreed with. Letting the perpetrators leave was apparently seriously considered, to the point that the Port Authority Police Department had a car prepared to drive them to John F. Kennedy International Airport so they could leave the United States. However, this was never offered to the perpetrators, and when one perpetrator briefly mentioned acquiring a travel visa during negotiations on January 21, Ward quickly changed the topic to ensure it would not be brought up again.

Around 8:00 pm, Matthews reentered the store with orange juice and medical supplies. Forty minutes later, the nurse was sent in with a field telephone to replace the walkie-talkie, as its batteries were dying. They both left the store at 11:40 pm. Matthews stated that Almussadig had a fever, and was potentially suffering from blood poisoning and an infection in his intestines, with a chance of death if he did not receive emergency treatment. Matthews and the nurse also had a letter from the perpetrators in Arabic "telling all oppressed people to fight against their oppressors", and stated the perpetrators were apologetic for Gilroy's death (having learned they had killed him from a radio inside the store), but insisted the NYPD fired first and stated it was revenge for Almussadig's wounding. Reviewing the information from the perpetrators up to that point, Schlossberg deduced they "had not really formulated their own ideologies", and that their attempts at tying the robbery to vague political and religious causes were merely rationalization.

=== January 21 ===
On Sunday, January 21, the NYPD began moving to enclose the scene and break the siege. During the early morning, barbed wire was placed on Melrose Street to prevent attempts at fleeing, and the NYPD's Aviation Unit took aerial photographs of the store for planning. Apparently sensing something, at 7:45 am, the perpetrators fired nine shots at a parked police car and stores across the street, and attempts to call them went unanswered. By 9:00 am, the "think tank" had proposed four entry methods: using explosives to breach the store, using a wrecking ball to the same effect, flooding the store with tear gas to incapacitate the perpetrators, or tunneling beneath the store to enter from below. The ESU opted for the fourth approach and began moving drilling equipment to the basement of the furniture store next to John and Al's.

By now, a massive crowd of spectators had formed at the perimeter, and news of the standoff had reached well across New York City. People stood on cars for a better view, to the point that The Village Voice writer Clark Whelton recalled seeing cars pressed to the ground from how many people were standing on them. The crowd was a source of great tension and interference: in one instance, Whelton described seeing a photographer attempt to take a picture of the incident with their camera's flash on, which police mistook for a muzzle flash, prompting numerous officers to dive for cover or check themselves and others for injuries; all journalists present were promptly moved into a nearby movie theater. Some witnesses who sympathized with the perpetrators raised their fists in solidarity, while off-duty police officers and firefighters arrived to see what was happening, adding to the already tense atmosphere of the heavy police presence. Rumors spread surrounding the incident, including that the perpetrators were members of the Black Liberation Army or that the police were waiting for an armored train to arrive on the elevated railway. The crowd apparently viewed the standoff as little more than an entertaining spectacle, with some saying it was "better than the Super Bowl", and several people became increasingly frustrated with the inaction over time, throwing bottles and attempting to breach police lines. Whelton summarized the general mood: "Half the people want the gunmen to come out fighting. The other half want the cops to go in shooting. Everybody wants blood." This frustrated the NYPD, especially Schlossberg, who feared the crowd and the media could negatively affect negotiations.

At 12:45 pm, Riccio convinced the perpetrators to leave the hostages in a specific corner of the store where they would supposedly be out of the line of fire. Unbeknownst to the perpetrators, in this corner was a half-inch plasterboard wall that hid a stairwell leading to the roof of the store. While the perpetrators went to investigate the sounds of the ESU moving the drilling equipment into the furniture store next door, the hostages broke through the wall and climbed the stairs to the roof. They were met by ESU officers who lowered a ladder from an adjoining roof, allowing all nine to escape. The perpetrators attempted to reach the roof from another stairwell but were unable to, as they had barricaded it earlier.

With the hostages now secure, the NYPD prepared for the possibility that the perpetrators would attempt a last stand as they had threatened to earlier. Sporadic gunfire erupted from the store throughout the day to no effect. Around 4:55 pm, after a brief prayer, Raheem, Rahman, and Abdullah, carrying Almussadig on a cot, exited the store and surrendered to police. Raheem, Rahman, and Abdullah were apprehended and led away by waiting detectives, while Almussadig was taken to Kings County Hospital Center to treat his injuries.

== Aftermath ==
=== Trial and sentencing ===
In 1974, the trial of the four perpetrators was held at the New York Supreme Court in Brooklyn. The defense contended that the robbery only occurred to acquire weapons for self-defense because "they feared attacks by their rivals, the Black Muslims", spurred by the killings of seven Sunni Muslims in Washington, D.C. the day prior, and that the standoff only transpired because they were "forced to defend [themselves] from an unprovoked attack by police officers". It was also argued that Gilroy may have been killed by a ricocheting police bullet in a friendly fire mishap, not by deliberate fire from the perpetrators.

On June 21, 1974, a jury consisting of ten white jurors and two black jurors, which was cautioned by the judge "not to be influenced by the defendants' 'religion, race or politics'", found the four defendants guilty of 41 counts, including assault, robbery, and kidnapping. Raheem was convicted for Gilroy's murder. The New York Times reported "the only not-guilty verdicts involved two counts of attempted murder growing out of the wounding of two policemen, a charge of first-degree assault on one of the policemen, and one of the seven counts of illegal possession of weapons", the final charge only being dropped due to an incorrect description by a typist during the indictment.

In 1998, the New York State Division of Parole released Almussadig. The public was not made aware he had been released until he died in 2003.

In 2008, Raheem expressed his regrets for the events of the incident, stating in a parole hearing, "I wish there was some way I could go back to the moment I decided to enter the store ... I'm not an animal. I understand the pain I caused." In 2010, Raheem was released on parole from the Eastern Correctional Facility in Napanoch, New York. He is currently a social worker campaigning for restorative justice.

Rahman was released in 2019.

In October 2020, Abdullah died of a stroke he suffered at his 14th parole hearing, at 71 years old, after having served more than 40 years in prison.

=== Legacy ===
In the immediate aftermath, the NYPD was somewhat divided on how the incident was handled. Officers at the 90th Precinct, where Gilroy had been assigned, were angry that the perpetrators were apprehended alive, with one officer interviewed by The New York Times suggesting they should have used "hand grenades and bazookas" instead of negotiations after Gilroy was killed. However, Robert M. McKiernan, president of the Police Benevolent Association of the City of New York, reported the majority of the NYPD was otherwise accepting of how the standoff was handled and described the response from the 90th Precinct as "a very understandable personal reaction", though he also felt the perpetrators should have received the death penalty. Gilroy's funeral was held at 9:30 am on January 23 at St. Cecilia's Roman Catholic Church in Greenpoint, and he was buried at First Calvary Cemetery in Long Island City.

The NYPD's handling of the standoff was a turning point in American law enforcement's approach to hostage situations. Instead of brute force, police used psychology, firearm discipline, and patience to end the siege. These were techniques that were then codified in the NYPD's Hostage Negotiation Team and training program, both established later in 1973, using the tactics from the standoff as guiding principles. In retrospect, an NYPD captain described the incident as "the birthplace of hostage negotiation".

The 2022 documentary Hold Your Fire by Stefan Forbes recounts the events of the incident and highlights the NYPD's hostage negotiation strategies.

As of 2022, the former site of John and Al's at 927 Broadway is Enrique's Unisex Salon.

== See also ==
- 1977 Washington, D.C., attack and hostage taking
- Hamaas Abdul Khaalis
- Wallace Fard Muhammad
- Zebra murders
