= 7700 16th Street NW =

7700 16th Street NW Washington, D.C.
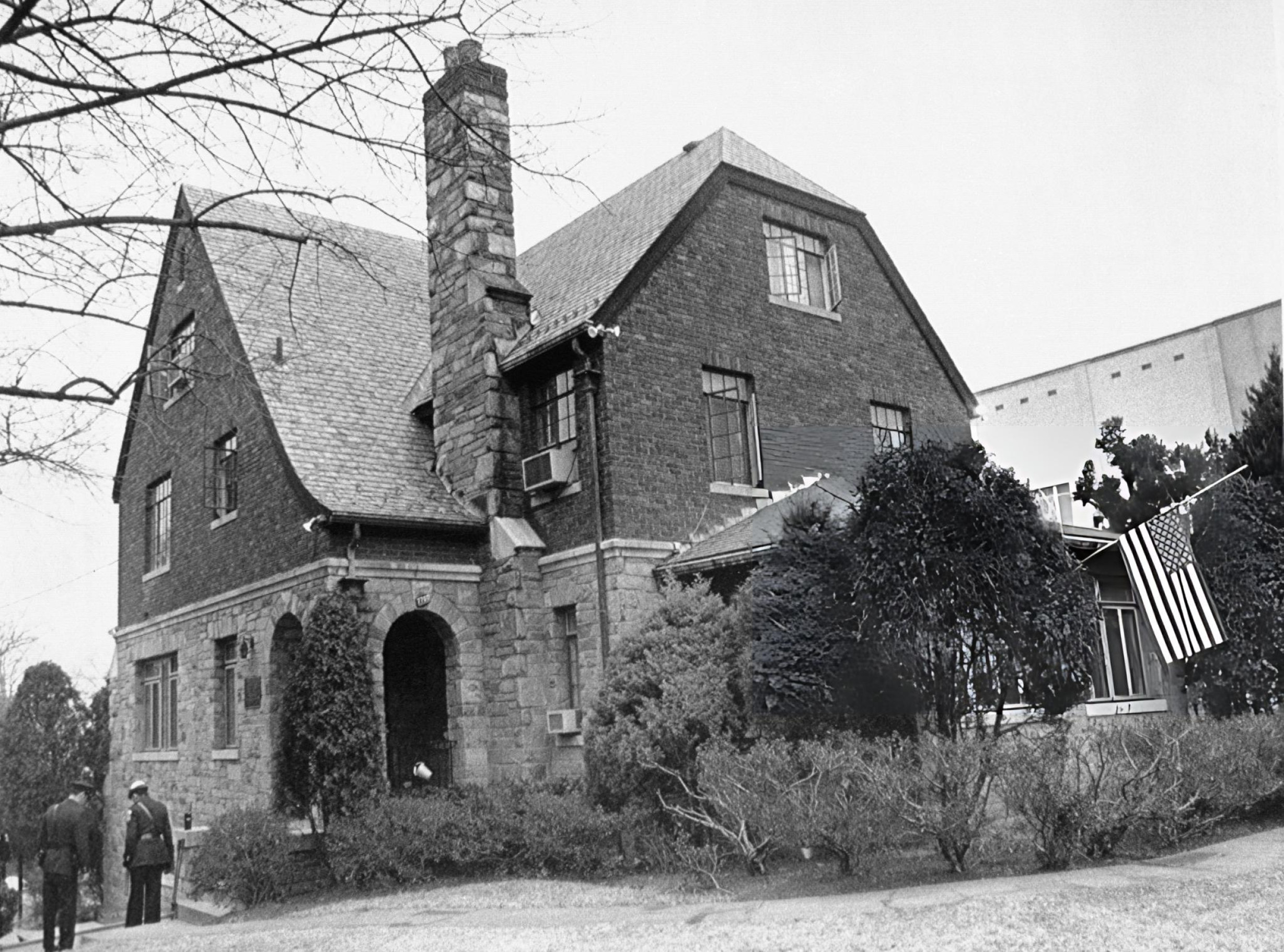
- The house in 1973

- Location within the District of Columbia

General information
- Type: House
- Architectural style: Tudor
- Location: Washington, D.C.
- Coordinates: D.C. 38°59′00″N 77°02′11″W
- Completed: 1936

7700 16th Street NW, a private house in the Shepherd Park neighborhood of Washington, D.C., is the former home of the Hanafi Madh-Hab Center.

In 1973 this house was the scene of the massacre of 7 Hanafi Muslims by members of the Nation of Islam. It was the largest murder that had ever been committed in Washington, D.C.

The brick home continued to be the headquarters of the Hanafi group, and during the 1977 Washington, D.C. attack and hostage taking spokesman Abdul Azziz (35), son-in-law of the group's leader Hanafi Hamaas Abdul Khaalis, stood on the lawn and told journalists that, "Heads will be chopped off, a killing room will be set up at B'nai B'rith and heads will be thrown out of windows," unless all demands being made by armed hostage takers at a downtown office building were met.

A plaque on the building in the 1970s read: Hanafi Madh-Hab Center.

== History of the house ==
Until 1969, this "Tudor mansion" was the home of Thomas A. and Edith B. Cannon, founders of the Washington, D.C. "landmark" Cannon Steakhouse.

The three-story "plush" residence was purchased in 1971 by Kareem Abdul-Jabbar for $78,000, who donated it for use as the headquarters of the Hanafi Madh-Hab in November 1972. Many years later, Kareem Abdul-Jabbar recalled that in the summer of 1970, when he was a rookie with the Milwaukee Bucks still known by his birth name, Lew Alcindor, and was new to Islam, Khaalis had expressed an interest in establishing a Hanafi community in Washington. Jabbar located the "three story" house "in an interracial section of Washington; its price was $80,000. I put up the down payment and opened the building to the community. It was a mosque, home, community center, and everybody used it."

The property was listed as the Hanafi American Mussulman's Rifle and Pistol Club. Jabbar and his wife Habiba were married by Khaalis at the Hanafi Center, and bought a handsome Tudor-style home a few blocks away where they lived; they continued to have close ties with the center in that period. During the period when it was Hanafi headquarters, 30 people lived in this single-family house.

The 2015 Ward 4 Heritage guide states the group of homes of which this house forms part, were "impressive homes and subdivisions along 16th Street now inhabited by upper and middle income black professional families – doctors, judges, attorneys, educators, politicians – (that) became known as Washington's 'Gold Coast.' Together with the "Platinum Coast", the communities of North Portal Estates and Colonial Village, this area of the ward was characterized by some as the 'bastion of black bourgeoisie.'"

Newsday described the Shepherd Park neighborhood where the house is located as "upper-middle class and largely black". The Washington Post described the neighborhood at the time of the murders as an area where "houses sit back from the sidewalk, good-sized solid houses of brick and stone, with enough lawn for a lengthy bout with a mower. There are built-in greenhouses, curving stairways, columns...." an area where "Jews, white Christians and blacks" lived side by side in a neighborhood that "has made something of a career of preserving religious and racial calm". The Hanafi Madh-Hab house is situated next door to a large Orthodox synagogue, Ohev Sholom - The National Synagogue, and across 16th Street from Congregation Tifereth Israel.

== 1973 killings ==
The 1973 Hanafi Muslim massacre, an attack on the Hanafi Muslim community took place in this house. Two adults and a child were shot to death, 4 other children were drowned whose ages ranged from 9 days to 10 years old. Two others were severely injured. Four men from the Nation of Islam Mosque No. 12 were accused of the crime.

The University of Maryland's Global Terrorism Database has a listing for the residence's 1973 killings.

=== Impact ===
After the 1973 murders, "The azaleas were cut down and cleared away. Hedges, shrubbery, anything that might hide an intruder - were leveled until a bare expanse of gravel had replaced the garden. The windows were barred; a spotlight shone on the front steps. And Hanafi guards, armed with machetes and long Japanese swords, began a night-and-day vigil outside the Khaalis house. Every time a neighbor passed the Hanafi house the guards were there, pacing, walking steadily down the gravel field and back again. In winter they put on overcoats and warm hats and kept pacing. It made many neighbors uneasy."

Newsday described the conversion of the "large brick and fieldstone Tudor house" into a "fortress;" basement windows had been bricked over and iron bars sealed other windows. Khaalis's son-in-law, Abdul Aziz, boasted about the explosives inside to a reporter, claiming that "If people want to storm this house, that's it for the house." Aziz asserted that "This is a Holy War in the sense that Allah tells you through the Koran... it seeks vengeance."

== 1977 hostage crisis ==
Khaalis' goal in attacking and taking hostages at Washington, D.C.'s John A. Wilson City Hall, the national B'nai B'rith headquarters, and the Islamic Center of Washington was to force the federal government to turn custody of the five black Muslims convicted in the 1973 murders at 7700 16th St. over to him for purposes of exacting revenge. He had been "stockpiling" weapons in the house on 16th street as he planned the attack.

During the 1977 Washington hostage taking, The Washington Post described the building as "an armed camp" and wrote that "around the clock, at least one sentry armed with what appeared from the street to be a rifle, paced back and forth in front of half a dozen tall flagpoles". People also reported "machete practice sessions on the lawn".

Members of the sect gave interviews from this house during the hostage taking. Amina Khaalis, a survivor of the 1973 massacre and daughter of sect leader Khaalis, said in a telephone interview that, "We obey the laws of the country. As long as it doesn't contradict with our Muslim law. Muslim law comes first." And, "we're ready to fight to the death also, in this house," she said. "And if it means us fighting to the death also, so be it. Babies and all." Her husband Abdul Aziz, who walked out onto the lawn to speak with the press, said, "Allah tells you that by the way of the Holy Koran, when you are persecuted, you retaliable . . . It's a war against . . . the enemies of Islam."

The militant Jewish Defense League threatened to hold a demonstration at the house during the hostage crisis. Khadyja Khaalis, wife of the sect leader, held a press conference on the steps of the house after the hostages were released, in which she declared that "We Hanafi Mussulmans throughout America say to the Zionist Jew-controlled J.D.L. and all Zionist Jews and their allies that they will write their own epitaph in self-destruction and the blood of their people, as we fear Allah, nothing else. We, the Hanafi Mussulmans, sincerely warn all Zionist Jews and their allies that we are not alone and not to be misguided by what they think they see."

=== Impact ===
Neighbors in the upscale, politically liberal, racially mixed neighborhood, which had been protective of the sect living in the house on 16th Street in the wake of the 1973 murders, responded to the group's 1977 armed attack, murders and hostage taking by "discussing ways to rid the (neighborhood) of the group of conservative, Orthodox Moslems," according to The New York Times.

== See also ==
- Sixteenth Street Historic District
