= 1977 Washington, D.C., attack and hostage taking =

1977 siege

1977 Hanafi siege
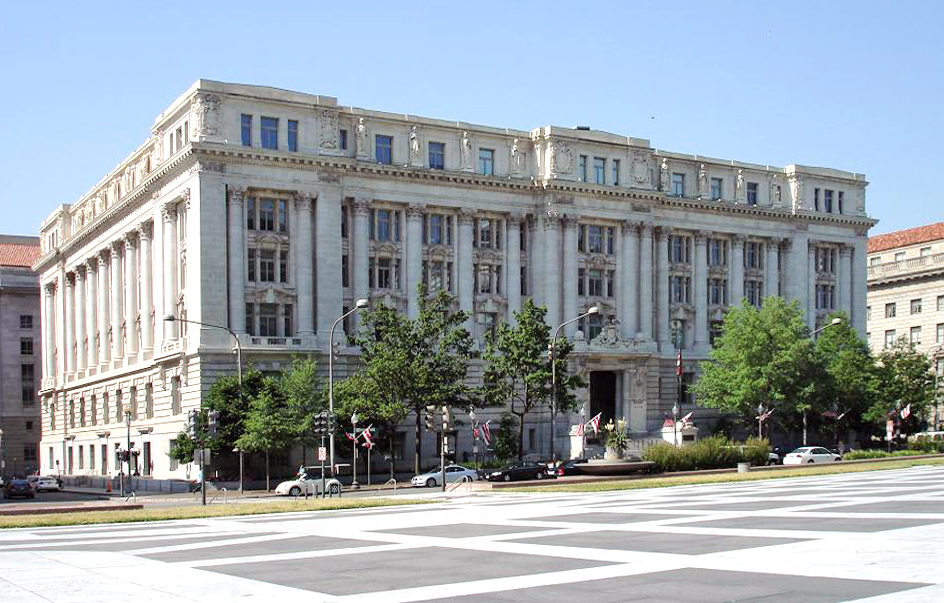
- The District Building, now called the John A. Wilson Building, where much of the violence took place.
- Location: 38°53′42″N 77°01′53″W; Washington, D.C.
- Date: March 9–11, 1977 (3 days)
- Target: The perpetrators of the 1973 Hanafi Muslim massacre and Malcolm X's killing
- Attack type: Siege, hostage taking, shooting, arson, attempted bombing, shootout
- Deaths: 2 (one journalist, one police officer)
- Injuries: 3 (all bystanders)
- Perpetrators: Hamaas Abdul Khaalis and 12 associated gunmen

The 1977 Hanafi Siege was a terrorist attack, hostage-taking, and standoff in Washington, D.C., lasting from March 9 to March 11, 1977. Three buildings (the District Building, B'nai B'rith headquarters, and Islamic Center of Washington) were seized by twelve Hanafi Movement gunmen, who took 149 hostages. During the initial attack and takeover of the buildings, the assailants killed a journalist and mortally wounded a police officer; three others, including a city councilor, were injured. After a 39-hour standoff, the gunmen surrendered and all remaining hostages were released.

The gunmen were led by Hamaas Abdul Khaalis, who wanted to bring attention to the murder of his family in 1973. They had several demands, including that the government hand over the killers of Khaalis' family and Malcolm X to them, as well as that the premiere of Mohammad, Messenger of God be canceled, and the film destroyed, because they considered it sacrilegious.

Time magazine noted:

That the toll was not higher was in part a tribute to the primary tactic U.S. law enforcement officials are now using to thwart terrorists—patience. But most of all, perhaps, it was due to the courageous intervention of three Muslim ambassadors, Egypt's Ashraf Ghorbal, Pakistan's Sahabzada Yaqub-Khan and Iran's Ardeshir Zahedi.

== Background ==
The leader of the attack was Hamaas Abdul Khaalis, a former national secretary of the Nation of Islam. Khaalis was born Ernest McGhee in Indiana in 1921. Discharged from the U.S. Army on grounds of mental instability, he worked as a jazz drummer in New York City before converting to Islam and changing his name to Hamaas Khaalis. He became prominent in the ministries and schools of the Nation of Islam and was appointed its national secretary in the early 1950s.

Khaalis split with the Nation of Islam in 1958 to found a rival Islamic organization, the Hanafi Movement. In 1968, he was arrested for attempted extortion but released on grounds of mental illness. The same year, militant students at Howard University formed a group called the Kokayi family. When that was disbanded, many of its members became members of Hamaas' Hanafi American Mussulman's Rifle and Pistol Club, which was given a group membership charter by the National Rifle Association.

In 1972, Hamaas published an open letter attacking the leadership and beliefs of the Nation of Islam. A year later, five men broke into Khaalis' Washington, D.C., home and murdered five of his children, his nine-day-old grandson and another man. The men were associated with the Nation of Islam, and the government did not hold the Nation of Islam accountable to Khalis' satisfaction. The high-profile murder trial was delayed for several years. Khaalis's daughter, the only survivor of the massacre, had sustained brain damage and suffered mental breakdowns when thinking about the murders. Khaalis and his family had urged prosecutors to allow her to submit a sworn statement. Despite this, prosecutors persuaded her to testify in court. When the trial began in fall of 1976, she became incoherent under cross-examination and fled the courtroom. The judge wrote a warrant for her arrest, then eventually declared a mistrial.

== Building takeovers ==
On March 9, 1977, seven members of Khaalis' group burst into the headquarters of B'nai B'rith at 1640 Rhode Island Ave N.W. in downtown Washington, 5 miles (8 kilometers) south of Khaalis' headquarters at 7700 16th Street NW, and took over 100 hostages. Less than an hour later, three men entered the Islamic Center of Washington, and took eleven hostages. At 2:20 pm, two Hanafis entered the District Building, three blocks from the White House. They went to the fifth floor looking for important people to take hostage.

When an elevator opened, the hostage-takers thought they were under attack and fired, killing Maurice Williams, a reporter for WHUR-FM radio, and mortally wounding D.C. Protective Services Division Police Officer Mack Cantrell, who died in the hospital a few days later of a heart attack. Then-councilman and future four-term D.C. mayor Marion Barry walked into the hallway after hearing a commotion and was struck by a ricocheting shotgun pellet, which lodged just above his heart. Barry was later extracted from the building and rushed to a hospital. Two others were injured.

Over the course of the siege, Khaalis "denounced the Jewish judge who had presided at the trial of his family's killers", repeatedly alleging that "the Jews control the courts and the press".

== Demands ==
Khaalis and the Hanafis wanted those convicted for the 1973 murders, as well as those convicted for killing Malcolm X, handed over to their custody, presumably for execution. They also wanted to receive visits from Muslim leader Warith Deen Mohammed and champion boxer Muhammad Ali, long an active Nation of Islam supporter. Khaalis also demanded that he be refunded $750 in legal fees caused by a contempt of court citation issued in response to shouting at one of the defendants on trial for murdering his family members.

Time noted: "He also wanted the recently released film Mohammad, Messenger of God, to be banned on the grounds that it is sacrilegious. Khaalis' concern over the film was thought to have triggered the attack." He made this determination about the sacrilegious nature of the film based on the mistaken impression that Mohammad was a character seen or heard in the film, which is not the case. The main characters are relatives whose portrayal is not forbidden by religious tradition. The kidnappers made some of their demands on air by calling the then-popular broadcast journalist Max Robinson.

== Negotiations and resolution ==
L. Douglas Heck and Rudy Giuliani had organized a team within the United States Department of Justice aimed at "combating terrorism". Although they claimed that DC police would handle the attacks, they soon brought in two intelligence operatives, Steve Pieczenik and Robert Blum.

When Khaalis was informed that people were worried about the fate of the hostages, Khaalis said, "Nobody showed any concern when my family was killed several years earlier." He told a reporter:

Get on the phone and call President Carter and some of those senators that never sent a call, a condolence message. Do you not realize when my family was wiped out [no] one said one word? Not one. Not even a preacher. Not even a minister. Not even a spiritual advisor. Not even a city council member. So, I'm very glad you're worried now. When they wiped out my family, I didn't hear about your sympathy and emotions. I got a letter the other day from my brother telling me how the brother was swaggering around in jail, the killer of Malcolm, walking around with guards protecting him. Well tell him it's over. Tell him it's payday.

The money from the contempt of court citation was returned and the movie premiere of The Message was cancelled, as per their request. However, the convicted killers of his family and Malcolm X were not delivered.

On the evening of the following day, after a number of phone calls, the three ambassadors and some Washington, D.C., officials—including MPDC commander Joseph O'Brien, who had investigated the murder of Khaalis' children and was trusted by Khaalis—met with the Hanafis. Khaalis prayed and had a vision of his mentor, a Bengali mystic named Tasibur Uddein Rahman who had died ten years prior. He received guidance from the vision and proceeded to the negotiations. The ambassadors of Pakistan, Iran, and Egypt read the Quran with Khaalis to appeal to his conscience. Finally, Khaalis and the others involved in the hostage taking at the two sites where no one was killed were allowed to be charged and then freed on their own recognizance. All 12 were later tried and convicted, with Khaalis receiving a sentence of 21 to 120 years for his role.

== Aftermath ==
Khaalis died at the Federal Correctional Complex Prison in Butner, North Carolina, on November 13, 2003. Marion Barry recovered from his wounds and was later elected mayor. In 2007, the fifth floor press room at the Wilson Building was named for the slain reporter, Maurice Williams. Abdul Muzikir, who shot and killed Williams, was sentenced to 70 years in prison and released in 2022.

== In popular culture ==
John W. King wrote about the Hanafi siege in his book, The Breeding of Contempt. The book chronicles the siege and his family's becoming the first African American family in the Federal Witness Protection Program after the massacre of the Khaalis family.

The siege is mentioned in Joni Mitchell's song "Otis And Marlena" from her 1977 album Don Juan's Reckless Daughter. In the song, the title characters travel "for sun and fun / While Muslims stick up Washington".

The Jonathan Leaf play The Caterers, which was produced Off Broadway in 2005, portrayed a modern-day version of the siege.

Filmmaker David Simon reused an anecdote from the siege in his 2020 HBO drama The Plot Against America. Simon's father, Bernard Simon, was taken hostage in 1977 while serving as public relations director for B'nai B'rith. Tasked with finding food, he noticed that the bologna sandwiches provided by a nearby hotel were not kosher and would therefore be unacceptable to a number of the Jewish hostages. According to David Simon, his father joked, "Mayonnaise on white bread? I think they're trying to kill us."

University of Richmond associate professor of journalism Shahan Mufti was awarded the 2020 J. Anthony Lukas Work-In-Progress Award for his manuscript of American Caliph, an account of the 1977 siege. The book was published in November 2022 by Farrar, Straus and Giroux.

In the 2024 Book, Owning Up, a collection of novellas set in Washington, DC, author George Pelecanos uses the Hanafi house murders of 1973 and siege of 1977 as a backdrop in the fourth novella that shares the title with the book. The history of the house is known to neighbors and is the subject of conversations between the protagonist and his parents on family car rides. The protagonist is a Christian high school student who is dating a Jewish girl. Later, the girl's father is taken hostage during the siege.

== See also ==
External videos
- Q&A interview with Shahan Mufti on American Caliph, December 18, 2022, C-SPAN

- 1973 Brooklyn hostage crisis – Hostage-taking and standoff in Brooklyn, New York
- 2025 killing of Israeli Embassy in Washington, D.C. workers
- Black Mafia – African-American organized crime syndicate
- List of attacks on Jewish institutions in the United States
- List of incidents of political violence in Washington, D.C.
- List of journalists killed in the United States
- Major Coxson – American drug kingpin (1930–1973)
- Zebra murders – Series of racially motivated murders in San Francisco, California
