= Hold Your Fire (film) =

2021 American documentary by Stefan Forbes

- Theatrical release poster
- Directed by: Stefan Forbes
- Written by: Stefan Forbes
- Produced by: Tia Wou; Fab 5 Freddy; Amir Soltani; Stefan Forbes
- Cinematography: Stefan Forbes
- Edited by: Stefan Forbes
- Music by: Jonathan Sanford
- Production company: InterPositive Media
- Distributed by: IFC Films
- Release dates: September 10, 2021 (TIFF); May 20, 2022
- Country: United States
- Language: English
- Box office: $5,614

Hold Your Fire is a 2021 American documentary film written, directed, shot, edited, and produced by Stefan Forbes. It is about the 1973 Brooklyn hostage crisis, a 47-hour standoff in New York City in January 1973 that saw one of the first successful uses of crisis negotiation by American law enforcement. The film premiered at the Toronto International Film Festival on September 10, 2021, and was theatrically released on May 20, 2022 by IFC Films.

== Premise ==
Hold Your Fire follows the events of a hostage crisis that lasted from January 19 to January 21, 1973, which occurred after four young African American Sunni Muslims shot a police officer and took a dozen hostages while attempting to rob a sporting goods store in the Bushwick, and Bedford–Stuyvesant neighborhoods of Brooklyn. The documentary specifically centers around the negotiation strategies used by the New York City Police Department, spearheaded by police psychologist Harvey Schlossberg, to ensure the safe release of the hostages and the suspects' surrender, a departure from the typical aggressive hostage rescue tactics used by American police at the time.

== Reception ==
=== Box office ===
In the United States and Canada, the film earned $3,041 from fourteen theaters in its opening weekend, and $612 from eight theaters in its second weekend.

=== Critical response ===
Manohla Dargis, writing for The New York Times, called the film "formally audacious".

Allan Hunter of ScreenDaily.com wrote: "Hold Your Fire has all the ingredients of a Sidney Lumet film… as tense as any thriller from that period, the involving human stories and lasting impact of the events makes for an absorbing, gripping film with theatrical potential."

Frank Scheck of The Hollywood Reporter praised it as a "fast-paced, suspenseful real-life thriller featuring an array of fascinating characters".

Tambay Obenson of IndieWire give it a grade A, describing it as "a searing look into a little-known moment in history with profound repercussions for how we understand policing today".

=== Awards ===
Hold Your Fire won the 2020 Library Of Congress Better Angels Grand Prize for historical films and the Metropolis Grand Jury Prize at the 2021 Doc NYC Film Festival. It was also NPR's Documentary of the Week in November 2021.
