= Harvey Schlossberg =

American police psychologist (1936–2021)

- Born: January 27, 1936; Manhattan, New York, U.S.
- Died: May 21, 2021 (aged 85); Brooklyn, New York, U.S.
- Education: Brooklyn College; Long Island University; Yeshiva University
- Occupation: Police psychologist
- Known for: Formulating police tactics in hostage situations
- Spouses: Cynthia Marks (divorced): Antoinette Collarini
- Children: 5

Harvey Schlossberg (January 27, 1936 – May 21, 2021) was a New York City Police Department (NYPD) officer, Freudian psychoanalyst, and the founder of modern crisis negotiation. He founded the Psychological Services Department in the NYPD, where he pioneered treatment for violence-prone police. In the Handbook of Police Psychology, Schlossberg was called a "father of modern police psychology" for his role in changing the tactics police employed in hostage situations.

== Early life ==
Schlossberg was born in Manhattan on January 27, 1936. His father, Harry, worked as a mechanic; his mother, Sally (Frankel), was a housewife. His family was Jewish, and his grandparents immigrated to the United States from Eastern Europe. He attended Eastern District High School in Brooklyn, before studying chemistry at Brooklyn College. After graduating with a bachelor's degree in 1958, Schlossberg joined the NYPD to fund his postgraduate studies. He went on to obtain a master's degree in psychology from Long Island University, and was awarded a doctorate in clinical psychology from the Graduate School of Arts and Sciences at Yeshiva University in 1971.

== Career ==
=== NYPD ===
Schlossberg first worked as a traffic officer in the accident investigation unit. He was later moved to the Medical Bureau after commissioner Patrick V. Murphy learned that he had a doctorate in psychology. There, he performed emotional testing to assess the well-being of prospective and current colleagues in the NYPD, and was made director of psychological services in 1974. He helped resolve the 1973 Brooklyn hostage crisis, coined the term Stockholm syndrome, and helped catch serial killer David Berkowitz. The NYPD Hostage Negotiation Team was the brainchild of NYPD chief Simon Eisdorfer, with Schlossberg responsible for formulating the team’s strategy. He advocated containing a hostage situation to a restricted area, with police starting negotiations, keeping up communications with the hostage-takers, and gaining their trust in the hopes that they would change course and free their captives. He trained over 70,000 crisis negotiators globally, and his theories were eventually adopted by the Federal Bureau of Investigation. Schlossberg was credited with helping to save over 40,000 lives globally with his tactics.

==== 1973 hostage-taking ====
During the 1973 Brooklyn hostage crisis, the longest in NYPD history, twelve hostages were taken by four gunmen, who vowed to fight to the death. Schlossberg spent 14 hours assessing their psychology and advising NYPD officials on what to do next. He called the hostage-takers' bluff when they requested a doctor and food, observing at the time how "if you’re worried about food, you don’t want to die." The siege ultimately ended without any further deaths when the gunmen surrendered.

Schlossberg authored his memoir Psychologist With A Gun (1974) with Lucy Freeman. He was featured in the documentary film Hold Your Fire covering the 1973 siege. The documentary premiered at the 2021 Toronto International Film Festival, won the Metropolis Award at Doc NYC, and was selected by Dr. Carla Hayden as the Grand Prize Winner of the Library of Congress Lavine/Ken Burns Prize for Film in October 2020.

=== Post-NYPD ===
After leaving the NYPD in 1978, Schlossberg served as chief psychologist for the Rye Police Department from 1988 to 1994, as well as for the Port Authority of New York and New Jersey from 1990 to 1999. He also went into academia, teaching at the John Jay College of Criminal Justice from 1974 to 1982. He subsequently taught as an associate professor at St. John's University for 27 years. During his later years, he resided in Forest Hills, Queens, where he also kept a private practice and hung a portrait of Sigmund Freud in his office.

== Personal life ==
Schlossberg's first marriage to Cynthia Marks ended in divorce. Together, they had four children: Mark, Alexander, James, and Steven. His second marriage was to Antoinette Collarini Schlossberg, who also taught at St. John's University. They had one child, Anna Elizabeth.

Schlossberg died on May 21, 2021, at a hospital in Brooklyn. He was 85 when he suffered a fatal cardiopulmonary arrest.

== Articles and citations ==
- "Patrolman Puts Psychology Degree to Use", The New York Times, February 20, 1973
- "Police Trying to Out-Psych the Son of Sam Killer", The New York Times, April 26, 1977.
- "Review of Psychologist with a Gun" by Lucy Freeman, Kirkus Reviews.
- "'Crisis' or 'Hostage' Negotiation? The Distinction Between Two Important Terms", FBI Law Enforcement Bulletin, May 3, 2014.
- "Finding the First Mind Hunter", Psychology Today, May 11, 2020.
