= 1858 Congressional brawl =

Fistfight, Washington, D.C.

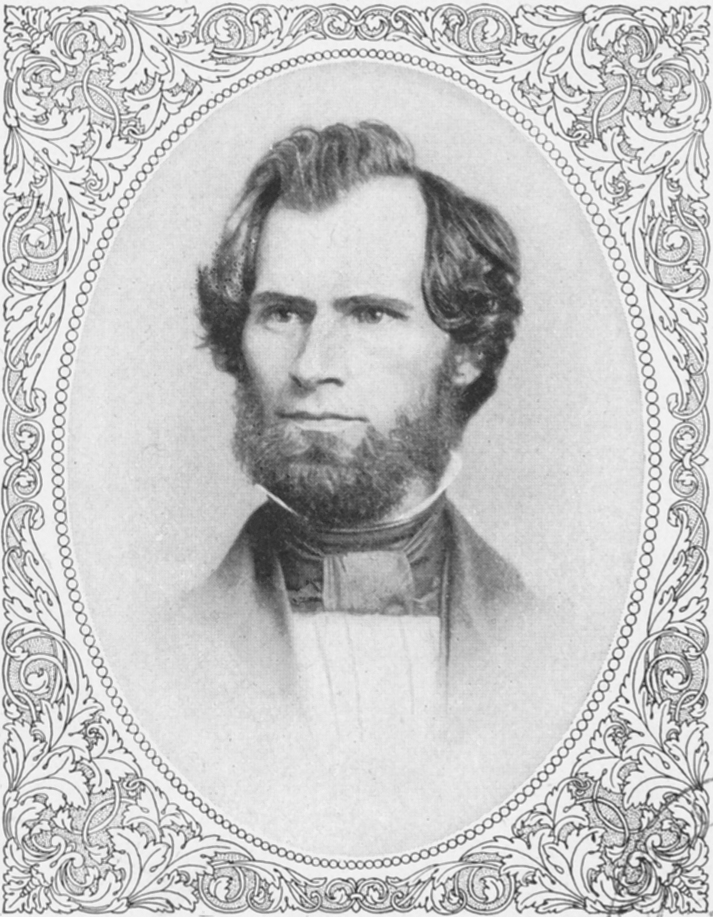
Galusha Grow c. 1859

The 1858 Congressional brawl was a physical fight between 30 to 50 congressmen that took place on the floor of the U.S. House of Representatives at about 2 a.m. on February 6, 1858. The fight, which broke out during the Bloody Kansas debates over slavery, has been described as both an exemplar of the deadly sectional conflict that fueled the forthcoming American Civil War, and a ridiculous interlude in the history of the United States Congress. Southerners dueled when they felt they were being insulted, but as a rule, Northerners did not. However, when things got very hot, to "defend their honor" against Southern aspersions, the Northerners (mostly associated with the new-formed Republican Party) would indeed squabble up. The 1858 brawl was one such case; overall the years 1857 to 1861 were an era of rising violence throughout the country, which would reach its crescendo in the outbreak of the War.

The primary instigators of the brawl were Galusha A. Grow of Pennsylvania and Laurence M. Keitt of South Carolina, both of whom were hard-liners on opposite sides of the debate over slavery. Keitt started it, and the fact that many Southerners were drunk but had been dragged into the building for the late-night vote did not help matters. The ensuing bench-clearing fight was unequivocally over political and sectional, not personal, differences. The fight was also a harbinger of the war to come in that "Unlike previous fights, 'members fought in battalions. They did not go into a corner or a lobby to fight, or entangle themselves as heretofore, between chairs and desks,'" and those "battalions" into which they self-organized were based on regional–political, or to be clear, pro-abolitionist or pro-slavery, allegiances. Most of the actual punching took place in the space in front of the Speaker's desk. The immediately precipitating exchange was Keitt grabbing Grow by the throat and telling him that he was a "black republican puppy" who ought to be taught a lesson. Grow smacked Keitt's hand away and sneered back, "Never mind. I shall occupy such place in this hall as I please, and no negro-driver shall crack his whip over me." This caused the fight to be underway.

According to Yale historian Joanne Freeman:

The most notable aspect of the fight was the mass rescue by Republicans, who had rushed over to Grow with fists flying because they thought that Southerners were staging a group assault. This was Slave Power thinking; it was knee-jerk distrust of Southerners as brutal, domineering, determined to cow Northerners, and on the attack. This distrust was no back-of-the-mind matter of speculation. It was immediate; Republicans jumped into action in seconds.

British traveller A. J. Nicholls described one of the fights as peak physical comedy: "The smallest member of the house, Mr. Washburn, of Maine, attacked the biggest man he could find, and fell upon Mr. Craige, who is a giant in size;— an amusing scene was the result, the dwarf not being able to strike so high as his opponent's knees, and the giant making unavailing efforts to reach down low enough to touch the little one's head."

John "Bowie Knife" Potter of Wisconsin was apparently punching his way through the crowd trying to reach his ally Grow, in company with Cadwallader C. Washburn of Wisconsin (a brother of the aforementioned Maine Washburn), when he hit William Barksdale of Mississippi, who then swung around and decked C. C. Washburn. In response to this, Potter grabbed Barksdale by the hair to hold him still to punch him in the face, but could not get a grip and instead came up holding Barksdale's wig, over which Potter apparently crowed, "I've scalped him!" Barksdale scrambled for his wig and then frantically put it back on his head, backwards. The members assembled cracked up laughing, and parliamentary order was restored.

== See also ==
- List of incidents of political violence in Washington, D.C.

== Sources ==
- Freeman, Joanne B. (2018). The Field of Blood: Violence in Congress and the Road to Civil War. New York: Farrar, Straus and Giroux. ISBN 978-0-374-15477-6. LCCN 2018010176. OCLC 1076509946.
- Gugliotta, Guy (2012). Freedom's Cap: The United States Capitol and the Coming of the Civil War. New York: Hill and Wang. ISBN 978-0-8090-4681-2. LCCN 2011025750. OCLC 709673926.
