= Ashraf Ghorbal =

Egyptian diplomat

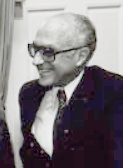
Ashraf Ghorbal, 1982

Ashraf Ghorbal (Alexandria, Egypt May 1925 – 29 November 2005) was an Egyptian diplomat.

== Career ==
Ghorbal began his career in 1949 when he entered the Egyptian diplomatic service as a member of its delegation to the United Nations.

In January 1968, following the severance of diplomatic relations between the US and the Egyptian government, Ghorbal was appointed head of the Egyptian interests section that operated within the Indian Embassy.

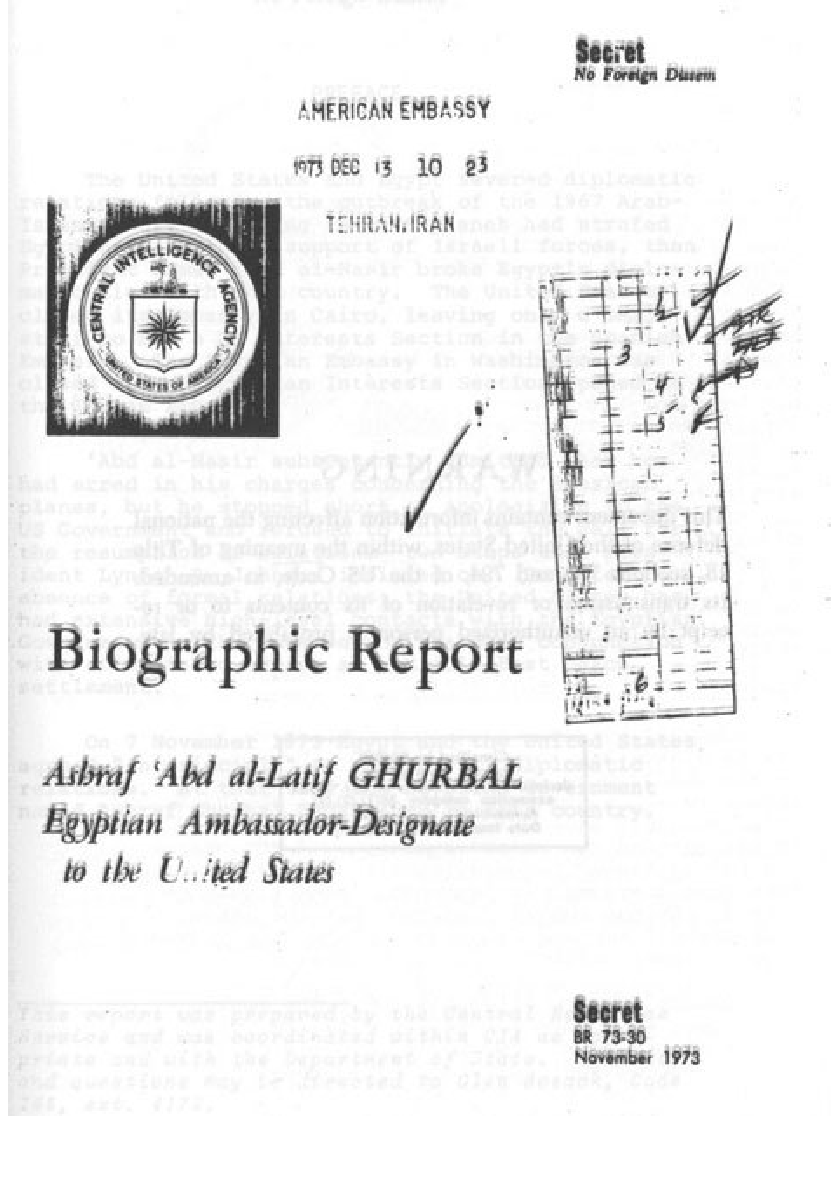
Cover of a secret CIA "Biographic Report" on Ashraf 'Abd al-Latif Ghurbal, dated November 1973

Ghorbal held that position until February 1973, when he was appointed as media adviser to Egyptian President Anwar Sadat. In November 1973 the Egyptian and the US governments decided to reestablish diplomatic relations, and Ghorbal was designated as the new Ambassador, a position he held until 1984. He served as Egypt's ambassador to Washington during the signing of the Camp David Accords between Sadat and U.S. President Jimmy Carter. He played a significant role in the diffusion of the hostage situation during the 1977 Washington, D.C. attack and hostage taking.

== Personal life ==
Ghorbal studied political science at Harvard University, earning his Ph.D. in 1949. He was married to Amal (born 1936) and they had two children.
