= Islamic Center of Washington =

Mosque in Washington, D.C.

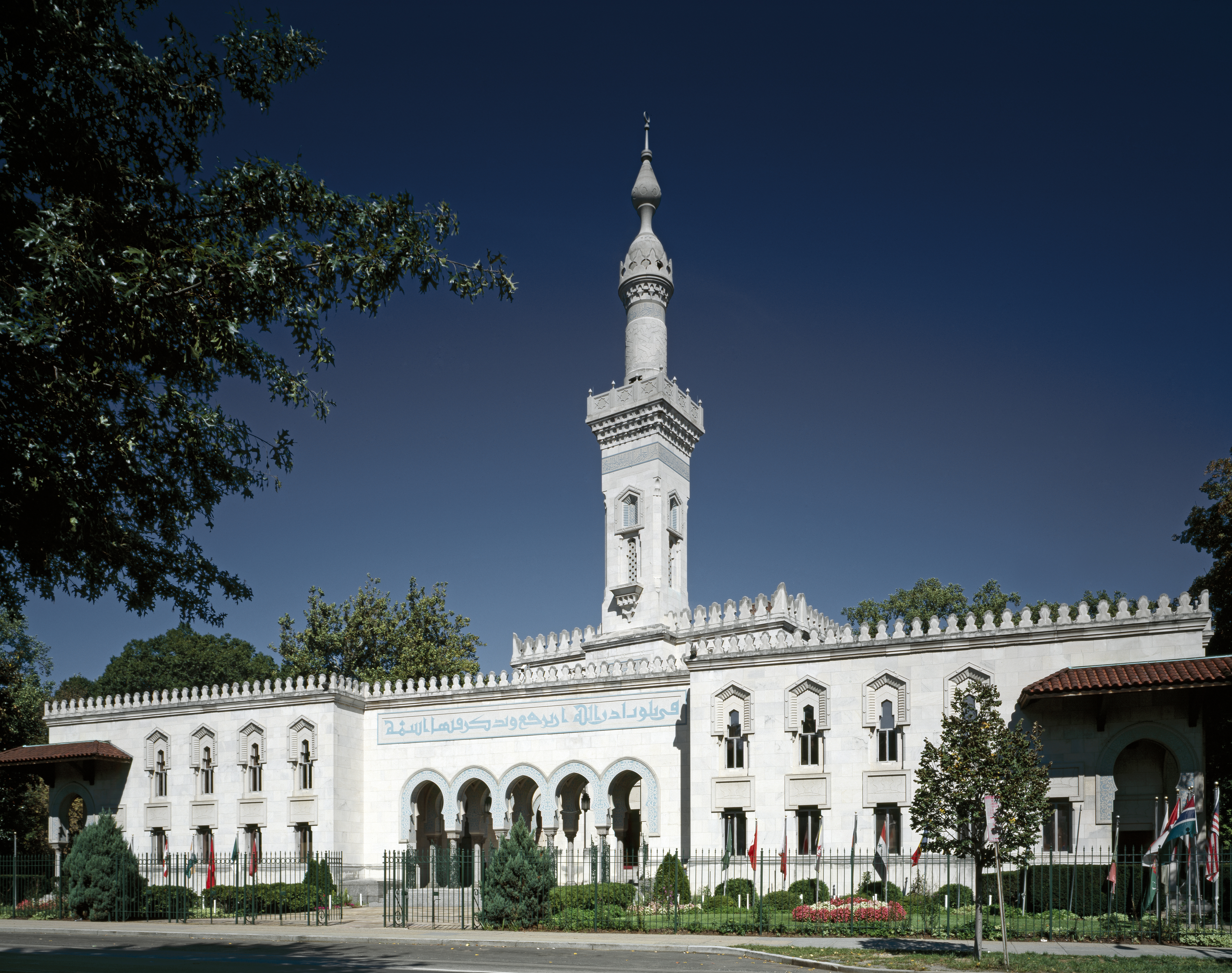

- Location within the United States

Religion
- Affiliation: Islam

Location
- Location: Washington, D.C., U.S.
- Coordinates: 38°55′1.6″N 77°3′24.3″W

Architecture
- Architect: Mario Rossi
- Type: Mosque
- Style: Mameluke Revival
- Completed: 1954

Specifications
- Minaret: 1
- Minaret height: 160 feet (49 m)

Website
- www.theislamiccenter.com

The Islamic Center of Washington is a mosque and Islamic cultural center in Washington, D.C. It is located on Embassy Row on Massachusetts Avenue just east of the bridge over Rock Creek. When it opened in 1957, it was the largest mosque in the Western Hemisphere.

== History ==
=== 20th century ===
In 1948, Egypt appointed Kamil Abdul Rahim as Egyptian ambassador to the United States, succeeding Mahmoud Hassan. The project of building a mosque lay dormant during the war years and was not revived until Rahim assumed his position.

Rahim was appointed president of the mosque foundation and its executive committee. He was instrumental in assembling all of the heads of the accredited emissaries of Muslim countries in the U.S. He made several trips to Saudi Arabia, Kuwait and Muslim countries to solicit funds for the building of the mosque.

Howar (Mohammed Issa Abu Al Hawa, 1879–1982) and other Muslim diplomats helped found and provide early funding to a committee to build a mosque in the U.S. capital. In 1948, Howar, placing a silver dollar on the ground for luck, began work at the site.

The Washington diplomatic community played a leading role in the effort to construct a mosque. Egypt donated a bronze chandelier and sent specialists who wrote Qur'anic verses to adorn the mosque’s walls and ceiling. Tiles came from Turkey along with the experts to install them. Persian rugs came from Iran. Support for the project also came from the American-Muslim community. The site was purchased in 1946 and the cornerstone was laid on January 11, 1949. The building was designed by Italian architect Mario Rossi.

The mosque was completed in 1954 and dedicated by President Dwight Eisenhower on June 28, 1957.

The mosque was one of three buildings taken over in the 1977 Hanafi Siege. Muslim gunmen holding hostages demanded those convicted for the 1973 murder of Hamaas Abdul Khaalis's family to be turned over, as well as that the movie Mohammad, Messenger of God be destroyed, falsely believing that it portrayed the prophet Muhammad.

=== 21st century ===
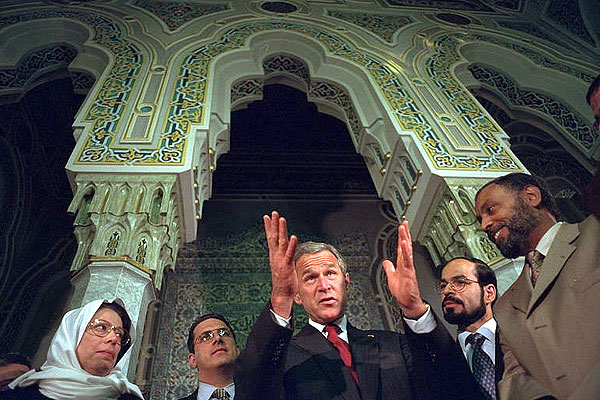
President George W. Bush at the Islamic Center of Washington, D.C.

The mosque has been visited by dignitaries, including several presidents. President George W. Bush visited on September 17, 2001, only days after the September 11 attacks. On national television, Bush quoted from the Qur'an and worked to assure Americans that the vast majority of Muslims are peaceful.

In 2015, a group of Muslim activists, politicians, and writers issued a Declaration of Reform, which announced the founding of the Muslim Reform Movement organization to work against the beliefs of Middle Eastern terror groups. That year, journalist Asra Nomani and others placed the Declaration on the door of the mosque.

The center's board of governors is made up of various ambassadors.

== Facilities ==
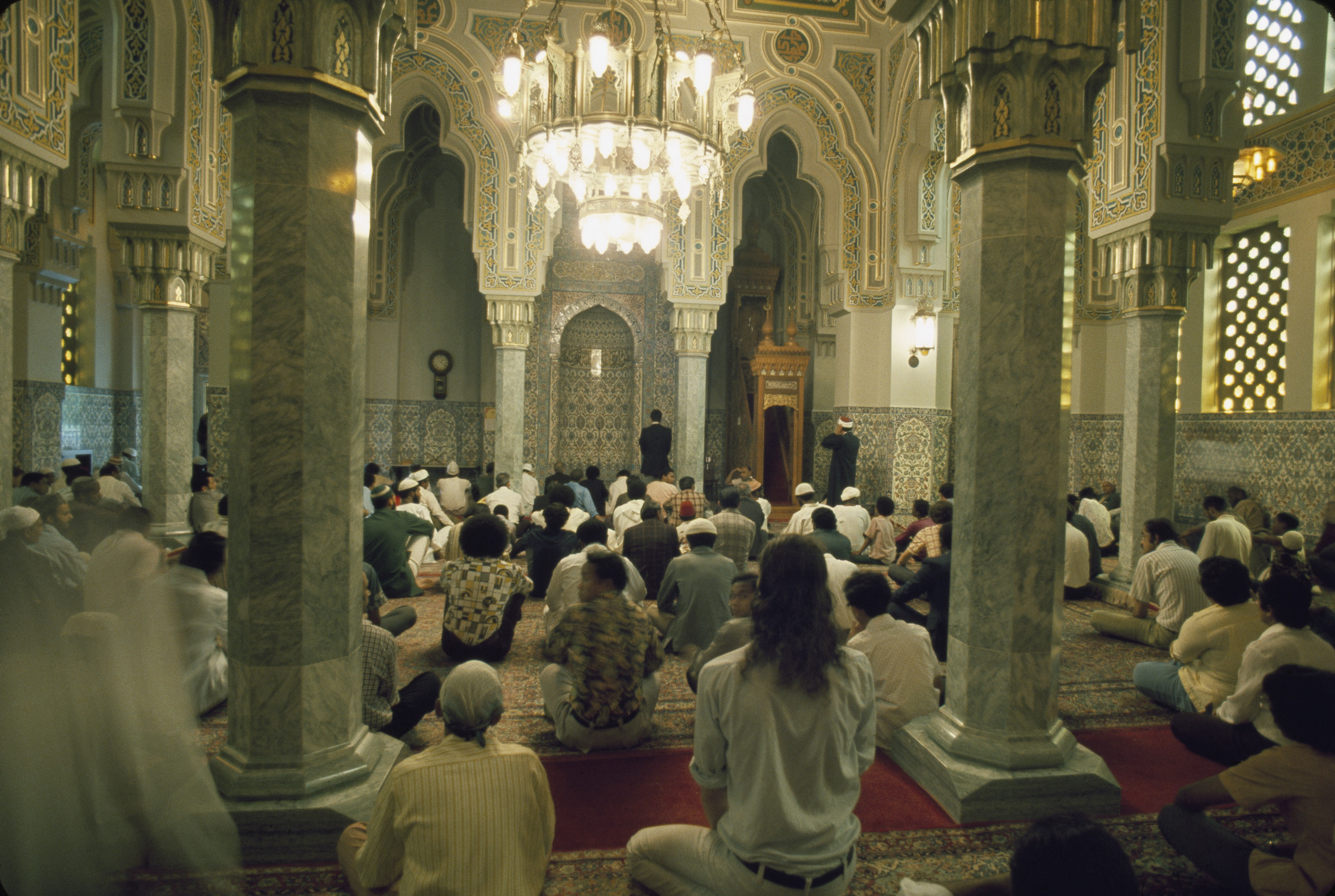
Worshippers at the Islamic Center

In addition to the mosque, the center contains a library and classrooms, where courses on Islam and the Arabic language are taught. Around the building are arrayed the flags of the Islamic nations of the world.
