= 1973 Hanafi Muslim massacre =

Massacre of a Hanafi man's family by members of the Nation of Islam

Hanafi murders
- Location: 38°59′00″N 77°02′11″W; 7700 16th Street NW, Washington, D.C., US
- Date: January 18, 1973
- Target: Home invasion
- Attack type: Mass murder; mass shooting; drowning
- Deaths: 7
- Injuries: 2
- Perpetrator: Black Mafia

The 1973 Hanafi Muslim massacre took place on January 18, 1973. Two men and a boy were shot to death. Four other children ranging in age from nine days to ten years old were drowned. Two others were severely injured. The murders took place at 7700 16th Street NW, a Washington, D.C. house purchased for a group of Hanafi Muslims to use as the "Hanafi American Mussulman's Rifle and Pistol Club". The property was purchased and donated by then Milwaukee Bucks basketball player Kareem Abdul-Jabbar.

The target of the attack was Hamaas Abdul Khaalis, the son-in-law of Reginald Hawkins. Khaalis had written and sent fifty letters calling Nation of Islam leader Elijah Muhammad "guilty of 'fooling and deceiving people – robbing them of their money, and besides that dooming them to Hell.'" The letters were mailed to ministers of all fifty mosques of the Nation of Islam, a sect that Khaalis had infiltrated and in which he had been a leader in the 1950s. The letters were also critical of Wallace D. Fard and urged the ministers to leave the sect.

The massacre was a direct cause of the 1973 Brooklyn hostage crisis that started the following day, when four Sunni Muslims took hostages while seeking to acquire firearms for self-defense in the event they were targeted for a similar attack.

== Background ==
At the time of the murders, Black Muslims were known as the Nation of Islam (NOI), and later changed their name to World Community Islam in the West.

Hamaas Abdul Khaalis was originally a Roman Catholic and Seventh-day Adventist born in Gary, Indiana as Ernest Timothy McGhee. He converted to Sunni Islam and, on the advice of his Islamic teacher, Tasibur Uddein Rahman, infiltrated the Black Muslims. He changed his name to Ernest 2x McGhee and served as principal of the sect's school, and went on to become Elijah Muhammad's national secretary at their Chicago national headquarters from 1954 to 1957. Khaalis said, "Elijah once said that I was next in line to him, that it was me, not Malcolm X."

In 1957 he was demoted or lost influence in a dispute possibly after unsuccessfully trying to convince Muhammad to change the direction of the movement. He moved to New York City where he ran the Hanafi Madh-hab center in Harlem under his Sunni Muslim name Hamaas Abdul Khaalis. In New York, he continued trying to convince members to defect from Muhammad. In 1970, Khaalis converted basketball star Kareem Abdul-Jabbar, who was formerly known as Lew Alcindor. In 1971 Jabbar donated a $78,000 mansion for Khaalis' headquarters in Washington, D.C.

Police believed the continued efforts to convert people in New York to be a reason for the growing conflict between Sunni Muslims and Black Muslims, and may have contributed to the murders. Khaalis spoke of Malcolm X, "When Malcolm was killed I was teaching him the Sunni way," and "He used to come to my house on Long Island and we would sit in his car for hours. He would meet me after he left the temple. Never in public because he knew they were after him. He was saying the wrong things."

== Massacre ==
On January 12, 1973, several Black Mafia affiliates traveled to Washington, D.C and scouted the home. Then on January 17, 1973, Ronald Harvey, John Clark, James "Bubbles" Price, John Griffin, Theodore Moody, William Christian, and Jerome Sinclair traveled in two vehicles from Philadelphia to Washington, D.C.

One of the men telephoned and arranged to come to the residence to purchase literature about the Hanafi. Two of them came to purchase it. One man gave Khaalis' son, Daud, a bill, and Daud left the room to get change. Upon returning he was told, "This is a stick up." The two men then let five or six additional people into the residence.

Daud was taken to the third floor and shot dead. Abdu Nur was shot in a bedroom. Bibi Khaalis, one of Hamaas' wives, was forced to watch them drown two of the children in an upstairs bathtub, then was taken to the basement and forced to watch them drown her nine-day-old granddaughter in a sink. Then Bibi was bound, gagged, and shot eight times.

Amina, Khaalis' daughter, was put in a closet and shot three times. She was told, "You know your father wrote those letters, don't you? Don't you know he can't do anything like that?" She was shot two more times, and then the gun jammed. Amina survived.

Seven Philadelphia Black Muslims were charged for the crime.

Kareem Abdul-Jabbar was a pallbearer at the funeral for Khaalis' children.

== Trials ==
James Price, 23, Jerome Sinclair, 22, also known as Jerome 5X; John W. Griffin, 28, also known as Omar Jamal; John W. Clark, 31; Thomas Moody, 20; and William Christian, 29, were indicted. They all had extensive police records and, with the exception of Christian, they all had served prison sentences at Holmesburg Prison.

Of the six defendants, one was acquitted when a key witness, Price, an unindicted co-conspirator, refused to testify. Price was not happy with the lifestyle afforded as a protected witness. Price also thought that if he could get out from the witness protection program he could reintegrate with his black Muslim brothers and they would stop threatening violence against him. Then Minister Louis Farrakhan on behalf of Elijah Muhammad, aired a threat during his radio broadcast:

Let this be a warning to the opponents of Muhammad. Let this be a warning to those of you who would be used as an instrument of a wicked government against our rise. Be careful, because when the government is tired of using you, they're going to dump you back into the laps of your people. And although Elijah Muhammad is a merciful man and will say, "Come in," and forgive you, yet in the ranks of black people today there are younger men and women rising up who have no forgiveness in them for traitors and stool pigeons. And they will execute you as soon as your identity is known. Be careful because nothing shall prevent the rise of the messiah, The Nation of Islam, and the black man the world over.

This broadcast led Price to refuse to testify. He was later murdered in Holmesburg prison, where he was housed with other Black Muslims.

Another defendant, John Griffin, was granted a retrial after the jury had found him guilty, which ended in a mistrial because Amina Khaalis, a survivor of the massacre and the daughter of the Hanafi leader, refused to be cross-examined as she had "suffered irreparable psychological trauma" and it was thought that it was "highly probable" that she would suffer psychiatric injury if she were to testify again about the murders.

One of the men indicted, Ronald Harvey, was also indicted for the Camden, New Jersey murder of Major Coxson, a flamboyant black businessman and unsuccessful candidate for mayor of Camden.

== 1977 Hanafi Siege ==
In 1977, Hamaas Abdul Khaalis led an attack in Washington, D.C., the 1977 Hanafi Siege. He said that the purpose of the siege was to bring attention to the murders of his wife, two children, and nine-day-old grandchild, and the shooting of his daughter.

The murder brought attention to the armed conflict between Sunni Muslims and Nation of Islam Muslims. Sunni Muslims believe Nation of Islam Muslims changed the doctrines of Islam by excluding whites and by accepting Elijah Muhammad as a messenger of Allah. Sunnis believe that Islam is color-blind and that whites can become Muslim. They also believe that Muhammad was the last messenger of Allah.

== See also ==
- List of journalists killed in the United States
- List of incidents of political violence in Washington, D.C.
