= Stefan Forbes =

American screenwriter and film director

Stefan Forbes is an American screenwriter and film director whose films and social justice work often address issues of race, class, masculinity, violence, and restorative justice.

== Career ==
Forbes wrote, shot, directed, and edited the Emmy Award-nominated feature documentary Hold Your Fire, about the longest hostage siege in NYPD history and the birth of modern hostage negotiation. It premiered at the 2021 Toronto International Film Festival and was named one of the best films of 2022 by The New York Times.

Forbes' first feature film was the 2008 documentary film Boogie Man: The Lee Atwater Story, about the life of political operative Lee Atwater. The Washington Post called it "one of the greatest political movies ever."

Forbes also shot and co-directed the one-hour documentary One More Dead Fish, seen on PBS, about environmentally friendly handline fishermen in Canada who seized a federal building and barricaded themselves inside for 26 days. Ken Loach called it "excellent" and historian Howard Zinn termed the film "an inspiring example of working people resisting the giant forces of globalization, in the great tradition of civil disobedience on behalf of justice."

In collaboration with Grammy-nominated composer John Beasley, Forbes wrote and directed the hour-long work Monk Recut, featuring recut performance footage of American composer Thelonious Monk in rhythmic, visual, and harmonic interplay with Beasley's inventive compositions for the big band MONK'estra. Featuring spoken word quotations from Monk's unique life philosophy, the work premiered at the LA Philharmonic at Disney Hall in February 2018. Noted Monk biographer Robin D.G. Kelley termed the work "fabulous...breathtaking."

Mr. Forbes currently has several television and feature film projects in development. He has served on the nominating committees of the New York Foundation for the Arts and the Independent Spirit Awards.

In addition to many music videos co-directed with Joseph Fergus, Jr., a former member of the rap group Concrete Clique, Forbes has also directed Emmy Award-nominated awareness campaigns about hunger in America featuring Charlize Theron, Gwyneth Paltrow, Steve Buscemi, Patti Smith, The Edge, Mike Myers, and Stanley Tucci. As a cinematographer, he shot seven independent feature films, one of which was nominated for an Independent Spirit Award.

Mr. Forbes has created awareness campaigns and consulted on media for ground-breaking social justice nonprofits such as The Posse Foundation, College Track, The International Rescue Committee, City Year, and Artists for Humanity. He has interviewed people such as Walter Cronkite, the Dalai Lama, Congressman John Lewis, Joseph Stiglitz, Michael Dukakis, Arne Duncan, Gov. Lamar Alexander, Gov. Terry McAuliffe, Sam Donaldson, Roger Stone, Mary Matalin, and Colin Powell.

Mr. Forbes often does his own cinematography, editing, writing, and directing. He is represented by Gersh and Management 360.

== Critical reception and awards ==
Hold Your Fire was called "one of the best films of 2022" by The New York Times. It was nominated for an Emmy, was a Humanitas Prize finalist, won the Metropolis Grand Jury Award at the 2021 Doc NYC film festival, and was awarded the 2020 Library of Congress Better Angels Award for historical film by Librarian of Congress Dr. Carla Hayden.

Forbes' production company, InterPositive Media, was named one of 2009's Global Top 100 Production Companies by RealScreen magazine.

Forbes is a 2006 New York Foundation for the Arts Fellow and the 2008 winner of the International Documentary Association's Emerging Filmmaker Award.

Boogie Man won a national Edward R. Murrow Award, the George Polk Award for Excellence in Journalism, and was nominated for the Writers Guild of America Award for Best Documentary Screenplay. The Washington Post called Boogie Man "one of the best political films ever". It was a Critic's Pick in The New York Times, The Washington Post, and The London Times.

Historian Howard Zinn called One More Dead Fish "An inspiring example of working people resisting the gigantic forces of globalization on behalf of justice". It won the Grand Prize at the Planet in Focus Film Festival, Canada's largest environmental film festival, and the Bronze Award at the Columbus International Film & Animation Festival, and was a finalist at the Seoul Human Rights Film Festival.

== Media Appearances ==
- Q&A with Stefan Forbes | Boogie Man – The Lee Atwater Story | FRONTLINE | PBS
- Interview on KCRW's The Treatment with Elvis Mitchell
- New York Times film review
- Roger Ebert review
- The Washington Post review "The Lee Atwater Story': Riveting Ruthlessness" 2
- Entertainment Weekly review
- Dalia Martinez, "Boogie Man: The Lee Atwater Story", Talk Of The Nation, September 23, 2008.
- John Powers, "A 'Boogie Man' With A Legacy Of Complicated Moves", Fresh Air, October 20, 2008.
- "The Paradox Of Lee Atwater", Talk Of The Nation, September 23, 2008
- "The Dirty South", On The Media, November 7, 2008
- Virginia Prescott, "How The Southern Strategy Painted The South Red", On Second Thought, NPR, September 17, 2018.
- Boogie Man - Critical Response
- Stefan Forbes discusses Boogie Man on MSNBC's Morning Joe
