= Hamaas Abdul Khaalis =

American Islamic leader (1921–2003)

Khalifi of Hanafi Madh-Hab Center in Washington D.C.
- In office 1958–2003
- Preceded by: Tasibur Uddein Rahman

Personal details
- Born: Ernest Timothy McGhee; 1921 Gary, Indiana, U.S.
- Died: November 13, 2003 (aged 81–82) FCI Butner, Butner, North Carolina, U.S.
- Occupation: Khalifi of Hanafi Madh-Hab Center in Washington D.C.

Hamaas Abdul Khaalis (1921 – November 13, 2003), born Ernest Timothy McGhee, was leader of the Hanafi Movement, a Black Muslim group based in Washington, D.C.

Khaalis founded the group following a split with the Nation of Islam in 1957. In 1971 he won the support of the basketball star Kareem Abdul-Jabbar, but in 1973, his family was murdered. Enraged by the murders, he organized a 1977 siege of Washington, D.C. in which two of 149 hostages died. He spent the rest of his life in prison after being found guilty of conspiracy to commit kidnapping while armed, second-degree murder, two counts of assault with intent to kill while armed, one count of assault with a dangerous weapon, and 24 counts of kidnapping while armed.

== Early life ==
Khaalis was born to Seventh-day Adventist parents in Gary, Indiana, as Ernest Timothy McGhee. He graduated 22nd in a class of 135 at Roosevelt High School, played percussion instruments, and eventually converted to Roman Catholicism.

He attended Purdue University and Mid-Western Conservatory. He was discharged from the U.S. Army on grounds of schizophrenia. He was a talented jazz drummer and played with Bud Powell, Charlie Parker, Max Roach, Billie Holiday, and J.J. Johnson in New York City. He was accepted to Columbia University, but his G.I. Bill funds expired after just one semester without the ability to finish his degree. Further applications were denied, which was a typical experience for black men attempting to make use of the G.I. Bill. Although he remained high-functioning in everyday life and excelled at jazz and his undergraduate studies, he was unable to find stable employment because of his schizophrenia diagnosis.

== Hanafi Movement ==
Influenced by the popularity of Islam in the New York jazz scene, Khaalis joined the Nation of Islam (NOI) and, in accordance with the group's rejection of "slave surnames," changed his name to Ernest 2X (also going by Ernest X or Ernest XX McGee). In 1954, at the suggestion of Malcolm X, Elijah Muhammad named Khaalis the National Secretary of the NOI, a position he held until 1957. Muhammad also sent him to Chicago to head the University of Islam. In an interview, Khaalis said, "Elijah once said that I was next in line to him, that it was me, not Malcolm X." In 1959, he appeared on the television documentary The Hate That Hate Produced alongside Malcolm X, but by this time he had already left the Nation, denouncing the personality cult around Elijah Muhammad.

At an unknown point following his departure, Khaalis met a Sunni Muslim mystic named Tasibur Uddein Rahman, an immigrant from Kolkata. Rahman was an active participant in the South Asian Barelvi movement and conveyed the movement's view of Islam to Khaalis. Instead of describing himself as Barelvi, Khaalis adopted the name "Hanafi," the predominant school of religious jurisprudence (madhhab) within the movement, and opened a "Hanafi Madh-Hab Center" in Washington, DC. It appears that Khaalis may have been drawn to the word "Hanafi," which means "rightly guided" and refers to the followers of Muhammad. In December 1960, Khaalis briefly returned to Chicago and personally appealed to Elijah Muhammad to take the shahada and convert to Sunni Islam. When this was denied, Khaalis founded a separate organization with the legal name American Social Federation for Mutual Improvement, Inc.

In 1968, he was arrested for attempted extortion but released on grounds of mental illness. The same year, militant blacks at Howard University formed a group called the Kokayi family. When that group was disbanded, many of its members became members of Hamaas' Hanafi American Mussulman's Rifle and Pistol Club, which was given a group membership charter by the National Rifle Association of America.

In 1971, Khaalis converted basketball player Lew Alcindor to Islam; after his conversion, Alcindor adopted the name Kareem Abdul-Jabbar. Abdul-Jabbar donated a fieldstone mansion, 7700 16th Street NW, to serve as the headquarters of Khaalis' organization in Washington, D.C.

== Feud with Nation of Islam ==
In 1972, Khaalis circulated an open letter that referred to Elijah Muhammad as a "lying deceiver" and asserted that he lured "former dope addicts and prostitutes to monk-like lives of sacrifice" that would "lead them to hell."

Khaalis claimed credit for Malcolm X's leaving the Nation of Islam. In a 1973 interview, Khaalis said he was teaching Malcolm X about Sunni Islam. "He used to come to my house on Long Island, and we would sit in his car for hours. He would meet me after he left the temple. Never in public because he knew they were after him. He was saying the wrong things."

=== Murder of his family ===
On January 18, 1973, Khaalis' family was murdered inside their Washington, D.C. home, in retaliation for letters that Khaalis had written against the Nation of Islam. Two members of his family survived: his daughter Amina was shot six times and sustained permanent brain damage, and his wife Bibi entered a vegetative state from which she never recovered. Khaalis would care for Bibi at home despite her constant moaning. Following the shooting, the Nation of Islam mocked Khaalis in their newspaper.

=== Hanafi Siege ===
In protest of the depiction of Muhammad in a film and to bring attention to his family's murderers. Khaalis planned and led the 1977 Hanafi Siege, leading to the deaths of two hostages. He was tried and convicted, receiving a sentence of 21 to 120 years in prison.

== Death ==
Khaalis died at the Federal Correctional Complex Prison in Butner, North Carolina, on November 13, 2003. The Hanafi Madh-Hab Center is still operating today but is mostly used by Khaalis' descendants.

== See also ==
- 1973 Brooklyn hostage crisis
- Wallace Fard Muhammad
- Dawud Salahuddin
- Bibliography of Malcolm X
- Bibliography of Martin Luther King Jr.

== Published works ==
- "Look and See The Key to Knowing and Understanding – Self-Identity, Self-Culture and Self-Heritage" A.S.F.M.I., 1972.
