= Rizza Islam =

Nation of Islam social media influencer, anti-vaccination activist

- Born: Ronnie Steven Islam; March 17, 1990 (age 36); Compton, California, U.S.
- Occupation: Nation of Islam minister
- Website: intellectualones.org

Ronnie Steven "Rizza" Islam (born March 17, 1990) is an American member of the Nation of Islam and a member of its paramilitary wing the Fruit of Islam. According to the Anti-Defamation League, he is a social media influencer with over 500,000 followers across several platforms, posting antisemitic, anti-LGBTQ, and anti-vaccine rhetoric, and promoting a range of conspiracy theories".

== Early life ==
Islam was born on March 17, 1990, in Compton, California. A member of the Nation of Islam (NOI), he attended the local NOI mosque as a child, and also became involved in the Church of Scientology.

== Nation of Islam work ==
Islam took on many roles within the Nation of Islam as a teenager, and later trained Fruit of Islam members while working at the WLC.

Under the guidance of Tony Muhammad, Islam gained prominence within the NOI. He met with Louis Farrakhan on multiple occasions in 2015 and 2016 as part of his work with anti-vaccine activism and promoting peace between rival street gangs in Los Angeles. Islam introduced prominent anti-vaccine activist Robert F. Kennedy Jr. to Muhammad and Farrakhan in 2015.

In February 2021, at the NOI's annual Saviours' Day conference, Islam shared the stage with prominent NOI leaders such as Ishmael Muhammad and Ava Muhammad.

== World Literacy Crusade ==
Rizza Islam's mother, Hanan Islam, and his adoptive father, Alfreddie Johnson, were the executive director and founder, respectively, of the World Literacy Crusade, a Scientology-backed nonprofit organization.

=== Fraud charges ===
In 2015, Islam, alongside some of his siblings and his mother, were arrested on Medi-Cal and insurance fraud charges at a Scientology-affiliated drug rehabilitation center at WLC offices in Compton, California. In March 2023, the trial was postponed. Two school principals and a coach had also been charged; all three were fired and two pleaded guilty. Two of Islam's sisters pleaded guilty, his mother died before trial, and in 2023 the state dropped charges for Islam—the last remaining defendant.

== Views ==
Through his social media channels and live events, Islam has promoted misinformation about COVID-19 vaccines, targeting African American communities with messages equating vaccines with eugenics and the Tuskegee syphilis experiment. Islam has spoken at meetings of America's Frontline Doctors. He has baselessly claimed that celebrities praising vaccination have been funded by "the medical industry" to promote vaccination, while not being vaccinated themselves.

He has been called one of the "disinformation dozen" responsible for 65% of COVID-19 anti-vaccine misinformation and conspiracy theories on the internet and social media, according to a report by the Center for Countering Digital Hate (CCDH) in 2021. Islam's Facebook account has been terminated in February 2021, as part of the platform's efforts to limit the spread of misinformation about COVID-19. Instagram and YouTube later deleted his accounts.

Rizza Islam has tweeted that Jewish people control sectors such as banking and the media. In 2020, Islam made multiple anti-Semitic statements during an appearance on TIDAL and Revolt TV, "Drink Champs".

Islam has claimed that nobody is born lesbian, gay, bisexual or transgender, and that LGBTQ identity is foisted upon individuals by "international bankers" and the US government to support population decline. He has also likened LGBTQ rights to rights for pedophiles, which he says the US government supports.

== Book ==
In 2019, Islam self-published the book Message to the Millineals, a 161-page missive promoting racial separation, written to "sound an urgent warning and to propose a solution."
