= Islam (name) =

- Pronunciation: Islaam
- Gender: neutral
- Language: Arabic

Origin
- Origin: the religion of Islam
- Region of origin: Muslim world

Other names
- Derived: Š-L-M
- Related names: Muslim, Salam

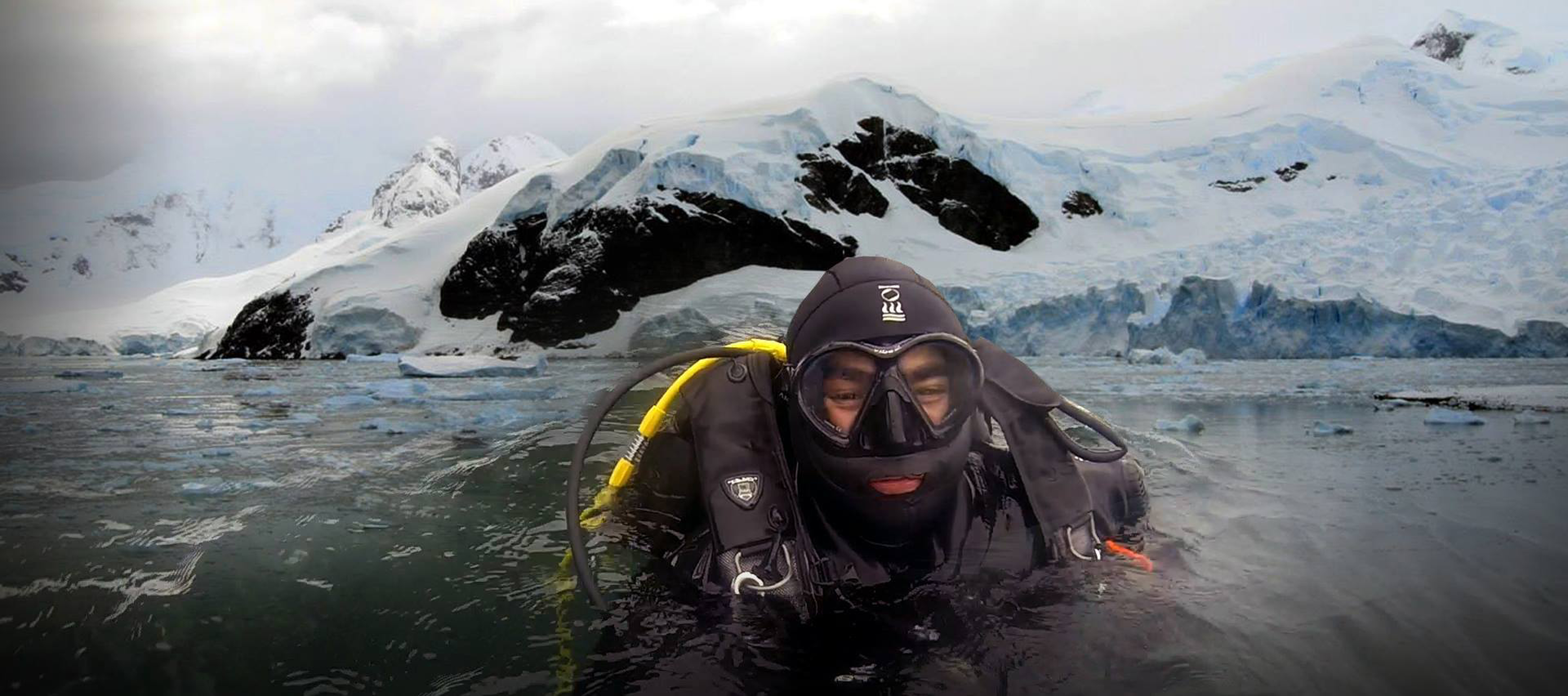
Egyptian adventurer Islam Kamel

Islam (Arabic: إِسْلَام, romanized: ʾIslām) is an Arabic male and female given name and surname meaning "acceptance, agreement approval (the truth)", "god-fearing, humility, devoutness", "acknowledgment, admission, yield, obeyance", "obedience, preservation, protection, safeguarding, keeping", "piety, loyalty, devotion", "subjection, submissiveness, wonder, admiration, respect, submitting".

Also, it is the name of the religion Islam and is primarily associated with Muslims. The name Islam is a diminutive of the name Aslam (أَسْلَم aslam), with both names stemming from the male noun-name Salaam.

Notable people with the name include:

== People with the given name ==
- Islam Alijaj (born 1986), Swiss disability activist
- Islam al-Behairy (born 1974), Egyptian liberalist
- Islam Alsultanov (born 2001), Russian footballer
- Islam Chipsy, stage name of Egyptian musician Islam Said
- Islam El-Shater (born 1976), Egyptian football player
- Islam Karimov (1938–2016), president of Uzbekistan
- Islam Makhachev (born 1991), Russian mixed martial artist, UFC Welterweight Champion
- Islam Satpayev (born 1998), Kazakh sport shooter
- Islam Slimani (born 1988), Algerian football player
- Noor Islam Dawar, Pakistani Pashtun human rights activist
- Shafiul Islam Mohiuddin (born 1955), Bangladeshi business magnate

== People with the surname ==
- Aktar Islam (born 1980), English restaurateur, curry chef and businessman
- Faisal Islam (born 1977), British journalist
- Faizul Islam (born 1986), Bangladeshi cricketer
- Faizul Islam (writer) (1963–2025), Bangladeshi economist and fiction writer
- Mitchell Islam (born 1990), Canadian figure skater
- Naeem Islam (born 1986), Bangladeshi cricketer
- Rizza Islam (born 1990), member of the Nation of Islam and social media influencer
- Runa Islam (born 1970), Bangladeshi-born British visual artist and filmmaker
- Rupam Islam (born 1974), Bengali singer and composer
- Sabirul Islam (born 1990), British author, entrepreneur and motivational speaker
- Saiful Islam (disambiguation), multiple people
- Samira Islam, Saudi Arabian pharmacologist
- Samirul Islam (born 1987), Indian-Bengali social activist
- Sanchita Islam (1973–2023), English artist, painter, writer and filmmaker of Bangladeshi descent
- Shafiul Islam (born 1989), Bangladeshi cricketer
- Shahara Islam, the youngest victim killed of the 7 July 2005 London bombings
- Taijul Islam (born 1992), Bangladeshi cricketer
- Umar Islam, formerly Brian Young (born 1978), member of the foiled 2006 transatlantic aircraft plot
- Yusuf Islam, British singer, born Stephen Demetre in 1948 and formerly known as Cat Stevens

== Compound names with Islam as a suffix ==
- Manzurul Islam (disambiguation), multiple people
- Monirul Islam, multiple people
- Nazrul Islam (disambiguation), multiple people
- Nurul Islam (disambiguation), multiple people
- Qamar al-Islam (disambiguation), multiple people
- Sirajul Islam (disambiguation), multiple people
- Tajul Islam (disambiguation), multiple people
- Zahurul Islam (disambiguation), multiple people

== See also ==
- Islamuddin (disambiguation), multiple people
- Islamul Ahsan (born 1992), Bangladeshi cricketer
