= Islamuddin =

Islam Uddin (Arabic: إسلام الدين) is an Arabic phrase meaning "Submission of the religion". It may refer to:

- Islam-ud-Din (1925–1945), British Indian Army soldier
- Islamuddin Shaikh, Pakistani politician
- Islam Uddin (born 1974), Indian-Bengali communist
- Mohammed Islamuddin, nagar panchayat chairman of Charthaval, India

== See also ==
- Islamul Ahsan (born 1992), Bangladeshi cricketer
