= Star Chamber (disambiguation) =

The Star Chamber was a notorious English court of law.

Star Chamber may also refer to:

- The Star-Chamber, an 1854 novel by William Harrison Ainsworth
- Star Chamber (play), a 1936 play by Noël Coward
- The Star Chamber, a 1983 thriller film starring Michael Douglas
- Star Chamber: The Harbinger Saga, an online collectible card game

== Other uses ==
- Star Chamber Academy, a defunct school in London, England
- Star Chamber Cave, a limestone cave in the British Overseas Territory of Gibraltar
