= Manzur =

Manzur (Arabic: منظور Manẓūr; also spelled Manzoor or Manzour) is a male Arabic name meaning "approved" or "accepted." It is most commonly used in South and Southeast Asia. Manzur is also a Spanish surname.

== Given name ==
- Manzoor Ahmad (born 1934), Pakistani philosopher and scholar
- Manzur Ahmed Bacchu Mia (died 2019), Bangladeshi politician
- Manzoor Ahmed Choudhury, Bangladeshi diplomat
- Manzur Ahmed Chowdhury Madaripuri, Bangladeshi zoologist
- Manzurul Ahsan Munshi (born 1950), Bangladeshi politician
- Manzoor Alam Beg (1931–1998), Bangladeshi photographer
- Mohammad Manzur Alam, Mayor of Chittagong, Bangladesh
- Manzurul Alam, retired major general of the Bangladesh Army
- Syed Manzur Elahi (1942–2025), Bangladeshi businessman
- Manzoor Hussain (field hockey) (1958–2022), a Pakistani field hockey player
- Manzoor Hussain Atif (1928–2008), a Pakistani field hockey player and sports administrator
- Manzur Hossain (1956–2024), Bangladeshi politician
- Syed Manzur Hossain, Bangladeshi politician
- Manzurul Imam (died 2003), Bangladeshi lawyer and politician
- Manzurul Islam, multiple people
- Manzur Karim Piash (1958–2014), Bangladeshi economist
- Manzurul Karim Khan Chowdhury, Bangladeshi diplomat
- Manzurul Nabi, Indian politician
- Manzoor Pashteen (born 1994), Pashtun human rights activist
- A . K. Manzur Morshed (1938–2023), Bangladeshi academic and linguist
- Manzur Nu'mani (1905–1997), Indian religious scholar
- Manzur Qadir (1913–1974), Pakistani jurist and politician
- Manzur Rahman Biswas (1950–2023), Bangladeshi politician
- Manzur Qader Quraishi (born 1953), Bangladeshi politician
- Manzoor Wattoo (1939–2025), Pakistani politician
- M. H. Khan "Manzur", Bangladeshi businessman and politician

== Surname ==
- Muhammed Abul Manzur (1940–1981), Bangladeshi army officer responsible for the assassination of President Ziaur Rahman
- Hafiz Liaqat Manzoor, a Pakistani held in detention in the United States' Guantanamo Bay detention camps
- Ibn Manzur (1233–1311/12), an Arabic lexicographer
- Juan Luis Manzur (born 1969), an Argentine politician
- Kazeem Manzur (born 1991), a British racecar driver
- Khurram Manzoor (born 1986), a Pakistani cricketer
- Maqbula Manzoor (1938–2020), a Bangladeshi writer
- Mustaqim Manzur (born 1982), a Singaporean footballer
- Sarfraz Manzoor (born 1971), a British writer and broadcaster
- Zahida Manzoor (born 1958), an English businesswoman and civil servant

== Other ==
- A type of tar with a specific, pointed body shape and often a wooden soundboard instead of skin.

== See also ==
- Manzoor Colony, a neighbourhood of Jamshed Town, Karachi, Pakistan
- Mansur, a similar Arabic name
