= Manzurul Islam =

Manzur ul Islam (Bengali: মঞ্জূরুল ইসলাম) is a Bengali name of Arabic origin. Notable bearers of the name include:

- Syed Manzoorul Islam (1951–2025), Bangladeshi critic, writer, and academic
- Manjurul Islam Liton (1968–2016), politician
- Mohammad Manjural Islam (born 1979), cricketer
- Sheikh Manjurul Islam, West Bengali politician

== See also ==
- Manzur
- Islam (name)
