= Tajul Islam =

Tajul Islam (Bengali: তাজুল ইসলাম), a Bengali masculine given name of Arabic origin, may also refer to:

- Tajul Islam Choudhury (1944–2018), Bangladeshi politician and Opposition Chief Whip
- Tajul Islam (worker) (1950–1984), Bangladeshi trade unionist
- AB Tajul Islam (born 1951), Bangladeshi minister and former army captain
- Mohammad Tajul Islam (born 1973) Bangladeshi lawyer, Chief Prosecutor of the International Crimes Tribunal
- Mohammad Tajul Islam (born 1955), Bangladeshi Minister of Local Government, Rural Development and Co-operatives
- Tajul Islam Md. Faruk (died 2019), Bangladeshi politician

== See also ==
- Taj
- Islam (name)
