= Ava Muhammad =

American Islamic minister

Ava Muhammad (9 November 1951 – 25 August 2022) was an American Black Muslim. In 1998, she became the first female Minister to preside over a mosque and region in the history of the Nation of Islam (NOI). Her job as national spokesperson for Minister Farrakhan was among the most prominent in the organization — a post formerly held by Malcolm X under former Nation of Islam leader Elijah Muhammad. Minister Ava Muhammad was also a member of the Muslim Girls Training (MGT).
