= Fruit of Islam =

Paramilitary of the Nation of Islam (NOI)

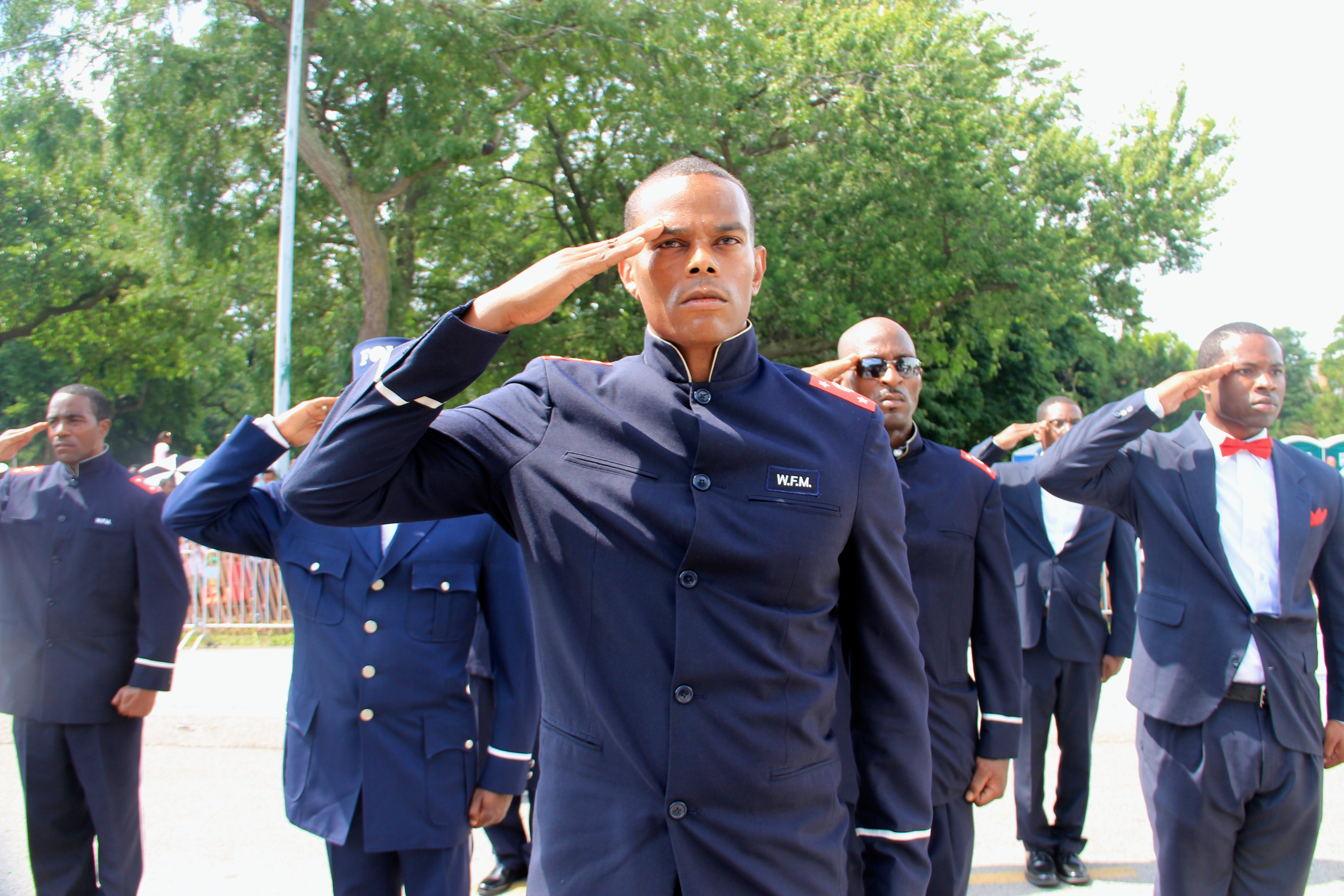
Members of the Fruit of Islam at Chicago's Bud Billiken Parade in 2015

The Fruit of Islam (FOI) is the paramilitary wing of the Nation of Islam. The Fruit of Islam wear distinctive blue, brown, or white uniforms and caps and have units at all NOI temples. Louis Farrakhan, as head of the Nation of Islam, is commander-in-chief of the Fruit of Islam, and his son, Mustapha Farrakhan Sr., is second in command as the Supreme Captain. The women's counterpart to the Fruit of Islam is Muslim Girls Training (MGT).

The Fruit of Islam draws its membership from male members in Nation of Islam mosques. All men registered in the Nation of Islam as members are by default a part of the FOI. All Nation of Islam mosques have a branch of the FOI headed by a local captain who is appointed by the local minister. While NOI does not release membership figures, estimates made in 2007 for total membership in the NOI range from 30,000 to 50,000.

== History ==
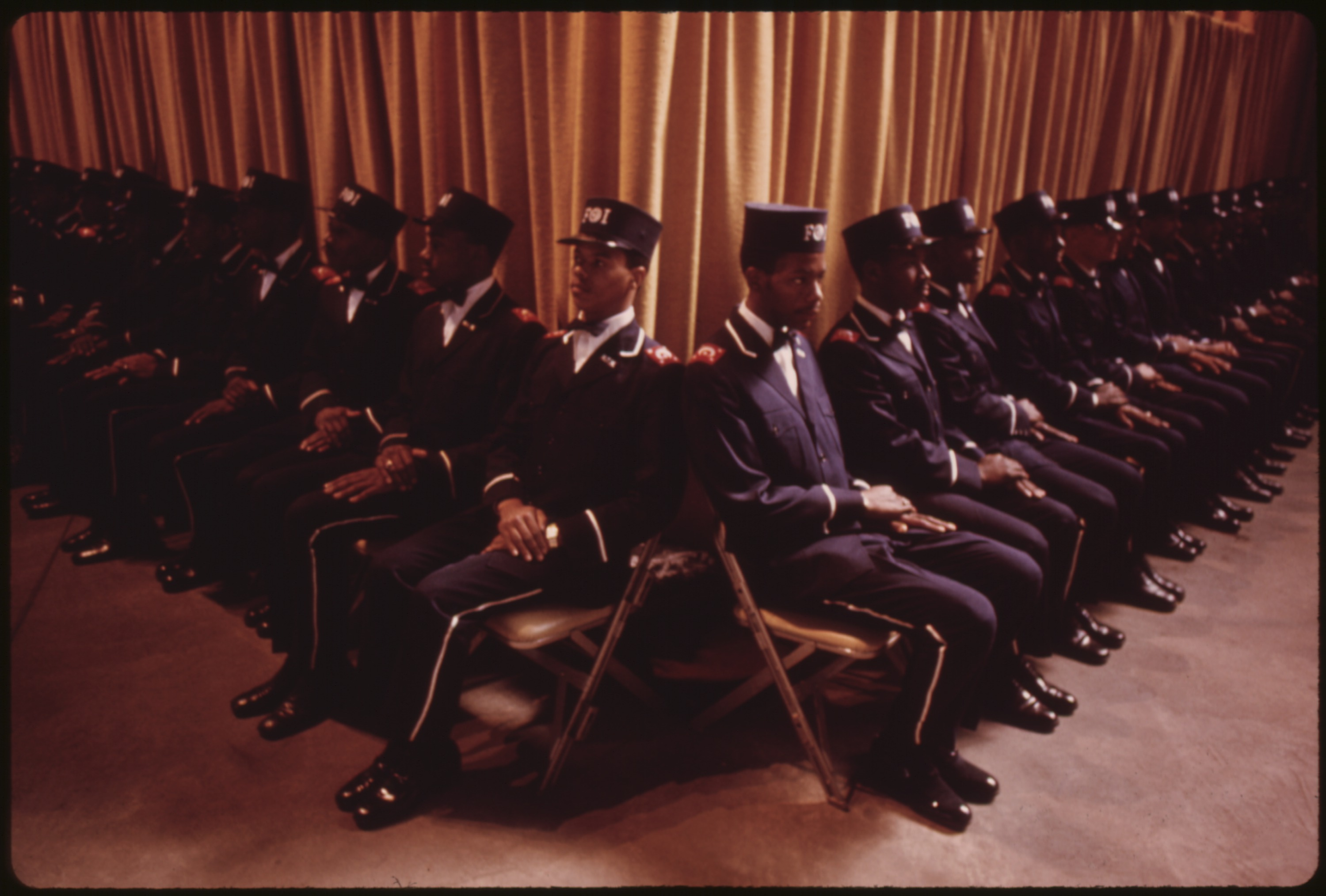
FOI members in Chicago, 1974

The Fruit of Islam is one of the original institutions of the NOI, created by its founder W. D. Fard in 1933, shortly before his final disappearance. The men, mostly young, active members, were considered the "fruit" of the new nation. At the time the FOI was created to help defend the members of the NOI and all others. It existed until the death of Elijah Muhammad in 1975. When Warith Deen Muhammad took control of the NOI he disbanded the FOI. The organization was then reorganized by Louis Farrakhan when he reestablished the NOI.

== NOI security agency ==
In 1988, the NOI created a separate security agency using members of the FOI. The agency received contracts primarily to patrol and staff public housing complexes in tough urban areas like Baltimore, Washington, D.C., Philadelphia, Chicago, and Los Angeles and received at least $20 million in the 1990s for security work. NOI Security had notable successes in Washington, D.C., projects particularly, but had difficulty in others and faced opposition by some members of the United States Congress and the Anti-Defamation League, among others. It also faced scrutiny from federal agencies for racial and gender preference in hiring and from the Internal Revenue Service for failure to withhold taxes from employees.

== Mission statement ==
The FOI says its mission is to "teach civilization, and teach what they know to those who do not know". An NOI website urging men to enroll in the FOI describes members as "brave fighter[s] for Allah" engaged in "a unique war for the very heart and soul of a people". The site explains, "The responsibility of the F.O.I. is that of a head of house: protection, provision, and maintenance of the Nation of Islam (all Original People). The F.O.I. are militant in the sense that our operations are done as a unit".

== See also ==
- Zion's Camp
- Sea Org
