= Saviours' Day =

Holiday in Nation of Islam

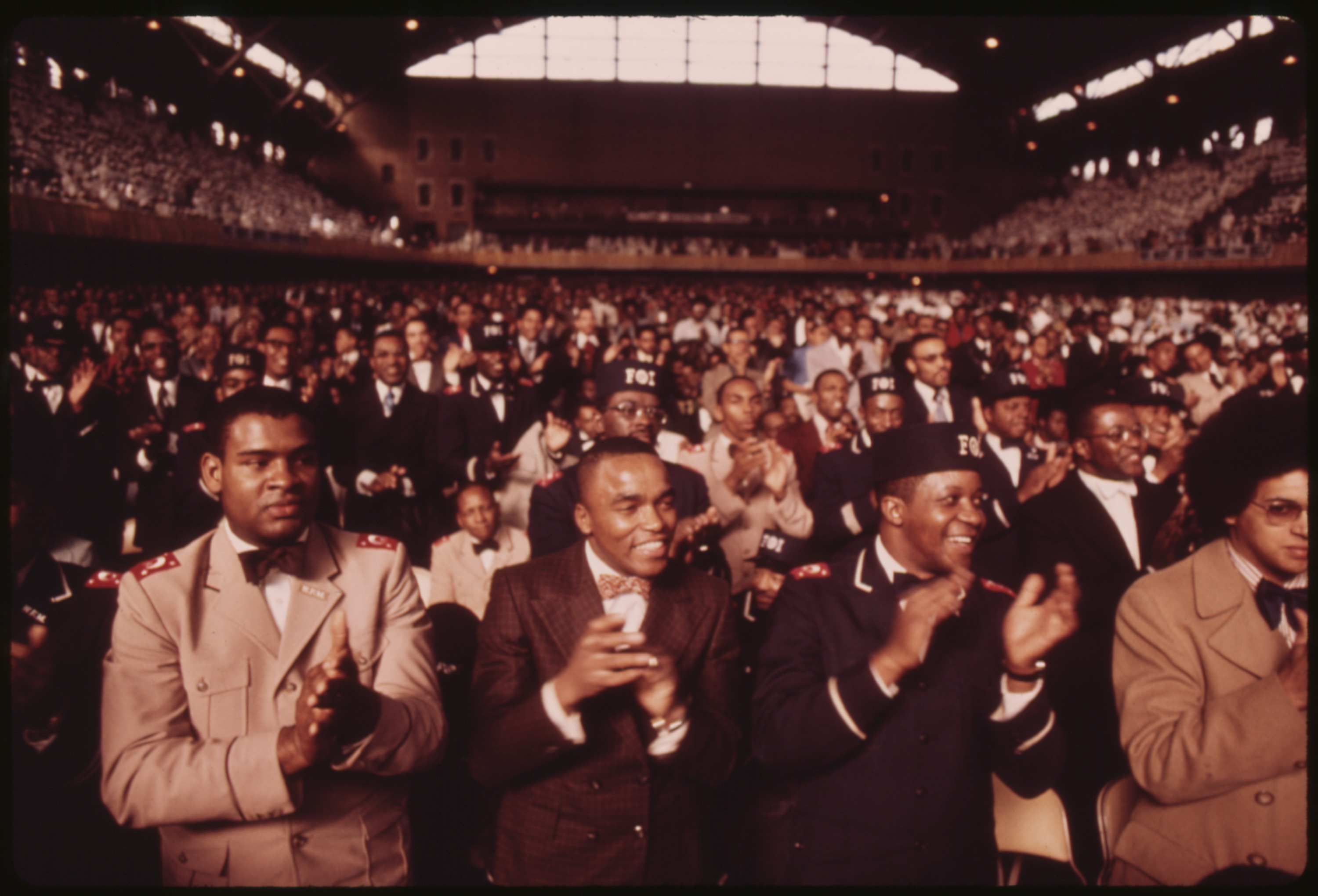
Men at Saviours' Day 1974

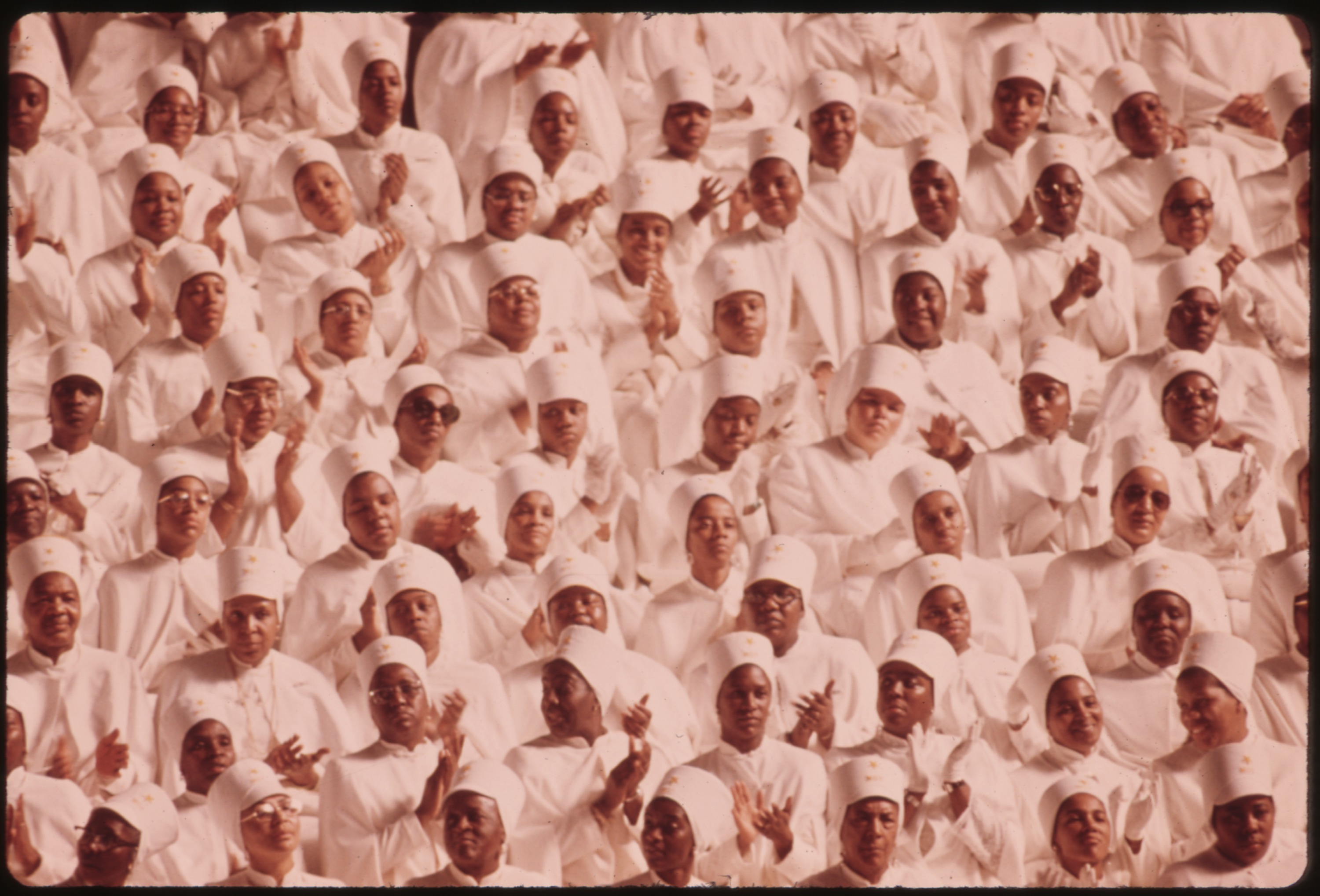
Women at Saviours' Day 1974

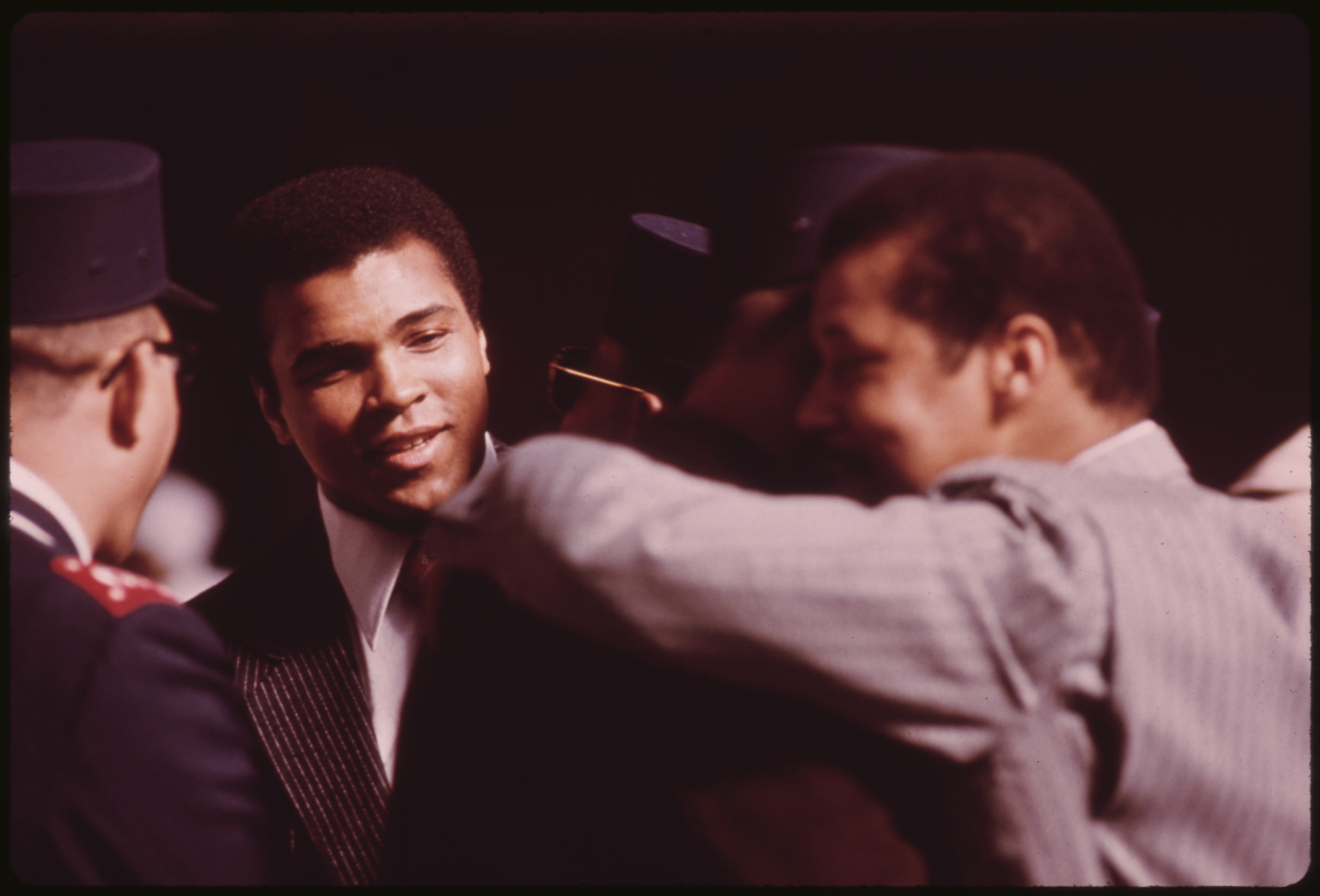
Muhammad Ali attending Saviours' Day 1974

Saviours' Day is a holiday of the Nation of Islam commemorating the birth of its founder, Master Wallace Fard Muhammad (W. D. Fard), officially stated to be February 26, 1877. It was established by Elijah Muhammad.

== History ==
The Community of Imam Warith Deen Mohammed (American Society of Muslims) observed a similar celebration, observed on the last weekend of February. Warith Deen Mohammed (son of Elijah Muhammad) changed the name of the celebration to Survival Day in 1976 and then to Ethnic Survival Day from 1979 to 1980 and made it a week long celebration. The change formed part of his rejection of his father's portrayal of Fard as a divine savior.

Warith Deen Mohammed eventually discontinued the celebration of Survival Day for his community and eventually returned to the celebration of Saviours' Day with the emphasis being on the history of the Nation of Islam and Elijah Muhammad and not W. D. Fard. Warith Deen Mohammed re-instituted Saviours' Day for his community on Feb 26, 2000, after joining the Nation of Islam's Saviours' Day that year.

Louis Farrakhan reconvened Saviours' Day in 1981 when he reestablished the Nation of Islam under his leadership. Under Farrakhan's leadership, the annual commemoration has become a three-day gathering with speakers, seminars and workshops. Since 2010, it has included a Dianetics Auditor graduation ceremony, overseen by officials from both the Nation and also the Church of Scientology. Under Farrakhan, Dianetics has been advocated publicly since 2010, and it has been embraced by his followers, over a thousand of whom are now trained in Dianetics auditing.

When Elijah Muhammad started the celebration, he called it Saviour's Day. Farrakhan moved the apostrophe, changing it to Saviours' Day to add Elijah Muhammad as a saviour along with Master Fard Muhammad.

Other, smaller Nation of Islam communities not related to Minister Farrakhan also hold Saviour's Day celebrations.

== Spelling ==
The Nation of Islam uses the British spelling version of the word saviour, rather than the American spelling savior. The Nation of Islam under Louis Farrakhan's leadership places a possessive apostrophe at the end of the word, emphasising the plural to indicate that “Black men and women must be the ‘saviours’ of themselves and their communities.” This plural form of the spelling was announced in 1983 to represent that responsibility. However, the original spelling with the apostrophe before the "s" is also used.
