= Manzurul Nabi =

Indian politician

Member of Parliament 2nd Lok Sabha
- Constituency: Saharanpur

Personal details
- Education: B.A pass

Manzurul Nabi was an Indian politician and a member of parliament from Saharanpur (Lok Sabha constituency). His political party was the Indian National Congress. As a member of 2nd Lok Sabha he was in office from April 1957 to March 1962.
