= Star Chamber Academy =

Defunct school in London, England

Coordinates: 51.5065°N 0.2426°W

Information
- Age: 5 to 16
- Enrollment: 60
- Affiliation: Nation of Islam

Star Chamber Academy was a Nation of Islam (NOI)-operated school in the Borough of Hammersmith and Fulham, west London.

In 1998 the school had 60 pupils between the ages of five and six. The school, located in the Simba Community Centre in Shepherd's Bush, taught United Kingdom recognised curriculum in addition to African history, history of black historical figures, and NOI practices. The Hammersmith and Fulham Council, which owned the Simba centre, ordered the school to leave. In addition the Department for Education and Employment threatened to close the school if it did not register with the department. NOI supporters protested the proposed expulsion and the proposed closure. By 1999 the school was not ultimately expelled from the community centre, and it registered with the department before the deadline. However the school is no longer operating.
