= Nation of Islam =

African American new religious organization

- Abbreviation: NOI
- Formation: July 4, 1930; 96 years ago
- Founder: Wallace Fard Muhammad
- Founded at: Detroit, Michigan, U.S.
- Type: New religious movement
- Legal status: Active
- Headquarters: Mosque Maryam, Chicago, Illinois
- Location: United States
- Members: c. 50,000 ▼ (2007 estimate)
- Official language: English
- Leader: Louis Farrakhan
- Key people: Elijah Muhammad; Wallace Muhammad; Malcolm X
- Subsidiaries: Fruit of Islam; Muhammad University of Islam; Muslim Girls Training; Star Chamber Academy
- Website: noi.org

The Nation of Islam (NOI) is a religious organization founded in the United States by Wallace Fard Muhammad in 1930. A centralized and hierarchical group committed to black nationalism, it focuses attention on the black African diaspora, especially on African Americans. While describing itself as Islamic and using Islamic terminology, its religious tenets differ substantially from orthodox Islamic traditions. Scholars of religion characterize it as a new religious movement.

The Nation of Islam teaches that there has been a succession of mortal gods, each a black man named Allah, of whom Fard Muhammad was the latest. It claims that the first Allah created the earliest humans, the dark-skinned Original Asiatic Race, whose members possessed inner divinity and from whom all people of color descend. It maintains that a scientist named Yakub then created the white race, a group that lacked inner divinity and whose intrinsic violence led them to overthrow the Original Asiatic Race and achieve global dominance. Setting itself against the white-dominated society of the United States, the NOI campaigns for the creation of an independent African American nation-state and calls for African Americans to be economically self-sufficient and separatist. A millenarian tradition, it maintains that Fard Muhammad will soon return aboard a spaceship to wipe out the white-dominated order and establish a utopia. Members worship in buildings, varyingly called temples or mosques. Practitioners are expected to live disciplined lives, adhering to strict dress codes, specific dietary requirements, and patriarchal gender roles.

Wallace Fard Muhammad established the Nation of Islam in Detroit. He drew on various sources, especially Noble Drew Ali's Moorish Science Temple of America and black nationalist trends like Garveyism. After Fard Muhammad disappeared in 1934, the leadership of the NOI was assumed by Elijah Muhammad, who expanded the NOI's teachings, declared Fard Muhammad to have been the latest Allah, and built the group's business empire. Attracting growing attention in the late 1950s and 1960s, the NOI's influence expanded through high-profile members such as the black nationalist activist Malcolm X and the boxer Muhammad Ali. Deeming it a threat to domestic security, the Federal Bureau of Investigation worked to undermine the group. Following Elijah Muhammad's death in 1975, his son Wallace D. Muhammad took over the organization, moving it towards Sunni Islam and renaming it the World Community of Al-Islam in the West. Members seeking to retain Elijah Muhammad's teachings re-established the Nation of Islam under Louis Farrakhan's leadership in 1977. Farrakhan expanded the NOI's economic and agricultural operations and continued to develop its beliefs, for instance by drawing connections with Dianetics.

Based in the United States, the Nation of Islam has also established a presence elsewhere, with membership open only to people of color. In 2007 it was estimated to have 50,000 members. The Nation has also influenced the formation of other groups like the Five-Percent Nation, United Nation of Islam, and Nuwaubian Nation. Muslim critics accuse the NOI of promoting teachings that are not authentically Islamic. Other critics, like the Southern Poverty Law Center and the Anti-Defamation League, have characterized it as a hate group that promotes racism against white people, antisemitism, and anti-LGBT rhetoric.

== Definition ==
Scholars of religion classify the Nation of Islam (NOI) as a new religious movement. Elsewhere, they have labeled it an African American religion, a black nationalist religion, an ethnoreligious movement, a religious nationalist movement, a social movement, and a form of esotericism. Given that extraterrestrial spaceships feature prominently in the group's teachings, scholars have also highlighted commonalities between the NOI and UFO religions. More broadly, the sociologist of religion Susan J. Palmer characterized the Nation as forming part of a "Black cultic milieu" in which it coexists alongside other black-oriented new religions, including Rastafari, the Black Hebrew Israelites, and the Nuwaubian Nation.

The Nation of Islam has existed in two organizational forms: the first, founded by Wallace Fard Muhammad in the 1930s and lasting until 1975, and the second, established by Louis Farrakhan in the late 1970s. Certain differences exist between these forms, with Farrakhan's Nation adapting existing teachings and permitting a greater role for women. As an organization, the Nation is highly centralized, hierarchical, and authoritarian. Although some members privately violate the Nation's rules on personal conduct, and may not fully embrace all of the group's teachings, practitioners generally demonstrate a high degree of uniformity and conformity.

=== Relationship to Christianity and Islam ===
The flag of the Nation of Islam is a white crescent and star on a red background. The group calls its flag, which is based on that of Turkey, "the national".

The NOI has no holy text of its own. Instead, it draws on the Christian Bible and the Quran yet provides profoundly different interpretations of these scriptures compared to those typically found in normative Christianity and Islam. Having arisen within the Christian-majority United States, the Nation condemns Christianity, presenting it as a tool of white supremacy. To the group, whose members are commonly called "Black Muslims", their identification with Islam provides an alternative to mainstream, Christian-dominated American culture.

In describing itself as Islamic, the NOI seeks to reclaim what it regards as the historic Muslim identity of the African American people. The group's second leader, Elijah Muhammad, argued that "Islam is the natural religion of the Black Nation." The NOI views itself as part of the Islamic world, and incorporates Islamic elements into its practices, including the liturgical use of Arabic, the recitation of salah—the obligatory prayer services recited by Muslims—five times daily, and the adoption of a flag based on that of Muslim-majority Turkey.

Despite this, the Nation has little in common with mainstream Islam. Its claims about the nature of God and the afterlife differ fundamentally from Muslim teaching; similarly, it does not accept the standard Islamic belief that the Arabian religious leader Muhammad was God's final and most important messenger. Although using standard Islamic terms, it gives these completely different meanings to those understood by most Muslims. Mainstream Muslims generally see the NOI as a movement that selectively adopts Islamic ideas but is not truly Islamic. From mainstream Islamic perspectives, its teachings are heretical, with its theology being shirk (blasphemy). Accordingly, some scholars of religion have characterized it as "quasi-Islamic", or referred to it as "Fardian Islam", "pseudo-Islam", or "nontraditional Islam".

== History ==
=== Background ===
Islam existed in North America prior to the formation of the United States. African Muslims were among the Spanish expeditions that explored the continent during the early modern period, and were also among the enslaved people transported there via the Atlantic slave trade of the 16th to 19th centuries. Although Islam died out among African Americans in the generations following the American Revolution, this historical association influenced the emergence of groups like the NOI in the early 20th century.

Various older movements influenced the NOI, including African American Christianity, Freemasonry, and the Jehovah's Witnesses. However, the scholar of religion Dawn Gibson characterized the Nation as having principally been "born out of a fusion" between the Garveyist political movement and the Moorish Science Temple of America. Central to Garveyism was the Jamaican black nationalist Marcus Garvey, who lived in the US from 1916 to 1927 and who formed the Universal Negro Improvement Association and African Communities League (UNIA). Garveyism gave the Nation its black nationalism, including its emphasis on black self-sufficiency and enterprise. The second key influence, the Moorish Science Temple, promoted an idiosyncratic religion that its followers claimed was Islamic. This had been established in 1913 by the African American Noble Drew Ali in Newark, New Jersey; he maintained that African Americans should refer to themselves as "Moorish Americans", reflecting what he believed were their connections to the Muslim Moors of North Africa.

=== Wallace Fard Muhammad ===
My name is W. D. Fard, and I come from the Holy City of Mecca. More about myself I will not tell you yet, for the time has not yet come. I am your brother. You have not yet seen me in my royal robes.

— A message from Fard Muhammad, as reported by an early follower

The NOI was founded by Wallace Fard Muhammad, who began preaching to Detroit's African Americans in July 1930. Fard Muhammad claimed to be an Arab from Mecca who had come on a mission to the African American people, whom he called the "Nation of Islam", to restore them to their original faith. Later, the Nation began to teach that Fard Muhammad had been the latest Allah (God). They claim he was born in Mecca on February 26, 1877, the son of a black Meccan and a white woman from the Caucasus Mountains. Being half-white, the NOI maintain, was necessary to allow Fard Muhammad to move freely in white society.

Outside the Nation, various theories have been proposed as to Fard Muhammad's identity. The Federal Bureau of Investigation (FBI) matched Fard Muhammad's fingerprints to those of Wallie D. Ford, who had a record of arrests and had served a three-year sentence for drug charges. Ford had been released in May 1929, a year before Fard Muhammad's appearance. FBI reports suggest he was a foreign national who entered the US illegally in 1913. The NOI reject Fard Muhammad's identification as Ford, claiming that the FBI forged this evidence.

Fard Muhammad wrote two manuals, the Secret Ritual of the Nation of Islam and the Teaching for the Lost Found Nation of Islam in a Mathematical Way. He established the Nation's administration, its school system, and both the Fruit of Islam paramilitary for men and the Muslim Girls Training School for women. His following grew rapidly, with his meetings, held three days a week, attracting 7,000 to 8,000 people, mostly southern migrants. One of his most significant disciples was the African American Elijah Poole, who joined in 1931; Fard Muhammad appointed him supreme minister of the Nation and renamed him Elijah Muhammad. In 1933, Elijah Muhammad set up a new NOI temple on Chicago's South Side.

The early NOI faced problems from law enforcement. In 1932 the Detroit Police Department arrested an NOI member for murder. The police then raided the Nation's headquarters and arrested Fard Muhammad, but he was soon released. He would be subsequently arrested several further times, with his September 1933 Chicago arrest for disorderly conduct constituting his last known verified whereabouts. In 1934, Fard Muhammad disappeared without notifying his followers or designating a successor.

=== Elijah Muhammad's leadership ===
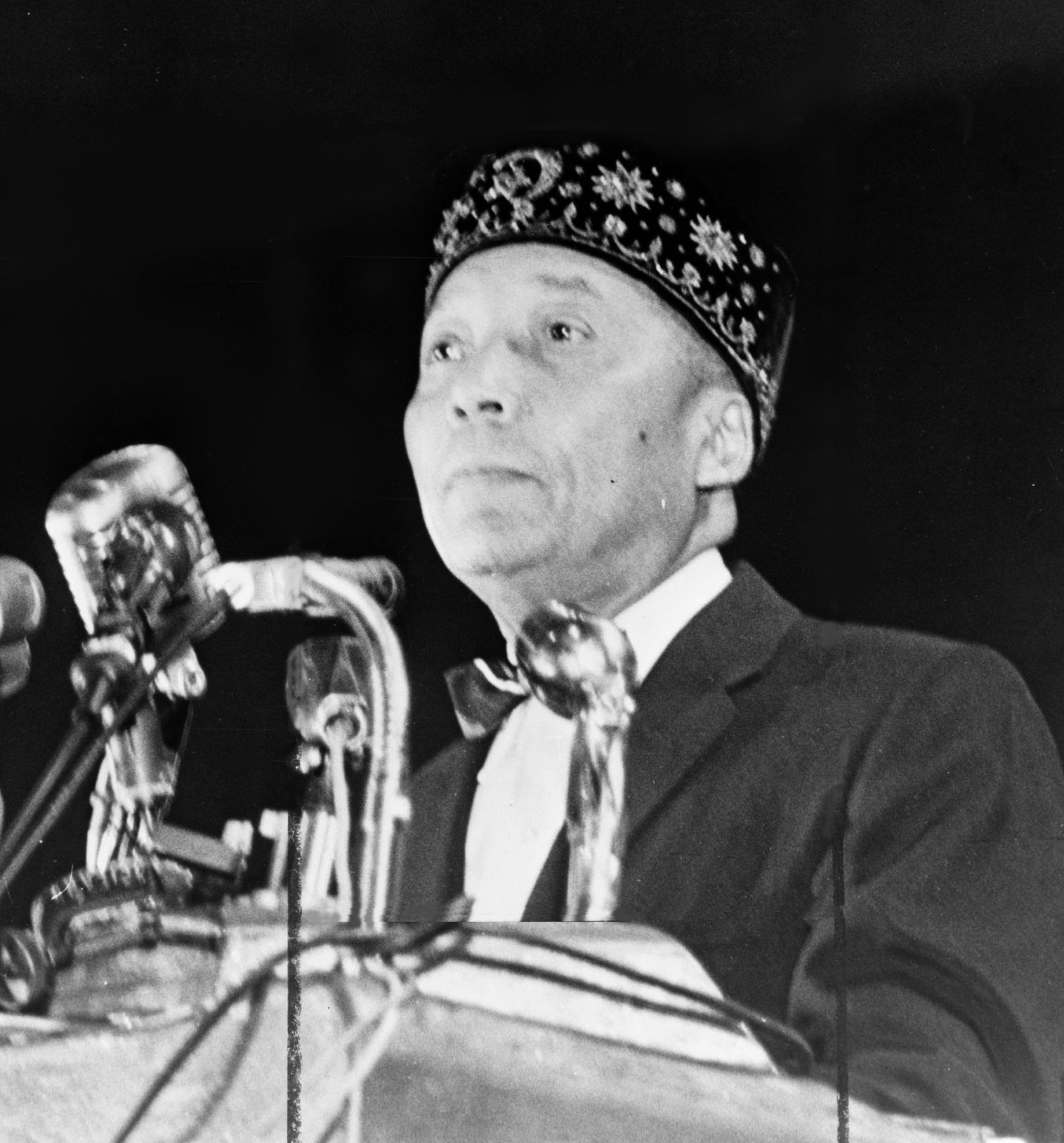
Elijah Muhammad, who took over the Nation after its founder's disappearance

Elijah Muhammad then became head of the Nation, relocating its headquarters to Chicago, and transmitting his ideas through his publications and speeches. Under his leadership, the NOI's theology took its distinctive form; Elijah Muhammad claimed that Fard Muhammad had been the latest Allah, who had departed the Earth but left Elijah behind as his messenger.

During the Second World War, many Nation members refused the military draft, leading the FBI to arrest 65 of them, including Elijah Muhammad, in September 1942. Elijah remained imprisoned until August 1946, during which time his wife, Clara, largely ran the organization. Despite these set-backs, Elijah Muhammad oversaw the Nation's development into a multi-million dollar business empire incorporating apartments, factories, farms and a small bank. He himself lived at a villa named The Palace in Chicago's Hyde Park area, and in winter moved to a ranch outside Phoenix, Arizona.

The NOI's membership grew substantially during the latter part of the 1950s. In 1959, the FBI encouraged the media to attack the group, with the US press increasingly framing the NOI as anti-American and black supremacist. This negative coverage nonetheless gave the group significant attention and assisted its recruitment. Further press attention came in 1962, when Los Angeles police raided a Nation temple, during which one member was killed. Additional issues arose in 1963, when a schism in the Nation's Temple Number 7 in Harlem, New York City led to the creation of a new movement, the Five Percent Nation of Islam.

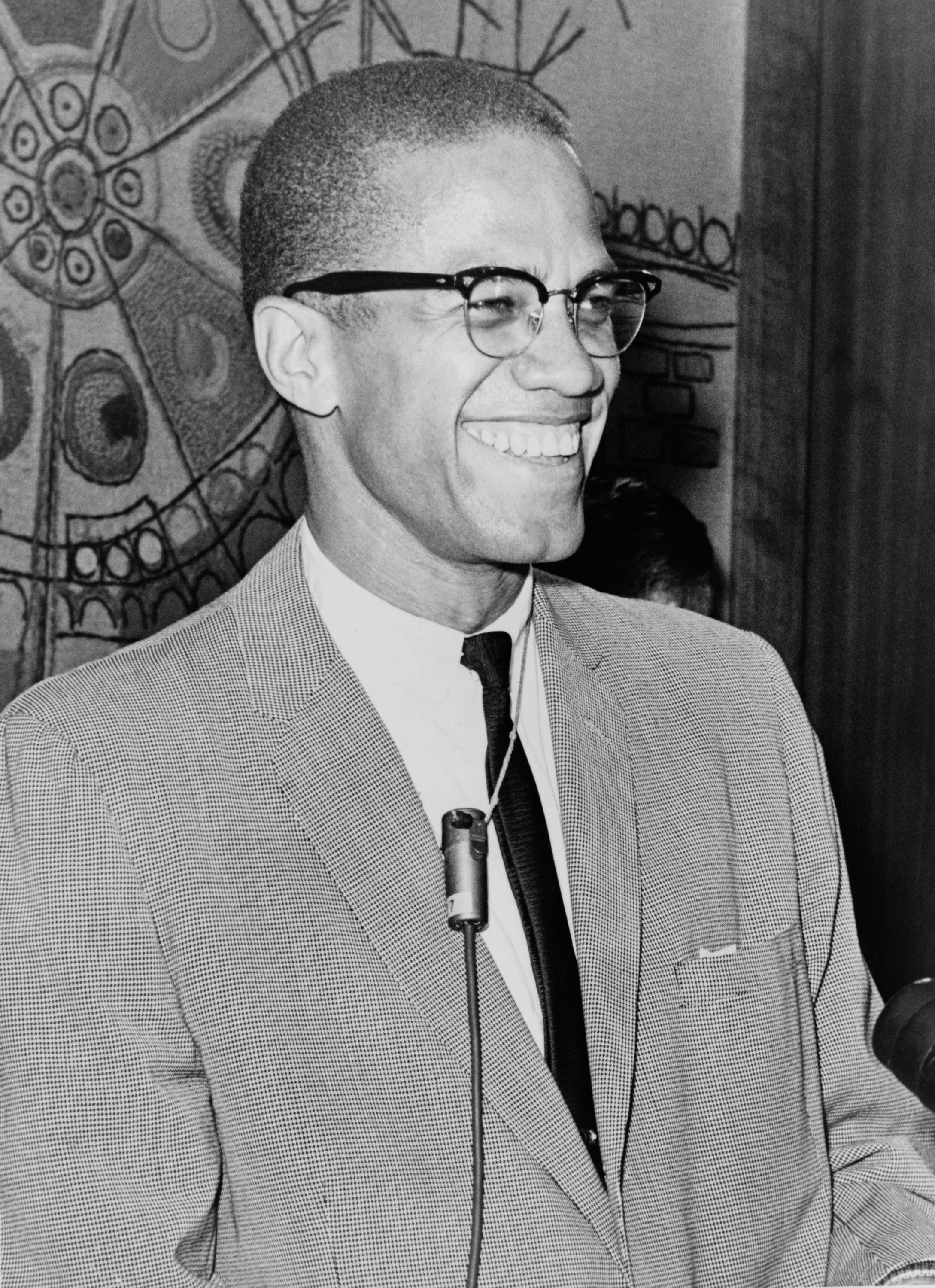
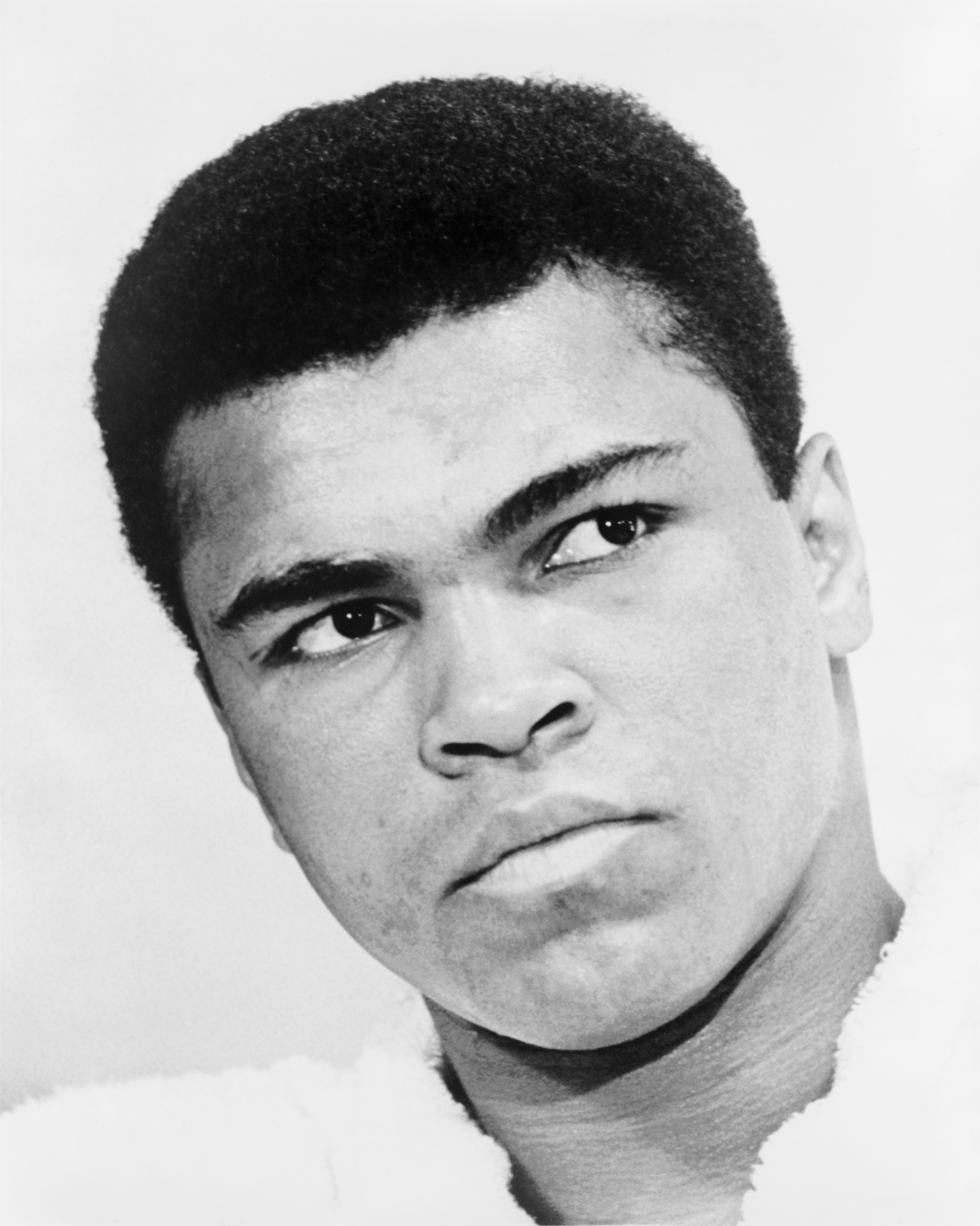
During the early 1960s, Malcolm X (left) and Muhammad Ali (right) helped raise the profile of the Nation.

One of the NOI's most significant members in this period was Malcolm X, who rose swiftly through its hierarchy. In 1960, he launched the newspaper Muhammad Speaks, which reached a circulation of over 600,000, and in 1963 he became the Nation's first national representative. He also traveled internationally; in Britain, he met with Michael de Freitas, who joined the Nation and formed a British branch. In March 1964, Malcolm X left the Nation and became a Sunni Muslim, subsequently criticizing Elijah Muhammad's extramarital affairs. In February 1965, Malcolm X was assassinated, with three NOI members convicted of the killing the following year. Another prominent NOI member was the boxer Muhammad Ali. He encountered the Nation in 1961 and received significant media criticism after announcing his membership of the group in 1964.

In 1972, the NOI bought the St. Constantine Greek Orthodox Church in Chicago and transformed it into their headquarters temple, Mosque Maryam. By 1974 the Nation had either a temple/mosque or study group in every US state and in the District of Columbia. Relations with law enforcement remained strained; in 1972, a policeman was shot and killed during a search of a NOI mosque in Harlem. The group continued to face opposition from the FBI, which engaged in a renewed counterintelligence project to destabilize it from the late 1960s. Strained relations also persisted with other American Muslim groups, which increasingly condemned the Nation as un-Islamic. This sometimes brought direct conflict; in 1973, NOI members killed seven of Hamaas Abdul Khaalis' Hanafi Muslims.

=== Wallace Muhammad and the NOI's transition to Sunni Islam ===
In 1975, Elijah Muhammad died and was succeeded by his son, Wallace D. Muhammad. Launching what he called the movement's "Second Resurrection", Wallace Muhammad rejected many of the Nation's idiosyncratic teachings and increasingly aligned the group with Sunni Islam. "Temples" were renamed "mosques", while "ministers" were renamed "imams". The Fruit of Islam was disbanded. Black nationalism was abandoned, and the ban on white people joining the Nation was lifted. Wallace nevertheless retained a focus on raising the status of black people, inviting African Americans to call themselves "Bilalians" after the 7th-century African Muslim, Bilal ibn Rabah.

In November 1976, the Nation was renamed the World Community of al-Islam in the West and in April 1978 it was renamed again, becoming the American Muslim Mission. Wallace Muhammad claimed that these changes were in accordance with his father's intentions, and that Fard Muhammad had established the NOI to gradually introduce African Americans to Sunni Islam. Most mosques accepted Wallace Muhammad's reforms but some rejected them, establishing small splinter groups in Detroit, Atlanta, and Baltimore. In 1985, Wallace Muhammad disbanded the American Muslim Mission, telling his followers to affiliate instead with their local mosques.

=== Louis Farrakhan's revival ===
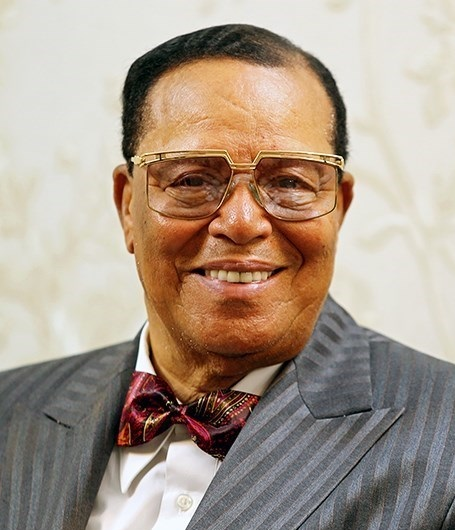
Louis Farrakhan, who re-established the Nation of Islam after leaving Wallace Muhammad's group in 1977

Leading the opposition to Wallace Muhammad's reforms was Louis Farrakhan, who, with other disaffected members, began rebuilding the Nation of Islam in 1977. Born in the Bronx to Caribbean migrants, Farrakhan had become minister of the NOI's Harlem Temple in 1964 and a national representative in 1967.

Farrakhan presented himself as Elijah Muhammad's true successor. His reconstituted NOI spent the first several years rebuilding, re-establishing the Fruit of Islam, and buying much of its predecessor's property, including the Chicago Palace. In 1979, Farrakhan launched a newspaper, The Final Call, which by 1994 had a circulation of 500,000. In 1981, Farrakhan's Nation held its first convention, and its membership began to increase rapidly in the mid-1980s. Farrakhan's Nation expanded its international network by building links in Africa, seeking a closer relationship with Muslims globally, and opening its first British mosques in the 1990s.

Farrakhan added further novel developments to the Nation's teachings; Masonic elements and numerology came to play an important part in his speeches. He claimed that in 1985, while at Tepotzotlán in Mexico, he was teleported aboard the Mother Plane spaceship and there met with Elijah Muhammad—who was not really dead—to discuss the Nation's future. During the 1990s, Farrakhan was introduced to the Church of Scientology, and in 2010 he publicly embraced Scientology's system of Dianetics, encouraging NOI members to undergo auditing from the Church. Farrakhan also expanded his social outreach projects; in 1989 he launched a campaign against gang violence, playing a key role in getting two of the country's largest gangs, the Bloods and the Crips, to sign a 1992 ceasefire. Farrakhan also organized the 1995 Million Man March through Washington, D.C., which constituted the largest black demonstration in US history.

== Beliefs ==
=== Theology ===
The NOI has a highly distinct and detailed theology. Although professing a monotheistic belief in a single God, its discourse refers to multiple gods, meaning that it can be interpreted as polytheistic. In the NOI's view, each Allah (God) is not an incorporeal spiritual entity but a flesh-and-blood person, one that takes the form of a black man. In Nation teaching, the Allahs are not immortal, instead typically living for around 200 to 300 years, after which a new God will take over from their predecessor. The Nation regards its founder, Fard Muhammad, as the latest of these Allahs, or "God in person". The Nation teaches that although this founder disappeared in 1934, he would live for another 409 years.

God is a man and we just cannot make Him other than a man, lest we make Him an inferior one; for man's intelligence has no equal in other than man. His wisdom is infinite; capable of accomplishing anything that His brain can conceive.

— Elijah Muhammad, Message to the Black Man, 1965

Reflecting a belief in the inner divinity of humanity that is common among North America's black-oriented new religions, the Nation also promotes the idea that "God is man and man is God, that God has a presence inside human individuals." Accordingly, the NOI teaches that the black race is divine, a "nation of Gods". The NOI maintains that by following its teachings, adherents can recognize their inner godliness. In doing so, it stipulates, black people will also recognize that they have psychic powers; Elijah Muhammad, for instance, claimed telepathic abilities.

According to the scholars of religion Ana Belén Soage and Jason Eric Fishman, the Nation of Islam's theology is "completely divorced" from that of mainstream Islam. In the latter, God is a single, monotheistic entity, one that is eternal and non-anthropomorphic; Islam also stresses that there is a fundamental ontological divide between humanity and God, which is at odds with NOI teaching. Similarly conflicting with mainstream Islam is the NOI's belief that there is no afterlife; Elijah Muhammad wrote that "when you are dead, you are dead". Notions of Heaven, the Nation claims, are a lie used by white Christians to keep black people docile. Instead, Elijah Muhammad taught that there is no spiritual realm beyond the material universe.

=== Cosmogony and the Tribe of Shabazz ===
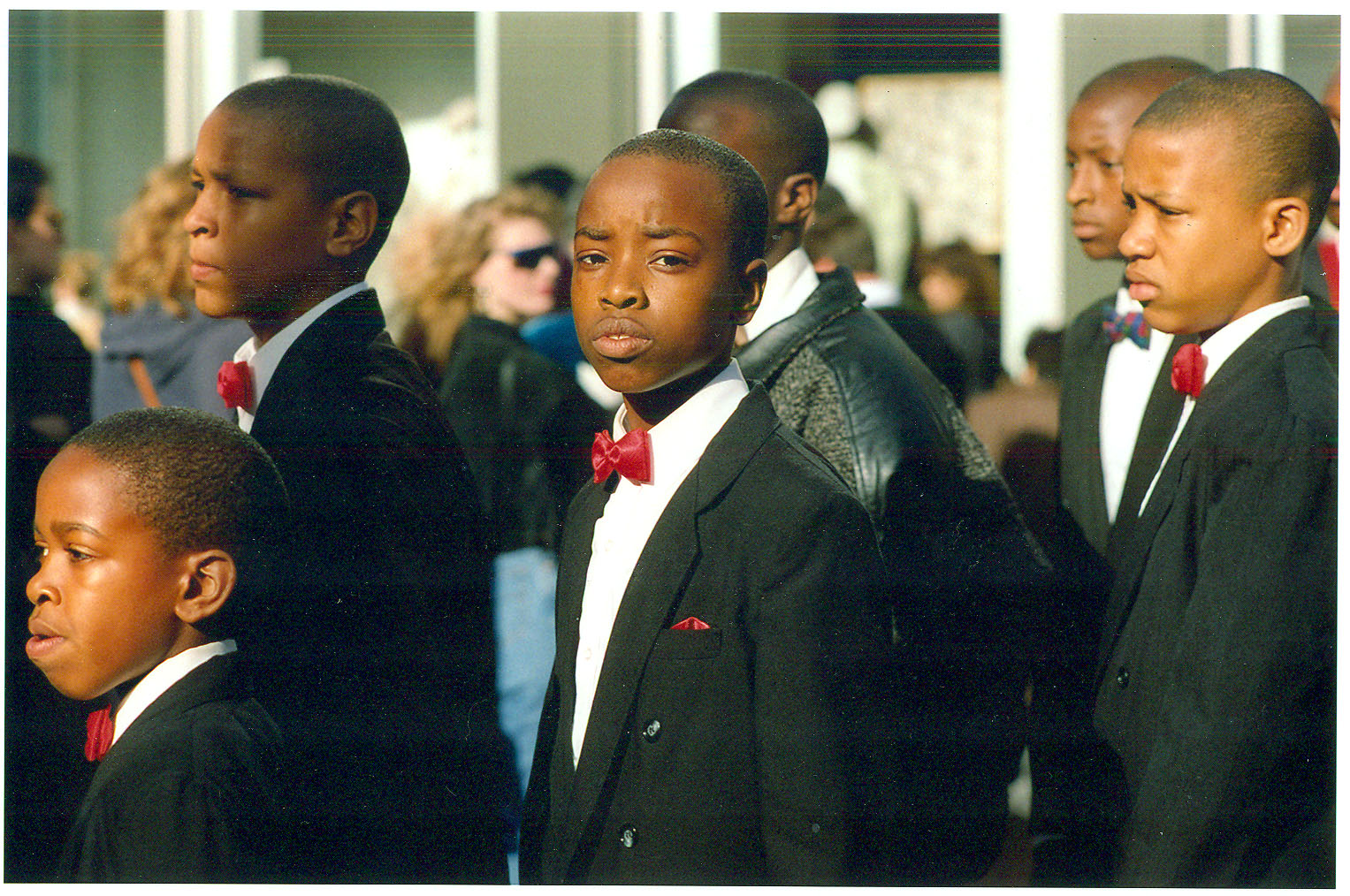
Young members of the Nation of Islam in San Francisco in the 1990s

The Nation teaches that in the beginning, there was nothing but darkness. Then, 76 trillion years ago, the first Allah willed himself into being, taking 6 million years to form into his desired appearance: that of a black man. The first Allah then created the Sun and the planets, as well as fellow black gods, who lived predominantly on the Earth but also on Mars. Of these, the first Allah and 23 others formed a council of ruling imams: 12 greater and 12 lesser.

The NOI refers to these early individuals as "god-scientists". They are part of what it calls the "Original" or "Asiatic" race, a people who were divided into 13 tribes. The Nation labels these people "black", describing them as having dark skin as well as smooth, straight hair. In portraying humanity as the creation of the first Allah, rather than a product of evolution, the Nation endorses a unique form of creationism. According to Nation teaching, one of the god-scientists was a renegade and, 66 trillion years ago, tried to destroy the Earth with explosives. The resulting explosion forced a chunk of the Earth's mass into orbit, where it became the moon. One of the 13 tribes was trapped on the moon, where they died due to a lack of water.

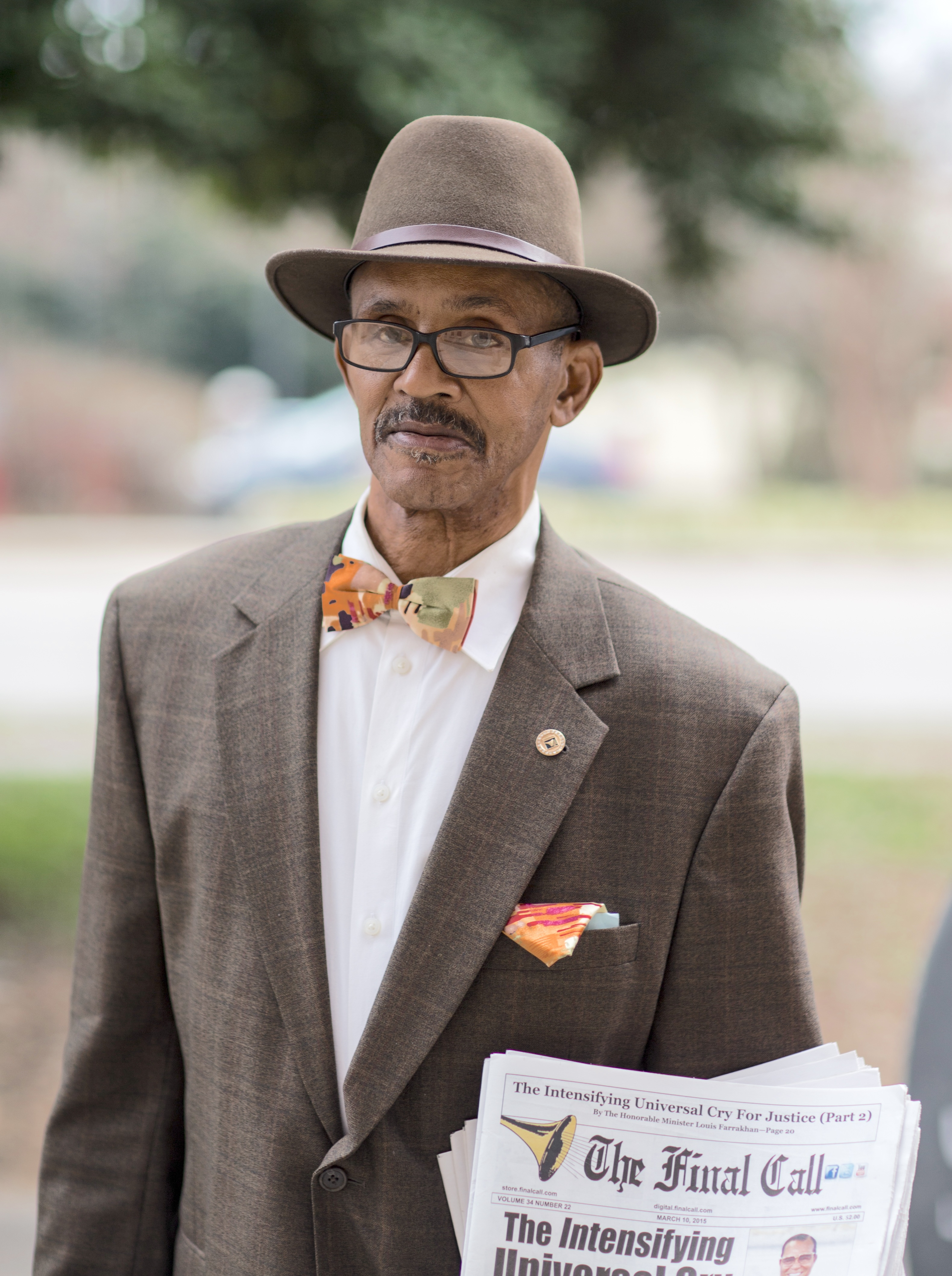
A member of the Nation, selling the group's newspaper, in 2015

Of the 12 tribes that remained on Earth, the most resilient was the Tribe of Shabazz, who settled in Egypt's Nile Valley and the area around Mecca in the Arabian peninsula. The Nation calls this region "East Asia", reflecting its belief that Asia and Africa were once a single continent. It was because they moved into the "jungles of East Asia" (i.e., Africa), Elijah Muhammad claimed, that members of this Original Asiatic Race developed Afro-textured hair. The Nation teaches that the members of this Original Race were Muslims by nature, but that many created heretical deviations, such as Hinduism.

For the Nation, everyone not of West European ancestry is a descendant of the Original Asiatic Race. In contrast to understandings of race held by most Americans, for the Nation, "black" does not simply mean those of Sub-Saharan African descent, but all people of color, including Asians, North Africans, and Native Americans. Even some Europeans, such as Muslim majority Albanians, are considered descendants of the Original Asiatic Race. Elijah Muhammad, for instance, referred to "black, brown, yellow [and] red" people as collectively constituting "black mankind", which he then juxtaposed against the "white race".

=== Story of Yakub ===
The white race is not equal with darker people because the white race was not created by the God of Righteousness[...] Yakub, the father of the devil, made the white race, a race of devils[...] The white race is not made by nature to accept righteousness. They know righteousness, but they cannot be righteous.

— Elijah Muhammad, Our Savior Has Arrived, 1974

The NOI teaches a story about a figure known as Yakub. The story received its fullest exposition in Elijah Muhammad's 1965 book Message to the Blackman in America. In this narrative, Yakub was a black scientist; a child prodigy, by the age of 18 he had learned everything that Mecca's universities had to teach him. He attracted a following but caused trouble, leading the Meccan authorities to exile him and his 59,999 followers to Pelan, the Mediterranean island of Patmos.

On Pelan, the NOI claims, Yakub engaged in a selective breeding program to create the white race. This entailed breeding new children, with those who were too dark killed at birth and their bodies fed to wild animals or incinerated. Over several centuries, Yakub's experiments created a blonde, light-skinned people, the white race. The Nation maintains that most white people are unaware of their true origins, but that such knowledge is held by senior white Freemasons. The NOI teaches that, as a group of people distinct from the Original Asiatic Race, the white race is degenerate, sub-human, bereft of divinity, and intrinsically prone to lying, violence, and brutality. Elijah Muhammad repeatedly referred to whites as "the devil". Various academic commentators have characterized these views as racist.

According to the Nation, Yakub's new white race sowed discord among black people, and thus were exiled to live in the caves of "West Asia", meaning Europe. In this narrative, it was in Europe that the white race engaged in bestiality; their attempts to restore their blackness resulted in the creation of apes and monkeys. To help the whites develop, the ruling Allah sent prophets to them, the first of whom was Musa (Moses), who taught the whites to cook and wear clothes. According to the Nation, Jesus was also a prophet sent to civilize the white race. The group rejects the Christian beliefs that Jesus was a unique manifestation of God; that he was the Messiah; that he was the product of a virgin birth; and that he was crucified and resurrected.

=== White rule and antisemitic conspiracism ===
God say you're the real devil. And you damn sure are. Ain't another devil nowhere else. Ain't no use you get mad with me, white people. You are the devil. The only hell-raiser on the earth. I'm not sayin' that you are responsible, 'cause you are made devil. But I'm not gonna make a mistake in thinkin' that you can be made better through love.

— Louis Farrakhan's views on white people being the devil

The NOI teaches that the ruling Allah permitted the white race to rule the Earth for 6000 years, a period which ended in 1914. It maintains that the ruling Allahs allowed this so that black people would discover humanity's inner potential for evil and learn how to defeat it, thus enabling them to realize their inner divine capacity.

During the era of white rule, the Nation states, the whites enslaved the Tribe of Shabazz, shipping many of them to the Americas. The NOI claims that most enslaved blacks forgot their true names, their Arabic language, and their Muslim identity, instead embracing Christianity, which the Nation labels "white man's religion". The Nation claims that in their enslaved state, black people began engaging in sinful behavior such as fornication and drinking alcohol, something encouraged by the whites. The group interprets many of the problems facing African Americans in this framework; Farrakhan for instance claimed that the white establishment encouraged a black gang culture to provide an excuse for the police killing of black youths, that they flooded black-majority areas with drugs, and that they created AIDS to exterminate black people. In making this argument, the NOI equates the United States with the city of Babylon, which the Christian Bible presents as a symbol of oppression.

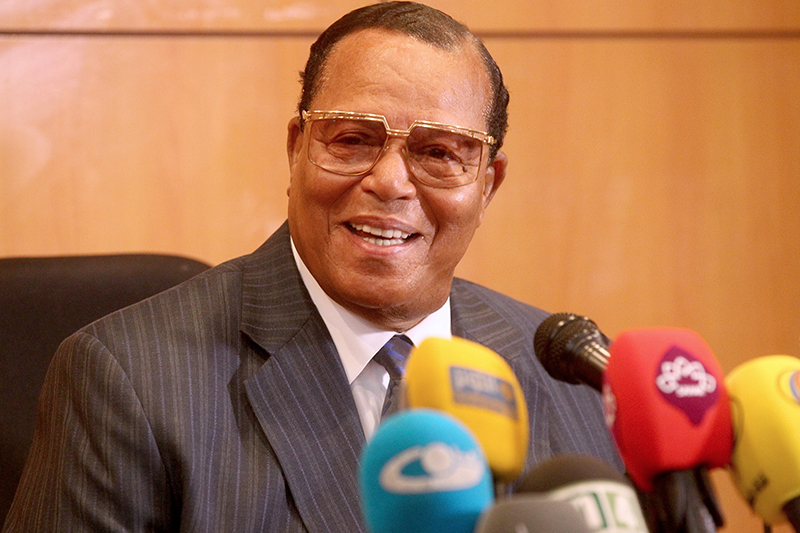
Farrakhan on a 2016 visit to Tehran, Iran; Farrakhan has repeatedly been accused of antisemitism

Elijah Muhammad suggested that Orthodox Jews, by following the laws set down by Moses, had raised themselves to a higher spiritual level than most white people. Subsequently, Farrakhan and his NOI have repeatedly been accused of antisemitism. Farrakhan promoted antisemitic tropes about a Jewish cabal controlling the US government, banking systems, universities, and entertainment sector. Elsewhere, Farrakhan called Judaism a "dirty religion", and described Adolf Hitler as a "very great man". Other senior figures have also made antisemitic statements. NOI representative Khalid Abdul Muhammad referred to the "Jew-nited Nations" in "Jew York City", while NOI health minister Abdul Alim Muhammad accused Jewish doctors of injecting blacks with AIDS. The group has also espoused the claim that Jews were disproportionately responsible for the Atlantic slave trade, and has embraced an anti-Zionist position regarding Israel.

=== Eschatology and the Mother Plane ===
The NOI is millenarian. Central to its view of the apocalypse is a large spaceship, known as the Mother Plane, the Mother Ship, or the Wheel, which Elijah Muhammad described as "a small human planet". The Nation teaches that this vessel is the Merkabah that appears in the book of Ezekial. It maintains that Fard Muhammad—as Allah—and many of his scientists live aboard the Mother Plane; Farrakhan has claimed that Elijah Muhammad never died but is resident aboard this ship. The Nation teaches that there are also smaller vessels, "baby planes", docked inside the Mother Plane that travel to Earth.

NOI members have repeatedly claimed that this apocalypse is imminent; in the early 1960s, Elijah Muhammad was predicting that it would occur in 1965 or 1966, Farrakhan later stated that the Gulf War of 1990 would spark it, while Tynetta Muhammad thought it would occur in 2001. According to Nation teaching, the apocalypse will come when the Mother Plane appears above the Earth and transports the righteous to live aboard it. It will then use the baby planes to bury bombs beneath the Earth's surface, which, on detonation, will wipe out the old, white-dominated order. The NOI has taught that the white ruling elite are aware of this forthcoming apocalypse and that the US exploration of space and the Strategic Defense Initiative are futile attempts to protect themselves from the Mother Plane.

According to this account, after the bombs explode, the Earth's atmosphere will burn for 390 years and spend another 610 years cooling down. Once the Earth is again habitable, the ruling Allah will return the righteous to the planet, in a new black paradise. In his book The Supreme Wisdom, Elijah Muhammad claimed that after the apocalypse, "Peace, joy and happiness will have no end," with residents of this perfect society eating the finest food and wearing silk clothes interwoven with gold.

=== Black nationalism and separatism ===
Black racial unity is the foundational aspiration of the NOI's black nationalist ideology. The group seeks to empower black people by purging ideas they may have of white superiority and black inferiority. Instead, it maintains that the black race is superior and the white race inferior. The Nation is also black separatist, rejecting the integration of black and white people. This racial separatism put the NOI at odds with the civil rights movement of the 1950s and 1960s. The Nation was critical of African American activists who promoted racial integration, such as Martin Luther King Jr. and the National Association for the Advancement of Colored People (NAACP), calling them "Uncle Tom Negroes".

We want our people in America whose parents or grandparents are descendants from slaves to be allowed to establish a separate state or territory of their own, either on this continent or elsewhere. We believe that our former slave masters are obligated to provide such land and that the area must be fertile and minerally rich.

— Elijah Muhammad, 1965

As compensation for the unpaid labor of their enslaved ancestors, the NOI has called for the creation of a sovereign African American nation state in the Southern United States. Elijah Muhammad stipulated that the US should financially support this new country for 20 to 25 years. Farrakhan also suggested that the countries of Africa should set aside land on that continent for the African diaspora, characterizing this as a reparation for the complicity of West African states in the Atlantic slave trade.

Rejecting Pan-Africanism, the NOI focuses on African Americans rather than emphasising links between Africa and the African diaspora. Elijah Muhammad stated that "where as [sic] the Black man in Africa is our brother, our central responsibility is with the Black man here in the wilderness of North America". The NOI's origin myths present Mecca, not Africa, as the original home of African Americans, and its writings portray Africa itself as the least desirable of the Original Asiatic lands. The scholar of religion Michael Muhammad Knight argued that Elijah Muhammad "upheld white supremacist tropes" about African cultures. Muhammad, for instance, complained of Africans' "savage dress and hair styles", adding that it was the Nation's job to "civilize Africa".

=== Gender and sexuality issues ===
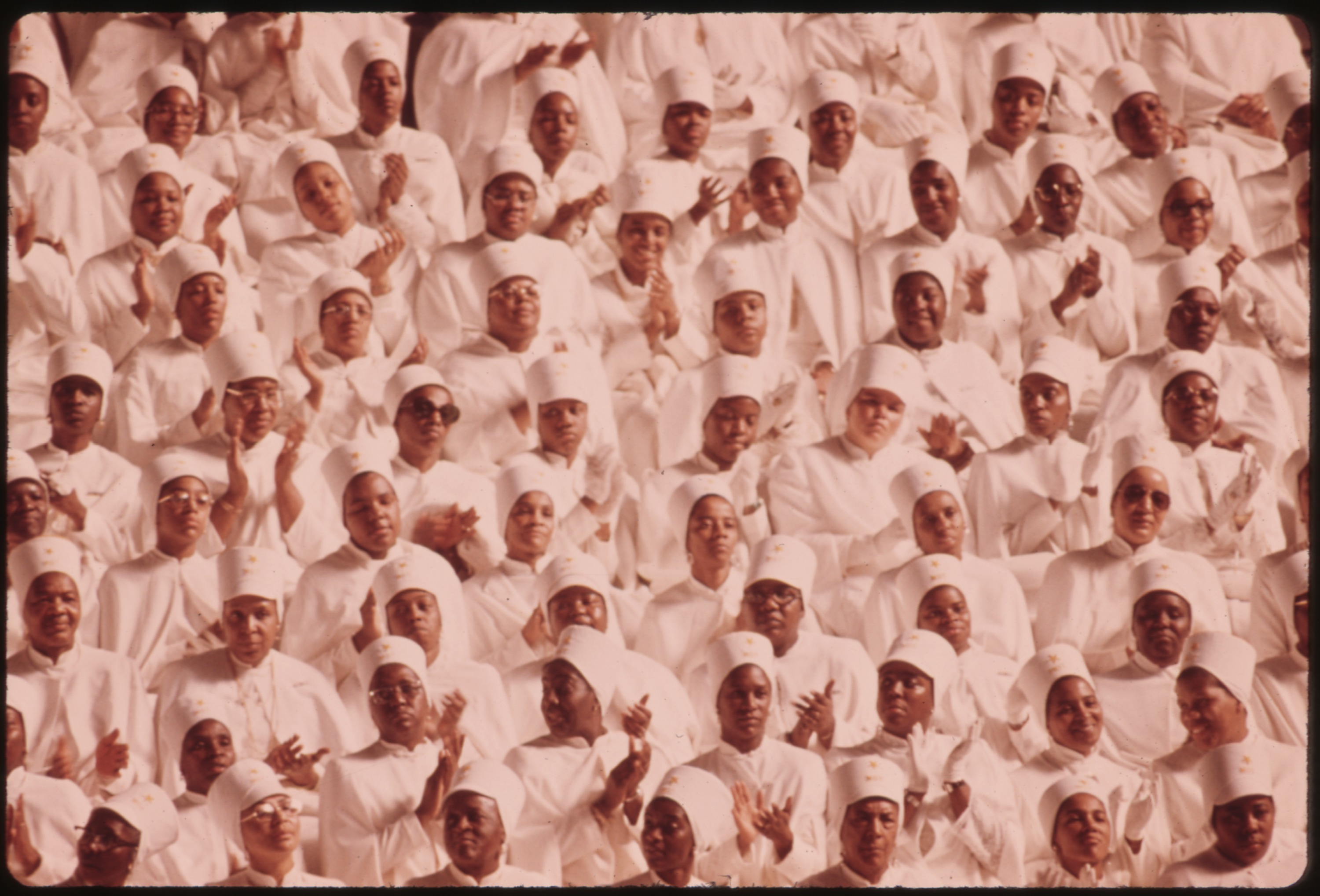
Female members of the NOI at a Saviours' Day meeting in 1974. A women's outfit incorporating a headpiece and full-length garment covering the arms and legs was introduced in the 1930s, intended to preserve the wearer's modesty.

The NOI's teachings on gender are conservative and patriarchal. Emphasis is placed on the family unit; the group is critical of the matrifocal focus of many African American families, instead stressing the importance of a male family figurehead. The group holds to conservative household gender roles: men are encouraged to be economic providers for their family, while women are to be caretakers of the household and children. Outsiders often perceive the Nation's women as victims of male oppression, and some ex-NOI women have disclosed a repressive atmosphere in the group.

The NOI's leadership is overwhelmingly male. Despite this, Clara Muhammad led the group while Elijah Muhammad was incarcerated between 1942 and 1946, and during the 1990s, several women rose to senior positions. In 1998, the Nation appointed its first woman minister, Ava Muhammad, as head of Mosque Number 15 in Georgia. Women have also been allowed leadership in the Muslim Girls Training group and in the NOI's schools and businesses.

The NOI enforces heterosexual monogamy and encourages sexual abstinence prior to marriage. Despite the group's formal opposition to polygyny, Elijah Muhammad had sexual relations with multiple women, whom Farrakhan has called his "wives"; the group states that this was permitted because Elijah was God's messenger. Nation members are encouraged to wed other members, although marriage to non-members is permitted. The NOI stipulates that followers should only marry other black people, although this includes Indigenous, Latine, and African Americans. Marrying whites is taboo, with the group claiming that sex with white women emasculates black men.

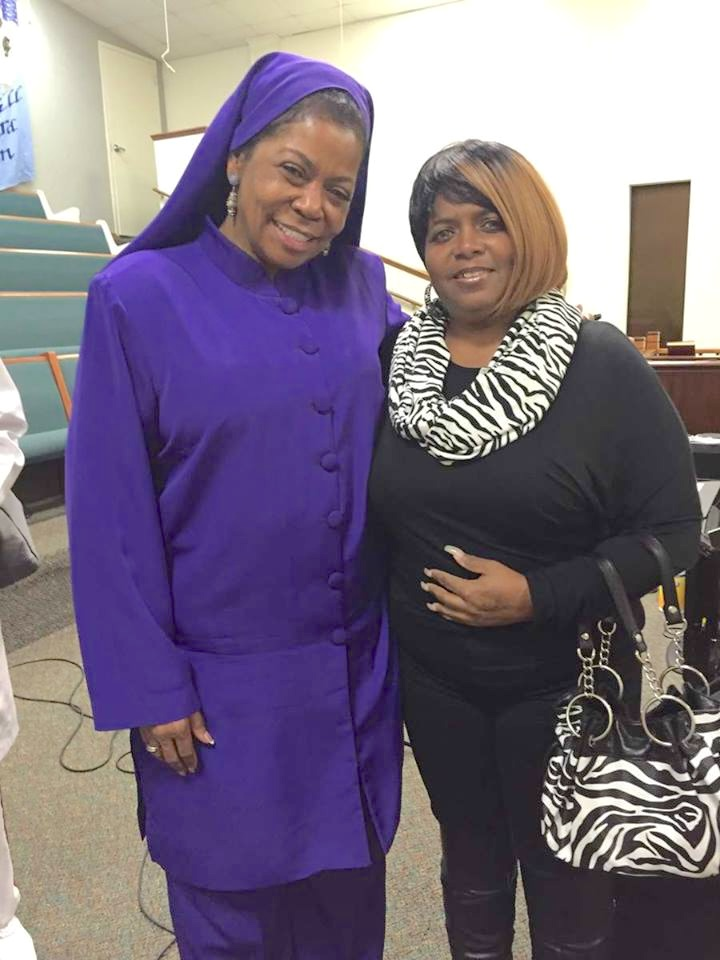
Ava Muhammad (left, photographed in 2014) was the NOI's first female minister.

Men and women are discouraged from forming friendships with each other. Instead, members seeking to court each other are expected to inform the captain of their local Fruit of Islam or Muslim Girls Training branch about their intentions. Men found to have beaten their wives are temporarily suspended from Nation membership. Divorce is discouraged but not forbidden. NOI members are encouraged to have children, with Farrakhan also encouraging adoption. Children are expected to study hard, avoid street culture, and respect their elders.

The Nation views birth control as the white establishment's attempt to lower the black birthrate, although it does not prohibit it. Farrakhan has expressed support for abortion in cases of rape, incest, and when the pregnant woman's life is endangered. Same-sex relationships are condemned as immoral. Elijah Muhammad complained that schools, jails, and prisons were "breeding dens of homosexuals," while Farrakhan banned gay men from his Million Man March, bringing accusations of homophobia.

== Practices ==
=== Services, prayer, and celebration ===
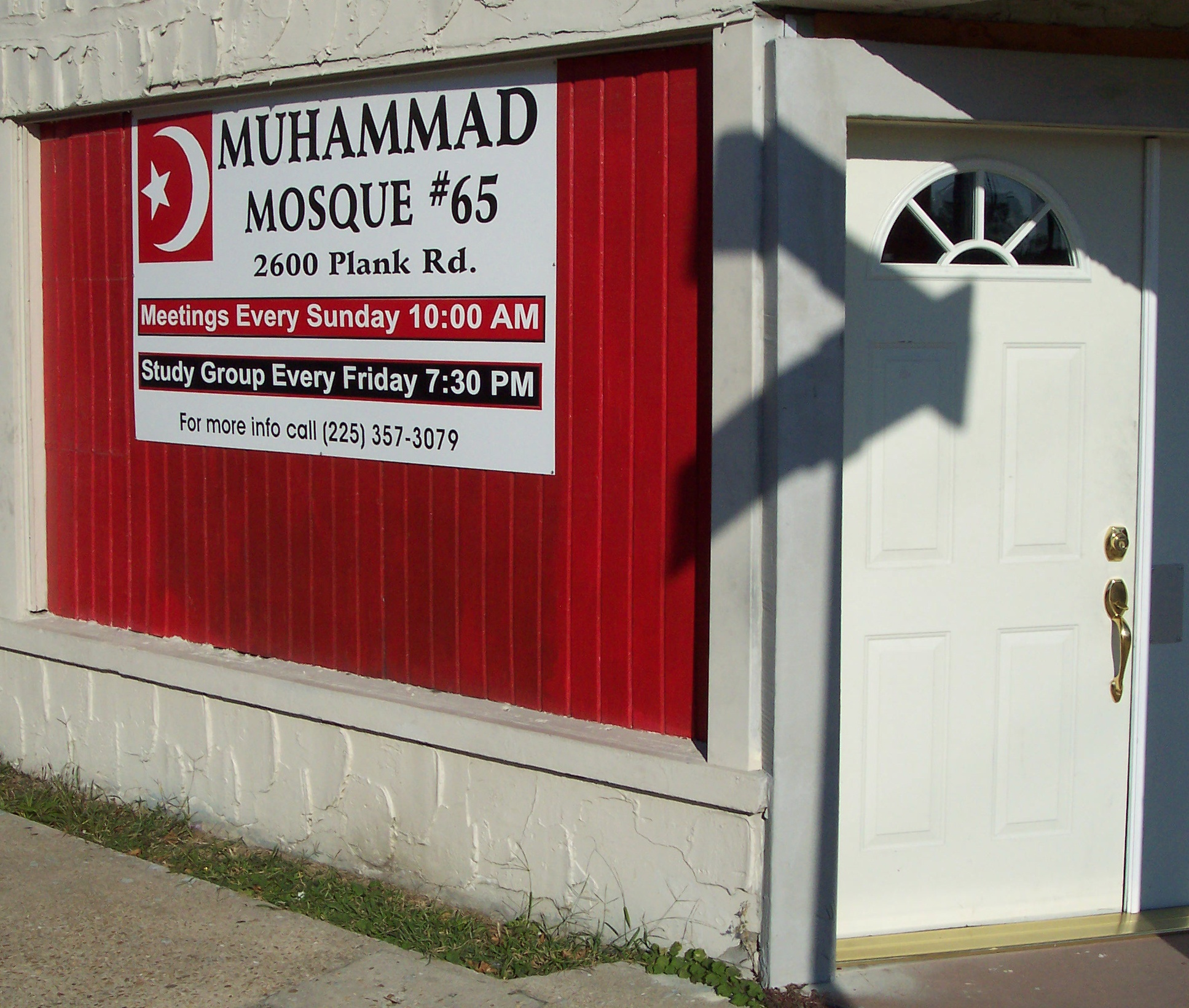
A Nation of Islam mosque in Baton Rouge, Louisiana, United States in 2005

During the 1960s and early 1970s, the NOI's places of worship were called both temples and mosques, although the latter term was favored under both Wallace D. Muhammad and Farrakhan. These were numbered in order of their foundation. As well as their religious function, NOI mosques can also serve as community centers, banks, schools, and child-care facilities. The mosque leader is called a captain and will be a member of the Fruit of Islam subgroup.

Those attending services will sometimes be searched by members of the Fruit of Islam or the Muslim Girl's Training group, who look for weapons and discouraged objects like cosmetics and cigarettes. Attendees are then seen to their seats, usually rows of benches. The sexes are segregated: women on the right and men on the left. The tone of Nation services is sombre and quiet. Services typically begin with the statement "As-salamu alaykum" (peace be upon you), with the congregation responding "Wa 'alaikum As-salam" (and also upon you). The congregation will pray together, the Nation's "national anthem" may be played, and a minister will provide a lecture and sometimes read verses from either the Bible or Quran.

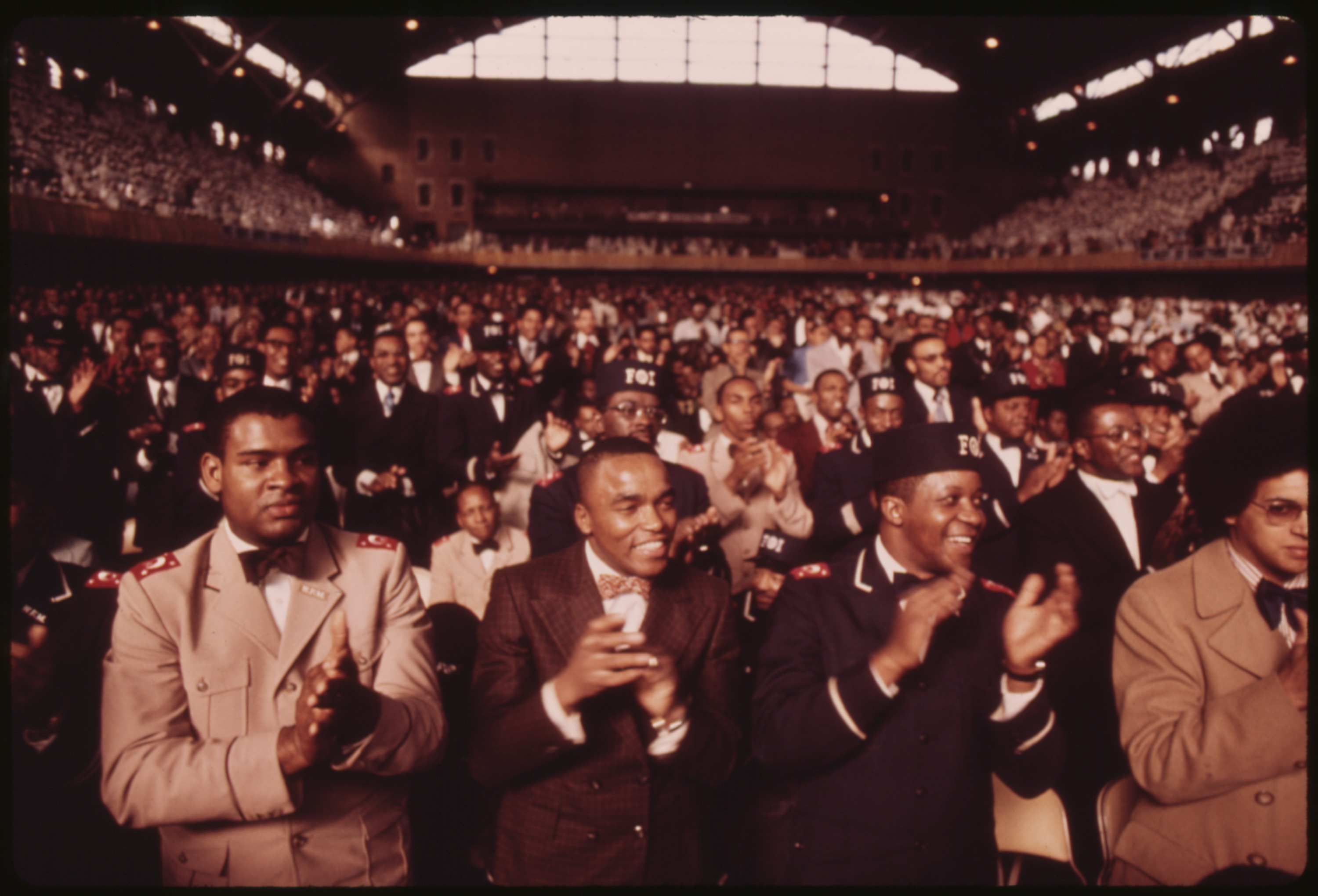
Members of Nation of Islam applaud during Elijah Muhammad's annual Saviors' Day message in Chicago in 1974.

In the late 1950s, Elijah Muhammad published a prayer manual outlining how his followers should pray five times a day. This involved an ablution beforehand, typically involving washing the hands, face, and ears, symbolically associating physical cleanliness with the broader purification of the body. Women cover their heads while praying. Elijah Muhammad stipulated that prayers should be in English but commented that, in the future, he would explain how to pray in Arabic. In later articles, he explained that his followers should face towards Mecca as they pray, symbolizing their journey toward the restoration of black greatness.

The most important date in the Nation's year is February 26, Saviours' Day, which members believe is Fard Muhammad's birthday. This is the date on which the organization holds its annual national convention. Under Farrakhan, the Nation introduced a second annual Saviours' Day, on October 7, to mark the birth of Elijah Muhammad. In the 1990s, Farrakhan's Nation also introduced an annual event called the World's Day of Atonement or Holy Day of Atonement, held over the course of October 15 and 16; this is characterized by fasting, prayer, and reconciliation. In addition to marking festivals, NOI members are encouraged to make the hajj pilgrimage to Mecca; Elijah Muhammad himself did so three times.

=== Lifestyle ===
As a declaration of mental emancipation, the Nation requests that members change any names inherited from white slave-owners. This is not necessary if the new member has a name that is African in origin. In the NOI's early years, Fard Muhammad bestowed new names on followers for a $10 fee. During the mid-20th century the Nation began encouraging the use of "X" as a surname, symbolizing an African American's identity as an "ex-slave" and providing a marker for their lost ancestral name. As this results in many individuals having the same name, numbers are added before the X to differentiate members (i.e. "Charles 2X", "Charles 3X").

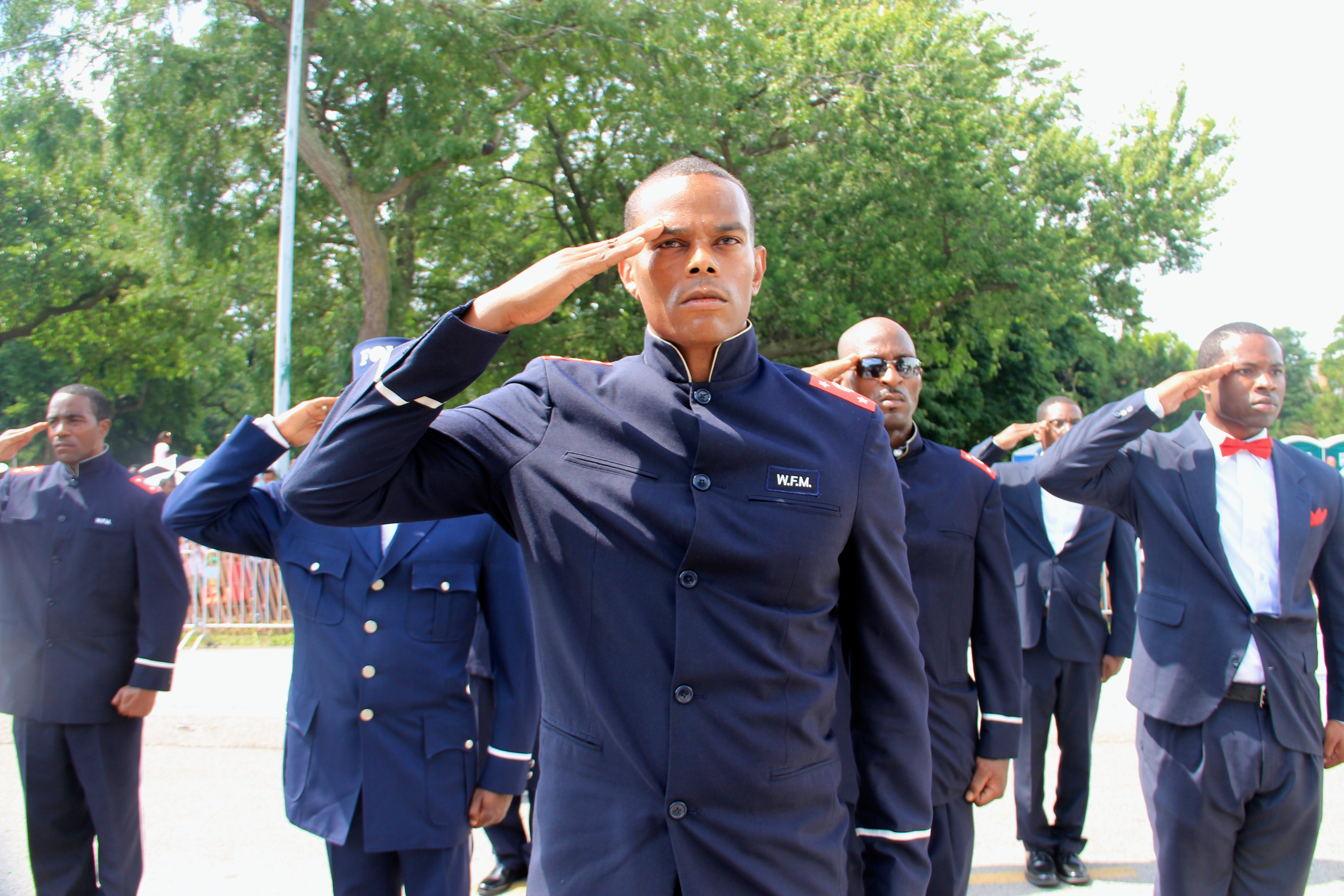
Members of the Fruit of Islam at Chicago's Bud Billiken Parade in 2015

The NOI encourages followers to live highly disciplined and structured lifestyles. Members are expected to obey the law, to seek gainful employment, to always be punctual, to avoid buying on credit, and to never gamble. They are also urged not to rely on state welfare payments, with the Nation arguing that these undermine the African American community's ability to be self-sufficient.

Male members typically cut their hair short, sometimes shaving the head entirely, and do not usually wear beards. They are expected to wear suits with ties or bowties; those who are part of the Fruit of Islam wear military-style uniforms, sometimes accompanied by a fez. Women are commanded to dress modestly; they are not permitted to wear trousers, are expected to wear long sleeves, and are encouraged to cover their heads. Cosmetics and the chemical or heat-based straightening of hair is also discouraged.

==== Dietary requirements ====
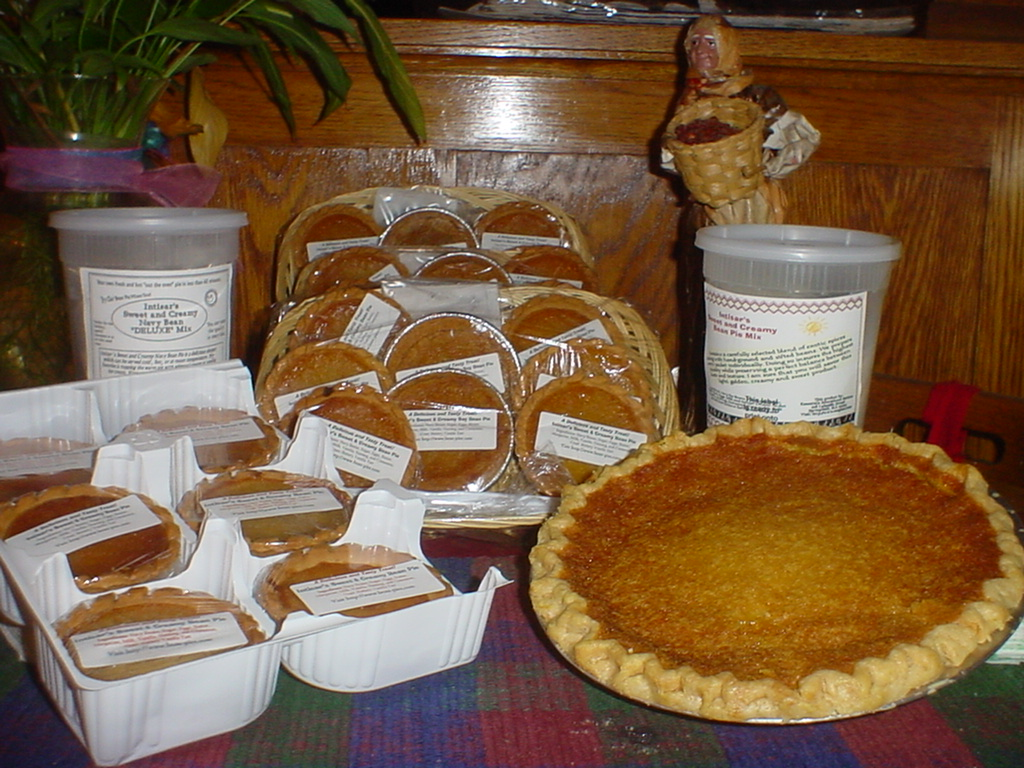
Bean pies are associated with the Nation and Elijah Muhammad encouraged their consumption.

The NOI teaches that practitioners should keep fit and eat healthily, as part of which it espouses strict dietary rules. These were outlined by Elijah Muhammad, who claimed to have received them from Fard Muhammad.

Vegetarianism is encouraged, although not obligatory, with Elijah Muhammad writing that "meat was never intended for man to eat". In How to Eat to Live, Elijah Muhammad urged his followers to subsist primarily on fruit, vegetables, and certain grains, and to choose lamb if they must eat meat. Pork is forbidden on the grounds that pigs are deemed unclean. Other discouraged foods include dried fruits, white flour, additives, and fast food. Although its own produce is not wholly organic, the Nation is supportive of organic food and the avoidance of genetically modified crops, insecticides, and pesticides.

The NOI also encourages followers to avoid foods associated with the slave culture of the US, such as cornbread, catfish, and collard greens, deeming this cuisine to be undignified and unhealthy. Concerned about obesity and diabetes among African Americans, Elijah Muhammad urged his followers to restrict their caloric intake, ideally by eating only one meal a day. He claimed that those who ate only once every 24 hours would live for 150 years and that those who ate once every seven days would live for 1,050 years. Members are also encouraged to conduct regular three-day fasts, and to fast during the daylight throughout December. The NOI also prohibits the use of alcohol, tobacco, and recreational drugs. In addition, it advises that followers avoid vaccines, typically deeming them part of a white conspiracy to deplete populations of color.

=== Economic and educational independence ===
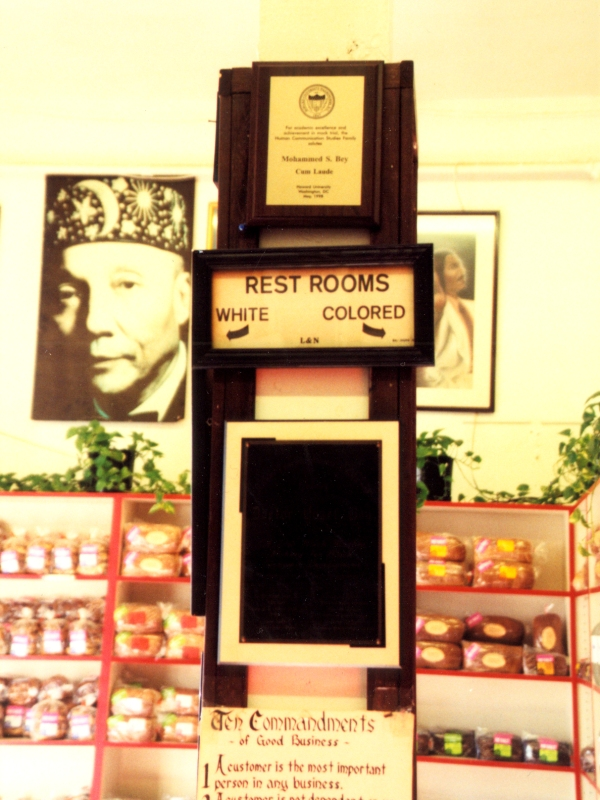
The interior of a Nation-owned bakery in Oakland, California

Espousing economic nationalism, the Nation follows earlier thinkers like Booker T. Washington and Marcus Garvey in emphasizing African American infrastructure as a means of community empowerment. The Nation has created many companies, including the Salaam restaurant chain, the Shabazz bakeries, the Fashahnn Islamic clothing range, the Clean 'N Fresh skin and haircare products, and Abundant Life Clinics. These businesses provide income for the NOI and help address African American unemployment.

Since the 1980s, the Nation has sought government contracts, and in 1988, it established the Security Agency Incorporated to provide Fruit of Islam patrols for clients. In 1985 it launched its POWER (People Organized and Working for Economic Rebirth) project, designed to redirect black purchasing power toward black-owned businesses. It also seeks African American economic advancement through individual achievement; various women members have created their own businesses, sometimes run from the home. While the Nation's African American anti-capitalist critics have derided the group's economic approach as black capitalism, Farrakhan has responded that capitalism is the only feasible road to African American economic empowerment.

The Nation prioritizes land ownership to increase food production and African American autonomy, using the slogan: "the farm is the engine of our national life." It established a farm in White Cloud, Michigan in 1947, and by the early 1970s owned 20,000 acres of farm land in Michigan, Alabama, and Georgia. In 1991, Farrakhan's Nation launched its Three Year Economic Savings Plan, asking followers to send them $10 a month over three years, money that would collectively allow the group to buy more farmland. As a result, in 1994 it purchased 1,556 acres near Bronwood, Georgia, there establishing Muhammad Farms. Much of the produce grown there is distributed to NOI mosques around the country. The NOI hopes to establish a system of black-owned farms through which to feed 40 million black people, with the stated aim of providing at least one healthy meal a day for every African American. NOI members also own urban gardens in various US cities.

The NOI is highly critical of the US school system, believing that it perpetuates white supremacy, and so has established its own educational system. This includes Muhammad Universities of Islam; most of these are elementary schools, although a few also offer secondary education. These emphasize science, mathematics, black history, Arabic, and NOI doctrine; Farrakhan has said that the Nation needs to provide black children with "an education to make them Gods". In these schools, boys and girls are taught separately; pupils receive two weeks of vacation each year. Combating the idea that academic achievement entails "acting white", the Nation has sought to associate hard work in school with pride in being black.

=== Civic engagement ===
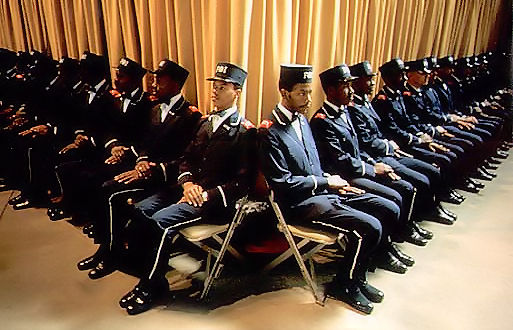
Members of the Fruit of Islam in 1974

The Nation has long been involved in civic, economic, and political activities. In African American-majority neighborhoods, the NOI has engaged in door-to-door campaigns to raise awareness about pollution, provided services that public institutions do not, and used Fruit of Islam patrols as a community watchdog—especially to stop drug-dealing. These efforts have earned praise from within the broader African American community.

Although the scholar of religion Stephen C. Finley maintained that the NOI is "first and foremost a religious community," it does formulate political demands. The NOI has nevertheless urged its members to avoid electoral politics; Elijah Muhammad instructed them not to vote. Later, Farrakhan backed Jesse Jackson's 1984 campaign to become the Democratic Party's presidential candidate, and in 1990 three NOI candidates stood for election in the US. Although many outsiders have presumed the NOI to be a revolutionary movement, it has not sought to foment political revolution or violent social change, instead focusing on shifting the consciousness of its members, encouraging personal moral improvement, family building, and economic productivity.

== Organization ==
=== Leadership and financing ===
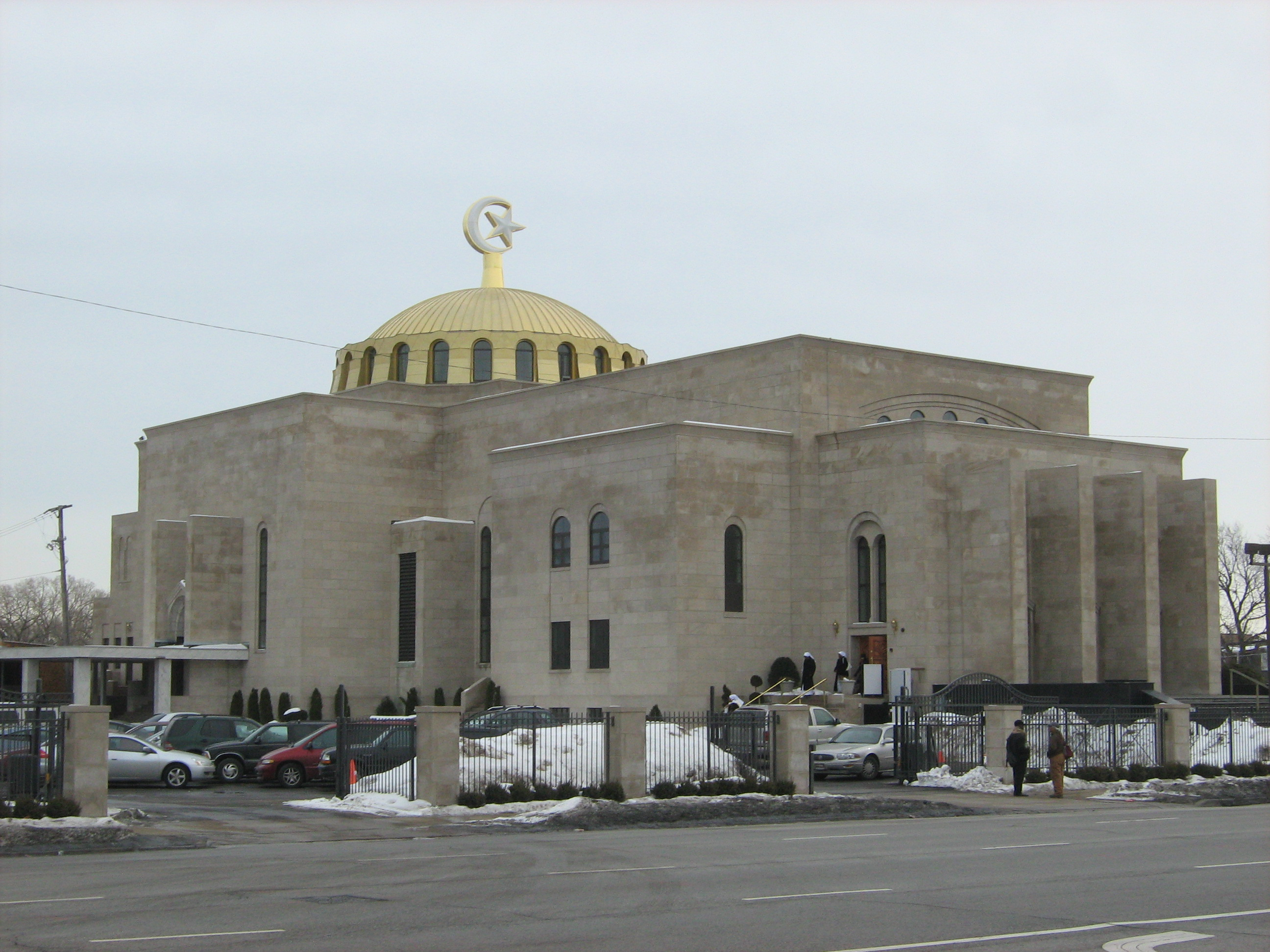
Mosque Maryam in Chicago, the headquarters of the Nation of Islam

Headquartered at Mosque Maryam in Chicago, the Nation is highly hierarchical. By the 2020s, it was governed by an executive council of 13 members, potentially alluding to the original 13 tribes of humanity in NOI belief. It also maintains ten ministries: for Spiritual Development, Agriculture, Education, Information, Health, Trade and Commerce, Defense, Justice, Arts and Culture, and Science and Technology. During its history it has also operated a shadow ministry, forming the prototype for the governance of the future state it hopes to lead. Within the group's senior ranks, family ties are important; various members of Elijah Muhammad's family were married to members of Farrakhan's family.

Responsible for the group's security is the supreme captain, one of the organization's most powerful roles. Security is provided by the Fruit of Islam, a group of men trained in military protocol, wrestling, boxing, and judo. Expected to strictly follow the Nation's rules, the Fruit protect NOI leaders, temples/mosques, and other NOI property. The Nation also runs its Muslim Girls Training, whose members receive lessons in domestic skills and self defense.

Funding for the NOI's operations come primarily from donations and its businesses. At the start of the 1960s, it was reported that members were expected to donate a set part of their earnings to the group each year; as of 1952, this reportedly constituted a third of a member's income. In 1976, Wallace Muhammad estimated the Nation's net worth to be $46 million, although revealed it had a severe cash flow problem, owed millions in back taxes to the Internal Revenue Service, and was making a loss with its agricultural operations. Although the Nation does not disclose the extent of its financial resources, in the 1990s its assets were estimated to total $80,000,000.

=== Press and media ===
From its early days, the Nation promoted its ideas through print media, issuing the magazines Muhammad Speaks and The Final Call. Muhammad Speaks—which was published from 1961 to 1975—included contributions not only from Nation members, but also from various African American leftists. Members were encouraged to sell these magazines on street corners or door-to-door in African American neighborhoods. These sellers were given sales quotas to fulfil and were sometimes punished if they failed to meet them. The Nation's first magazine for women, Righteous Living, appeared in the early 1990s. Other media outputs have included radio shows, videos, and websites and social media accounts.

=== Domestic and international affiliations ===
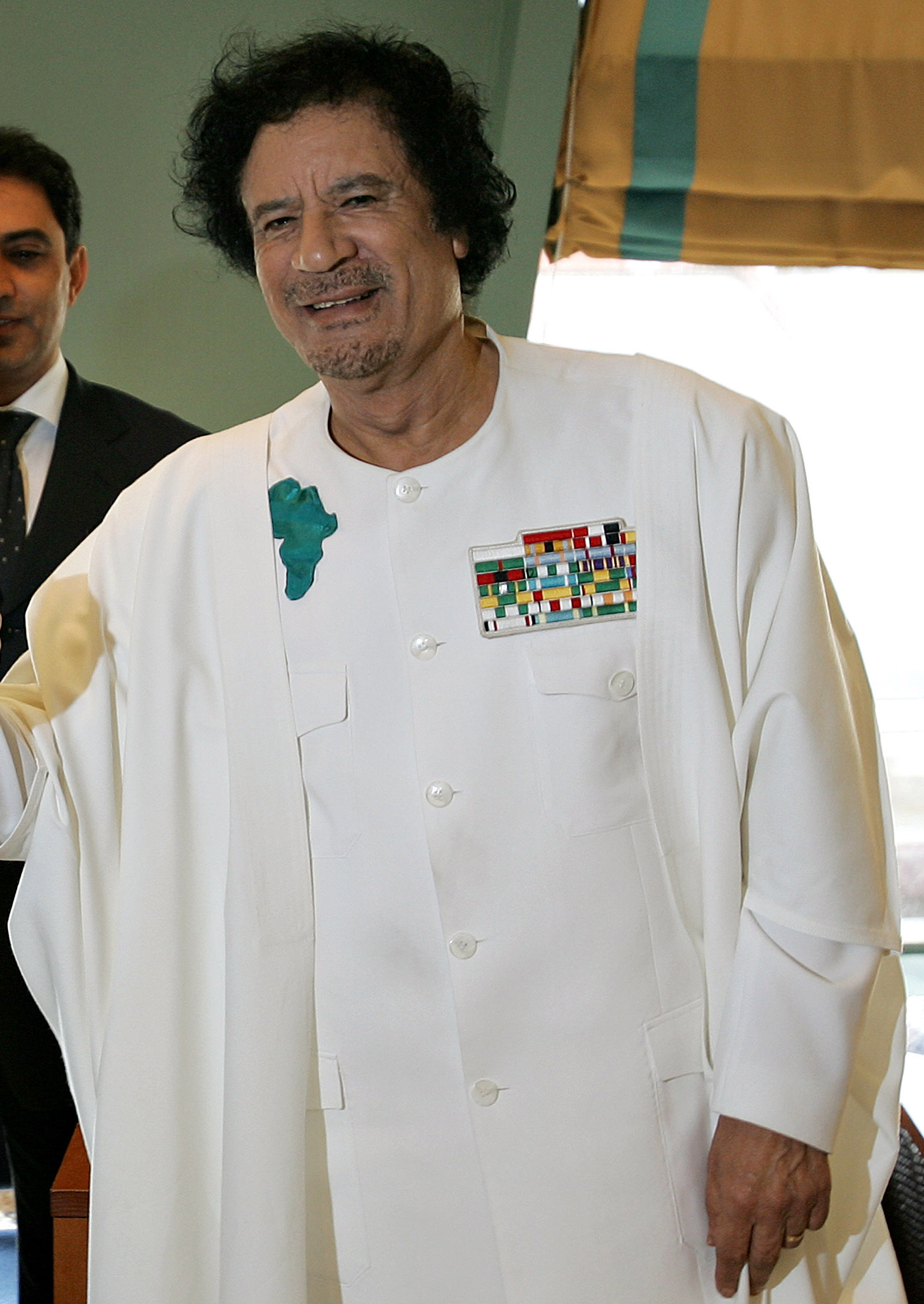
Muammar Gaddafi was the Nation's most prominent international supporter; Farrakhan stated that "we will always love him, admire and respect him and stand up and speak on his behalf".

In the 1930s and 1940s, the Nation had links with the Japanese Satokata Takahashi, whom Elijah Muhammad declared was teaching that "the Japanese were brothers and friends of the American Negroes". During the Second World War, in which the US fought Japan, many Nation members expressed pro-Japanese sentiment and refused to fight people they regarded as fellow members of the Original Asiatic Race. The Nation has remained critical of "US aggression" towards countries with non-white or Muslim majorities.

Under Elijah Muhammad, the Nation established relations with various Muslim countries. In 1957, Malcolm X organized a conference on colonialism attended by delegates from Egypt, Iraq, Sudan, and Morocco, while Elijah Muhammad met with Egyptian President Gamal Abdel Nasser in 1959 and the Libyan leader Muammar Gaddafi in 1972. For many years, Gaddafi was the Nation's most prominent international supporter. His government gave the Nation a $3 million interest-free loan in 1972 to purchase its Chicago South Side center, and another $5 million interest-free loan in 1985 to fund its black enterprise program. It later offered Farrakhan's Nation $1 billion, which the US government sought to block. Farrakhan visited Ghana and Libya in 1985, later embarking on a larger international tour in 1996, meeting with Gaddafi, Ghana's Jerry Rawlings, Nigeria's Sani Abacha, South Africa's Nelson Mandela, and Iraq's Saddam Hussein, and also attending annual celebrations of the Iranian Revolution in Tehran.

Like Garvey's UNIA, the Nation built links with white nationalist and other far-right white groups because of their shared belief in racial separatism. Malcolm X revealed that the Nation had met with Ku Klux Klan (KKK) and American Nazi Party (ANP) representatives; the ANP's leader George Lincoln Rockwell spoke at the Nation's 1962 Savior's Day rally in Chicago. Links with the white far-right continued under Farrakhan, with Tom Metzger of the White Aryan Resistance donating money to the Nation in 1985, and links also being established with the British National Front during the 1980s. By the 1990s, the Nation collaborated with the far-right LaRouche movement as part of their shared opposition to the US-led Gulf War. These links have not prevented some white far-right opposition to the NOI; in 1993 the Fourth Reich Skinheads were revealed to have plotted to kill Farrakhan.

== Demographics ==
In their testimonies of "What Islam Has Done for Me," most believers offered personal narratives about what life was like before conversion to Islam, how they came to convert, and what happened to them as a result. These moving tales often included the stories of how ex-convicts, drug addicts, and sexually promiscuous men and women came to find pride, self-esteem, dignity, good health, a sense of peace and security, a happy marriage, and gainful employment as a result of their conversion.

— Historian Edward E. Curtis IV

The Nation does not publish the size of its membership, and there have been no censuses to determine a reliable number. Under Fard Muhammad's leadership, membership reached a total of approximately 8,000, and by 1960 it was estimated at between 30,000 and 100,000. In 2007, the scholar of religion Lawrence A. Mamiya suggested that membership stood at around 50,000. At various points, the Nation has had a high member turnover; many members have left the group, sometimes becoming Sunni Muslims.

While based in the US, the Nation has also established either a presence or influence among African diasporic communities elsewhere; in 2006, the scholar Nuri Tinaz suggested that the Nation "may have" up to 2,000 members and sympathisers in the United Kingdom. Despite focusing on African Americans, since Elijah Muhammad's era it has also sought to recruit Latino and Native Americans. As of 2009, Latinos were estimated to comprise over 20 percent of the Nation's membership, although some complained of facing ethnic prejudice within the organization.

In its early decades, the Nation's appeal was strongest in poor African American neighborhoods, but over the course of the 20th century its membership became increasingly middle-class. The scholar of religion Mattias Gardell attributed this to the Nation's focus on hard work and rigid morality, which helped improve the economic situation of its members, coupled with the broader growth of the African American middle class in this period. He also believed that the changing class composition, and with it a less hostile attitude to white-dominant society, assisted the 1970s shift to Sunnism under Wallace Muhammad.

=== Conversion ===
The NOI refers to its proselytising efforts as "fishing for the dead". To this end, it holds open meetings, mass rallies, street-corner lectures, and prison outreach, and has used books, radio broadcasts, and audio-recorded speeches to promote its message. Through this, it has sought to attract unemployed, disenchanted black youth, with its recruitment efforts proving particularly effective among drug addicts and incarcerated criminals.

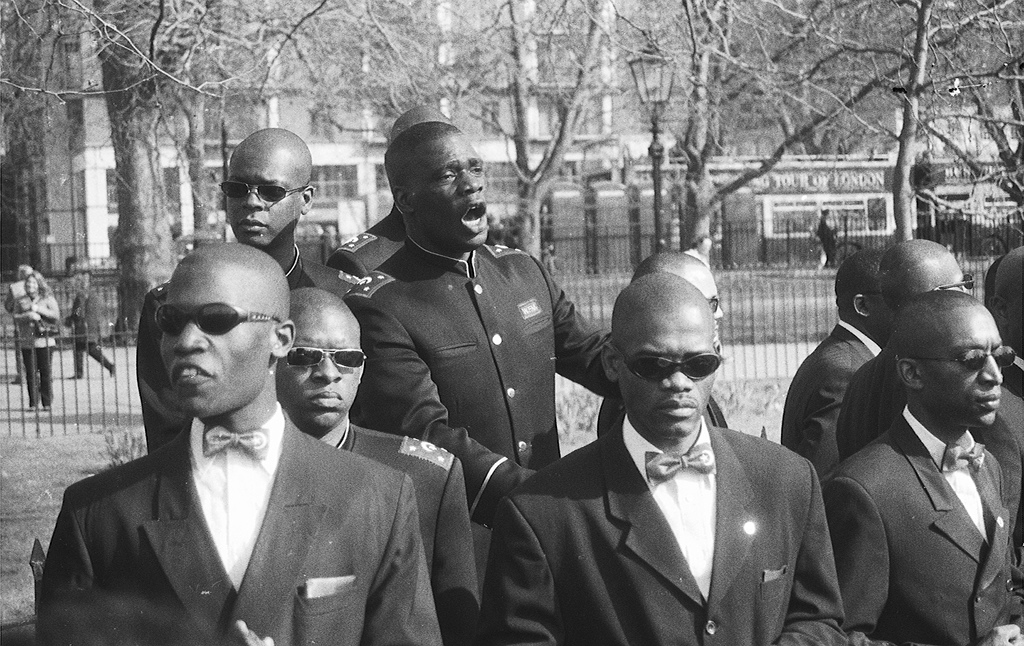
Nation of Islam members proselytising at Speakers' Corner in Hyde Park, London in 1999

The Nation was active in prison ministry by the 1950s, with its numbers of imprisoned followers rising steadily in the latter part of that decade; among these imprisoned recruits was Malcolm X. Farrakhan stepped up the prison ministry in the 1980s. By the early 1960s, prison authorities were raising concerns that the NOI was exacerbating racial tensions in prisons. Some incarcerated members have reported discriminatory treatment from prison authorities because of their religion, and have sometimes responded with legal action.

Various motivations have led people to join the Nation. The historian Zoe Colley thought that the NOI appealed to men living in poverty by offering them the "opportunity to reclaim their manhood and sense of pride", with some members reporting that joining helped them overcome low self-esteem or depression. Ula Y. Taylor, a scholar of African American studies, suggested that female members were attracted by the Nation's offer of a "stable family life" and the opportunity to assist "the development of a new black nation". The Nation also attracted followers with its offer of a separate schooling system where African American children would not suffer the racism found in public schools.

== Reception and influence ==
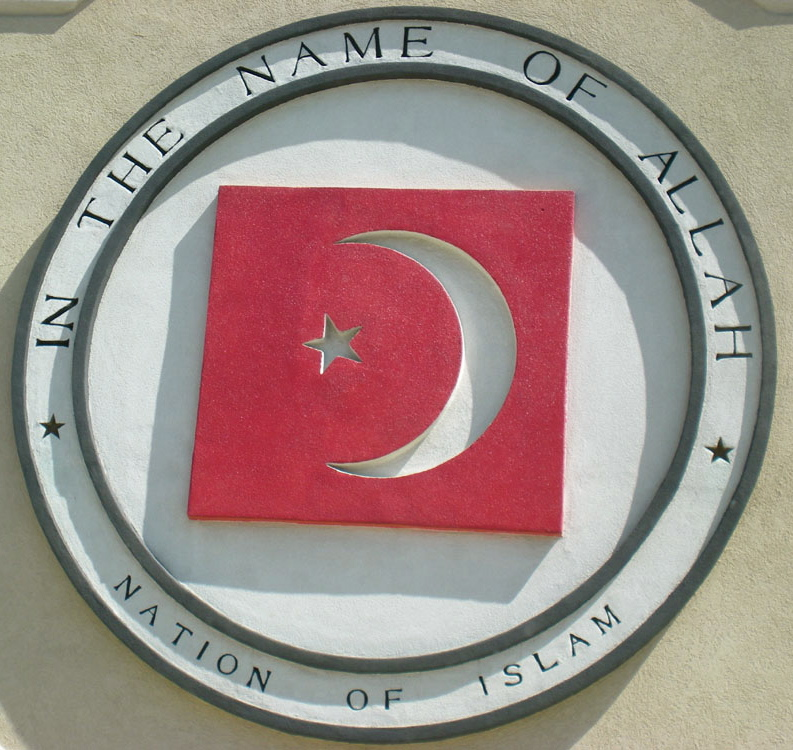
The logo of the Nation on its property in Indianapolis, Indiana

The sociologist of religion David V. Barrett called the NOI "one of the most visible and controversial black religions", while Gardell termed it the "most renowned and controversial" of the African American Muslim groups. According to the black studies scholar Malachi D. Crawford, the NOI became "perhaps the most influential African American religious community in the twentieth century".

Various groups have broken from the Nation, including Clarence 13X's Five-Percent Nation, Silas Muhammad's Original Nation of Islam, and Solomon Muhammad's United Nation of Islam. The NOI has also influenced the development of other religions, including the Nuwaubian Nation, whose founder, Dwight York, claimed that Elijah Muhammad had heralded his own arrival. Influences from the NOI have also been argued for the Word of Faith movement.

Despite reticence from the Nation itself during much of its history, the group has been the subject of much scholarly attention. Initial research, largely undertaken by historians and sociologists in the late 1950s and 1960s, was often hostile or dismissive; research influenced by disciplines like religious studies and gender studies followed later.

=== Cultural impact ===
The black studies scholar Priscilla McCutcheon noted in 2013 that although the NOI remained comparatively small, it had "a wide discursive reach". By the 1990s, its influence among black youth was far larger than its membership, being evident among hip hop and rap artists like Public Enemy, Ice Cube, Kam, The Skinny Boys, and Sister Souljah. The Nation has cultivated a sense of pride among many African Americans, and its role in confronting gang violence, drugs, and poverty within African American communities has earned it respect. The sociologist A.A. Akom opined that the NOI had a reputation among African Americans of "speaking truth to power"; a 1994 Time/CNN poll found that two-thirds of African Americans who knew of Farrakhan viewed him favorably. Similarly positive assessments of the Nation have been observed among Britain's black communities.

Other black, as well as non-black people, have criticized the Nation. Critics have characterized Fard Muhammad as a petty criminal who swindled his followers, accused the group of stirring up anti-white racial hatred, and maintained that the NOI's teachings are illogical and irrational. Scientists have labeled the group's mythological accounts as pseudoscience. Most mainstream American Muslim groups have distanced themselves from the NOI, as have smaller Muslim groups like the Ahmadiyya, typically maintaining that Nation members are not true Muslims. Elijah Muhammad countered by claiming that the "Old Islam" of his critics was "led by white people", while Farrakhan responded by accusing the Islamic world of racism and sectarian violence.

Civil rights groups have also criticized the Nation; the NAACP's Roy Wilkins labeled it a "hate group", while the Southern Poverty Law Center accused it of promoting an "innate black superiority over whites" and having a "lengthy record of antisemitism, homophobia, and connections to prominent white supremacists". The NOI has also been accused of antisemitism by groups like the Anti-Defamation League, an organization that has placed the group under surveillance, lobbied against it, and attempted to block its enterprises. Four Jewish organizations withdrew their sponsorship of the Parliament of World Religions when it invited Farrakhan to speak, while Jewish student groups have picketed Farrakhan's speeches on university campuses. Far-right Jewish groups have gone further; the Jewish Defense League organized a 1985 "Death to Farrakhan" march, while the Jewish Defense Organization included Farrakhan on its kill list.
