= Muslim Girls Training =

Training program

Muslim Girls Training & General Civilization Class (MGT & GCC) is the all-female training program of the Nation of Islam. It is often considered to be the counterpart for girls and women to the Fruit of Islam. Louis Farrakhan as head of the Nation of Islam is over MGT & GCC and appoints the MGT & GCC National Sister Captain.

== History ==
The Muslim Girls Training & General Civilization Class is one of the institutions established in 1933 by Wallace Fard Muhammad, founder of the Nation of Islam. He also established the University of Islam schools and the Fruit of Islam in that year before vanishing in 1934. As the Nation of Islam sought to reshape the Black Muslim identity in America, so too did these classes aim to create a new identity for women in the Nation. MGT & GCC classes operated under the belief that white America was corrupting Muslim women's natural grace and wisdom. Classes are generally held at least once a week. MGT & GCC schools existed throughout much of the United States, including in New York, Detroit, Chicago, and Philadelphia, many remaining till today.

== Organizational structure ==
The MGT & GCC classes were organized much like the military: at the top position was the Sister Captain, followed by lieutenants, secretaries, and squad leaders. The leadership ran practices to demonstrate being a proper Muslim woman, which included teaching about motherhood, proper dress and behavior, and relationships. The classes were meant as a way to purity, protect, and support Muslim girls and women, promising shelter from the devil and wicked non-believers.

Sister Captains

Serving at the top of the hierarchy of the MGT & GCC, were routinely monitored by Elijah Muhammad during the time of his life. Sister Captains are the primary figure of authority within the affairs of women of the National of Islam; and they were, and remain to be their job to hold the women within their respective communities to the standards recognized by Elijah Muhammad's.

== Ideology ==
The students were expected to follow a set of fifteen mandates drawn from the ideology of the Nation of Islam. They include forbidding behaviors such as consuming alcohol, adultery, marrying outside of the faith, and inappropriate dress. Inappropriate dress was mainly characterized as that which is tempting to men, including form-fitting or revealing clothes, makeup, and high heels. The classes were developed to teach domestic duties like cooking and nutrition, sewing, cleaning, housekeeping, child bearing, religious instruction, and personal hygiene. The main themes present throughout the teachings of MGT & GCC classes include modesty, abstinence, and being a proper mother and wife.
