= Islam Alijaj =

Swiss politician and activist (born 1986)

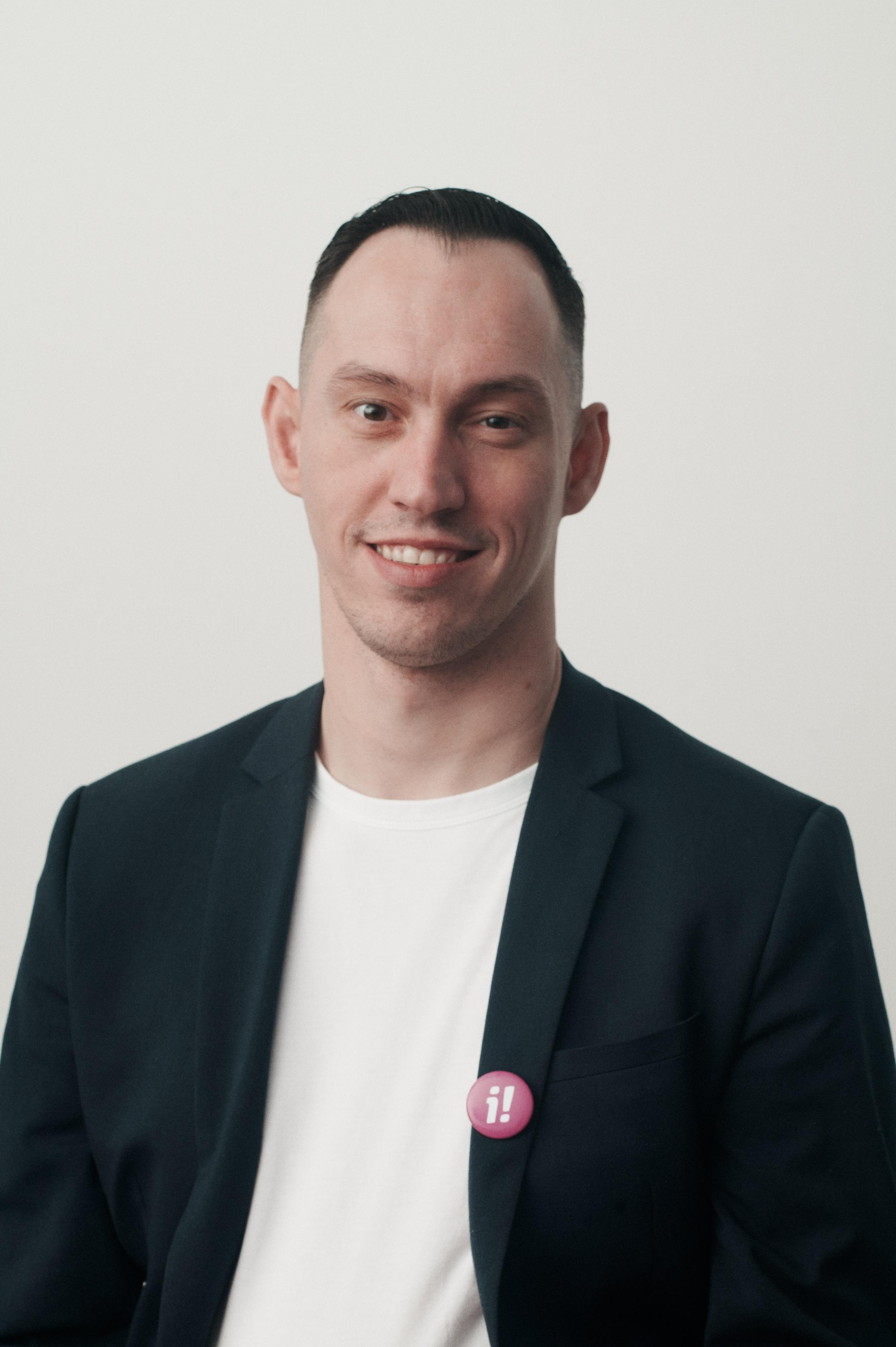
- Official portrait, 2023

Member of the National Council (Switzerland)
- Incumbent
- Assumed office 4 December 2023
- Constituency: Canton of Zurich

Personal details
- Born: Islam Alijaj; 18 June 1986 (age 40) Gjakova, FPR Yugoslavia (now Gjakova, Kosovo)
- Citizenship: Switzerland; Kosovo
- Party: Social Democratic Party
- Children: 2
- Occupation: Web developer
- Website: Official website

Islam Alijaj (Albanian pronunciation: [isˈlam ˈalijaj]; born 18 June 1986) is a Swiss disability activist and politician serves member of the National Council (Switzerland) for the Social Democratic Party since being elected in the 2023 Swiss federal election held on 23 October 2023. He assumed office on 4 December 2023. He previously served on the city parliament of Zurich since 2022.

== Life ==
Alijaj was born 1986 in Herec near Gjakova, FPR Yugoslavia (presently Kosovo). He has two younger and one older brother. His ethnically Albanian parents immigrated to Switzerland as seasonal workers in 1987 when he was one year old. In 2009, they founded a cleaning business which is currently known as Wischmobb Zürich GmbH (respectively Wischmobb Novo Holding AG) and employs 130+ people. His brother, Fatmir Alijaj, is the president of those companies.

He has cerebral palsy following a lack of oxygen at birth and therefore also suffers from speech problems. He attended a school for special needs followed by a commercial apprenticeship. Both the company that trained him and the disability insurance encouraged him not to continue his studies by passing a professional maturity, believing that he would have no chance on the ordinary job market. He then trained as a web3 developer.

He is married and has two children.
