= Islamul Ahsan =

Bangladeshi cricketer (born 1992)

Personal information
- Full name: Islamul Ahsan
- Born: 8 October 1992 (age 34); Patuakhali, Bangladesh
- Source: ESPNcricinfo, 2 January 2017

Islamul Ahsan (born 8 October 1992) is a Bangladeshi cricketer. He made his first-class debut for Barisal Division against Chittagong in the 2011–12 National Cricket League on 17 October 2011.
