= Sooraj Surendran =

Indian technologist and electronic engineer

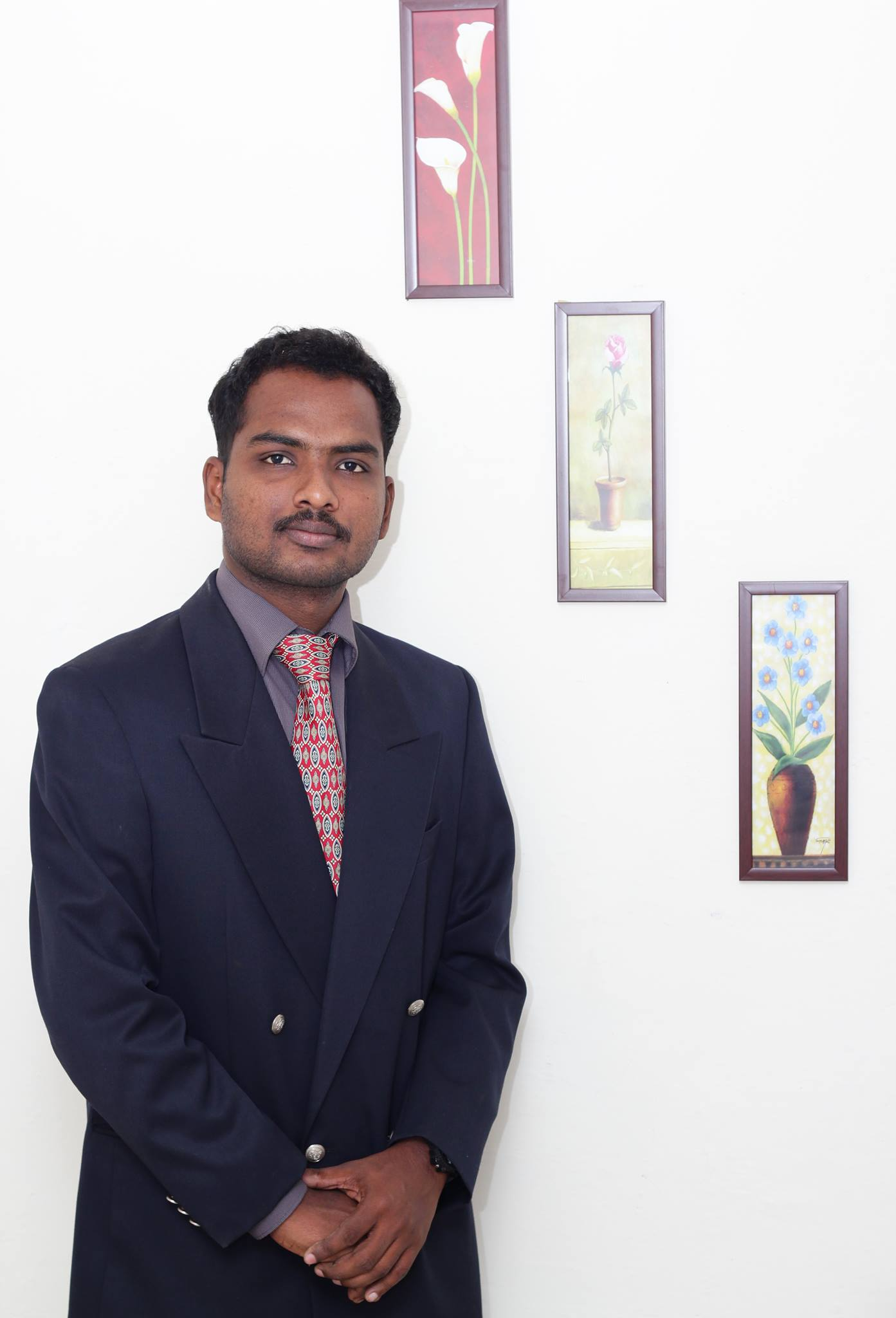
- Born: 5 June 1990 (age 36); Kollam, Kerala, India
- Education: B.E., Anna University
- Occupation: Engineer

Sooraj Surendran is an Indian technologist and electronic engineering graduate from Anna University. He has made significant contributions to motorized wheelchair deployment in Tamil Nadu.

== Early life and education ==
Surendran was born in Kollam, Kerala, India. His mother Sudha was a housewife and his father was K Surendran Pillai. He completed schooling in Sree Buddha, a Central Board of Secondary Education school in Karunagappalli, Kerala. He earned his degree from Anna University in electronic engineering.

== Career ==
Surendran graduated from Anna University with a BTech in electronic engineering in 2011. He worked on motorized wheelchair design and nursing care bed electronic unit design, and developed an electronic system for nursing care beds that integrated Bluetooth technology to control the functions of a nursing care bed via an Android application. Surendran was invited to help develop electronic control units for lightweight motorized wheelchairs as a part of a Tamil Nadu program to distribute motorized wheelchairs to 2,000 people.
