= Emergency department =

Medical treatment facility specializing in emergency medicine

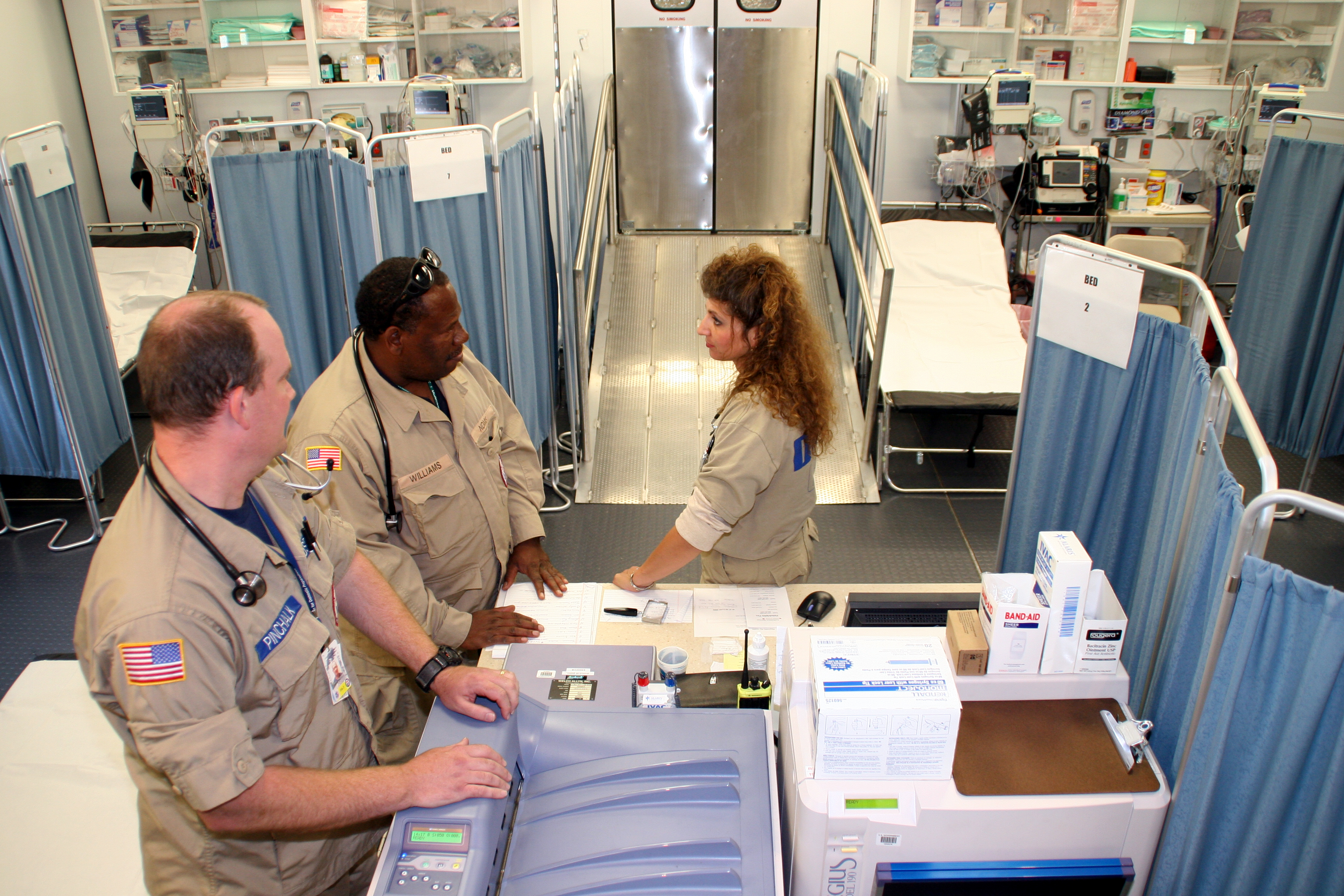
The main patient area inside the Mobile Medical Unit operated in Belle Chasse, Louisiana

An emergency department (ED), also known as an emergency room (ER), accident and emergency (A&E), or casualty, is a medical treatment facility specializing in emergency medicine, the acute care of patients who present without prior appointment; either by their own means or by that of an ambulance. The emergency department is usually found in a hospital or other primary care center.

Due to the unplanned nature of patient attendance, the department must provide initial treatment for a broad spectrum of illnesses and injuries, some of which may be life-threatening and require immediate attention. In some countries, emergency departments have become important entry points for those without other means of access to medical care.

The emergency departments of most hospitals operate 24 hours a day, although staffing levels may be varied in an attempt to reflect patient volume.

== History ==
Accident services were provided by workmen's compensation plans, railway companies, and municipalities in Europe and the United States by the late mid-nineteenth century, but the world's first specialized trauma care center was opened in 1911 in the United States at the University of Louisville Hospital in Louisville, Kentucky. It was further developed in the 1930s by surgeon Arnold Griswold, who also equipped police and fire vehicles with medical supplies and trained officers to give emergency care while en route to the hospital.

A hospital emergency entrance in Peachtree, North Carolina

Today, a typical hospital has its emergency department in its own section of the ground floor of the grounds, with its own dedicated entrance. As patients can arrive at any time and with any complaint, a key part of the operation of an emergency department is the prioritization of cases based on clinical need. This process is called triage.

Triage is normally the first stage the patient passes through, and consists of a brief assessment, including a set of vital signs, and the assignment of a "chief complaint" (e.g. chest pain, abdominal pain, difficulty breathing, etc.). Most emergency departments have a dedicated area for this process to take place and may have staff dedicated to performing nothing but a triage role. In most departments, this role is fulfilled by a triage nurse, although dependent on training levels in the country and area, other health care professionals may perform the triage sorting, including paramedics and physicians. Triage is typically conducted face-to-face when the patient presents, or a form of triage may be conducted via radio with an ambulance crew; in this method, the paramedics will call the hospital's triage center with a short update about an incoming patient, who will then be triaged to the appropriate level of care.

Most patients will be initially assessed at triage and then passed to another area of the department, or another area of the hospital, with their waiting time determined by their clinical need. However, some patients may complete their treatment at the triage stage, for instance, if the condition is very minor and can be treated quickly, if only advice is required, or if the emergency department is not a suitable point of care for the patient. Conversely, patients with evidently serious conditions, such as cardiac arrest, will bypass triage altogether and move straight to the appropriate part of the department.

The resuscitation area, commonly referred to as "Trauma" or "Resus", is a key area in most departments. The most seriously ill or injured patients will be dealt with in this area, as it contains the equipment and staff required for dealing with immediately life-threatening illnesses and injuries. In such situations, the time in which the patient is treated is crucial. Typical resuscitation staffing involves at least one attending physician, and at least one and usually two nurses with trauma and Advanced Cardiac Life Support training. These personnel may be assigned to the resuscitation area for the entirety of the shift or may be "on call" for resuscitation coverage (i.e. if a critical case presents via walk-in triage or ambulance, the team will be paged to the resuscitation area to deal with the case immediately). Resuscitation cases may also be attended by residents, radiographers, ambulance personnel, respiratory therapists, hospital pharmacists and students of any of these professions depending upon the skill mix needed for any given case and whether or not the hospital provides teaching services.

Patients who exhibit signs of being seriously ill but are not in immediate danger of life or limb will be triaged to "acute care" or "majors", where they will be seen by a physician and receive a more thorough assessment and treatment. Examples of "majors" include chest pain, difficulty breathing, abdominal pain and neurological complaints. Advanced diagnostic testing may be conducted at this stage, including laboratory testing of blood and/or urine, ultrasonography, CT or MRI scanning. Medications appropriate to manage the patient's condition will also be given. Patients may be discharged home from this area or admitted to the hospital for further treatment depending on underlying causes of the patient's chief complaint.

Patients whose condition is not immediately life-threatening will be sent to an area suitable to deal with them, and these areas might typically be termed a "prompt care" or "minors" area. Such patients may still have been found to have significant problems, including fractures, dislocations, and lacerations requiring suturing.

Children can present particular challenges in treatment. Some departments have dedicated pediatrics areas, and some departments employ a play therapist whose job is to put children at ease to reduce the anxiety caused by visiting the emergency department, as well as provide distraction therapy for simple procedures.

Many hospitals have a separate area for evaluation of psychiatric problems. These are often staffed by psychiatrists and mental health nurses and social workers. There is typically at least one room for people who are actively a risk to themselves or others (e.g. suicidal).

Fast decisions on life-and-death cases are critical in hospital emergency departments. As a result, doctors face great pressures to overtest and overtreat. The fear of missing something often leads to extra blood tests and imaging scans for what may be harmless chest pains, run-of-the-mill head bumps, and non-threatening stomach aches, with a high cost on the health care system.

== Nomenclature in English ==
Emergency department became commonly used when emergency medicine was recognized as a medical specialty, and hospitals and medical centres developed departments of emergency medicine to provide services. Other common variations include "emergency ward", "emergency unit", or "emergency center".

Accident and emergency (A&E) has been the term used in the United Kingdom since the 1980s when the term casualty was gradually replaced. In 2003, it was suggested by the UK Government that the word accident be removed from the name in a bid to deter non-emergency cases, though this was never taken up. It is also the term used in Hong Kong. Earlier terms such as "casualty ward", "casualty department", or "casualty" were previously used officially and continue to be used informally. The same applies to "emergency room", "emerg", or "ER" in North America, originating when emergency facilities were provided in a single room of the hospital by the department of surgery.

== Signage ==
Regardless of naming convention, there is a widespread usage of directional signage in white text on a red background across the world, which indicates the location of the emergency department, or a hospital with such facilities.

Signs on emergency departments may contain additional information. In some American states, there is close regulation of the design and content of such signs. For example, California requires wording such as "Comprehensive Emergency Medical Service" and "Physician On Duty", to prevent persons in need of critical care from presenting to facilities that are not fully equipped and staffed.

In some countries, including the United States and Canada, a smaller facility that may provide assistance in medical emergencies is known as a clinic. Larger communities often have walk-in clinics where people with medical problems that would not be considered serious enough to warrant an emergency department visit can be seen. These clinics often do not operate on a 24-hour basis. Very large clinics may operate as "free-standing emergency centres", which are open 24 hours and can manage a very large number of conditions. However, if a patient presents to a free-standing clinic with a condition requiring hospital admission, they must be transferred to an actual hospital, as these facilities do not have the capability to provide inpatient care.

Examples of emergency department signage

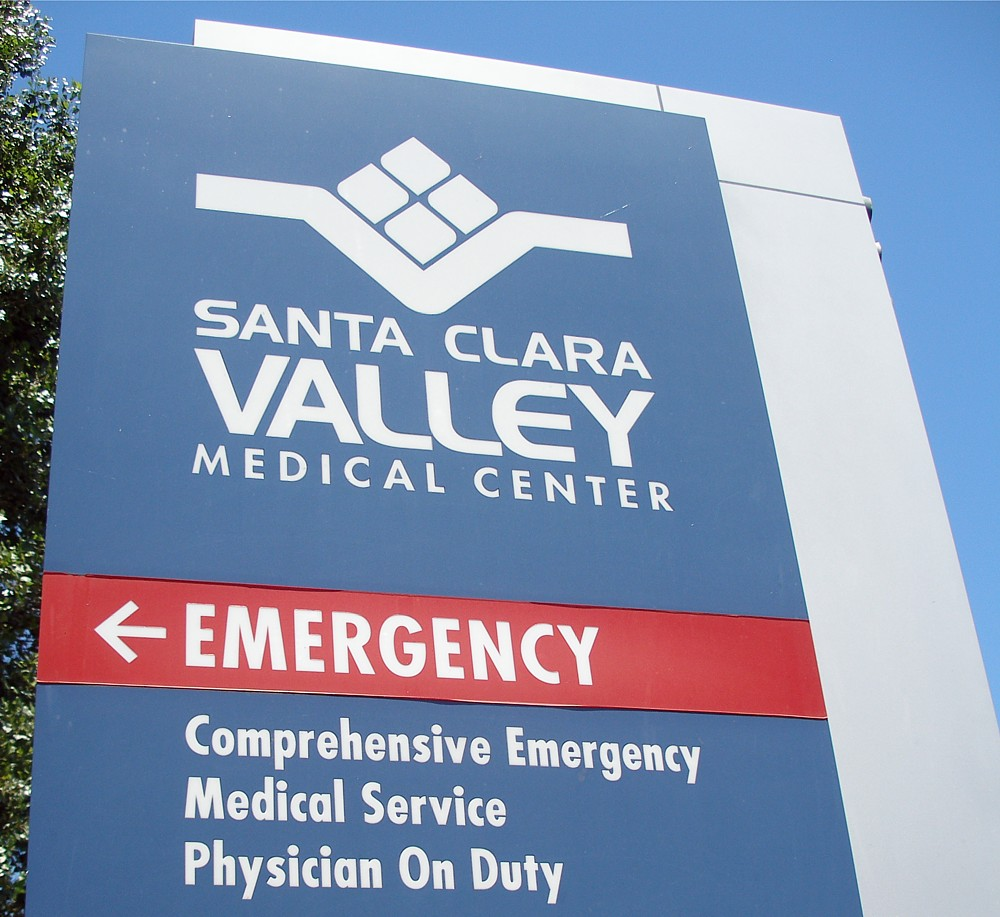
Santa Clara Valley Medical Center

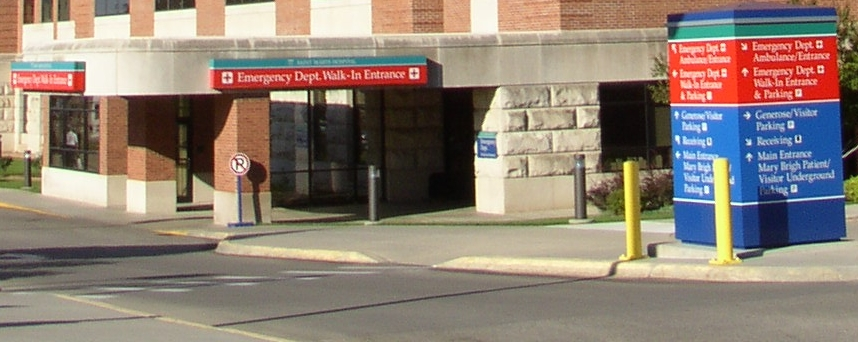
Mayo Clinic Hospital in Rochester, Minnesota

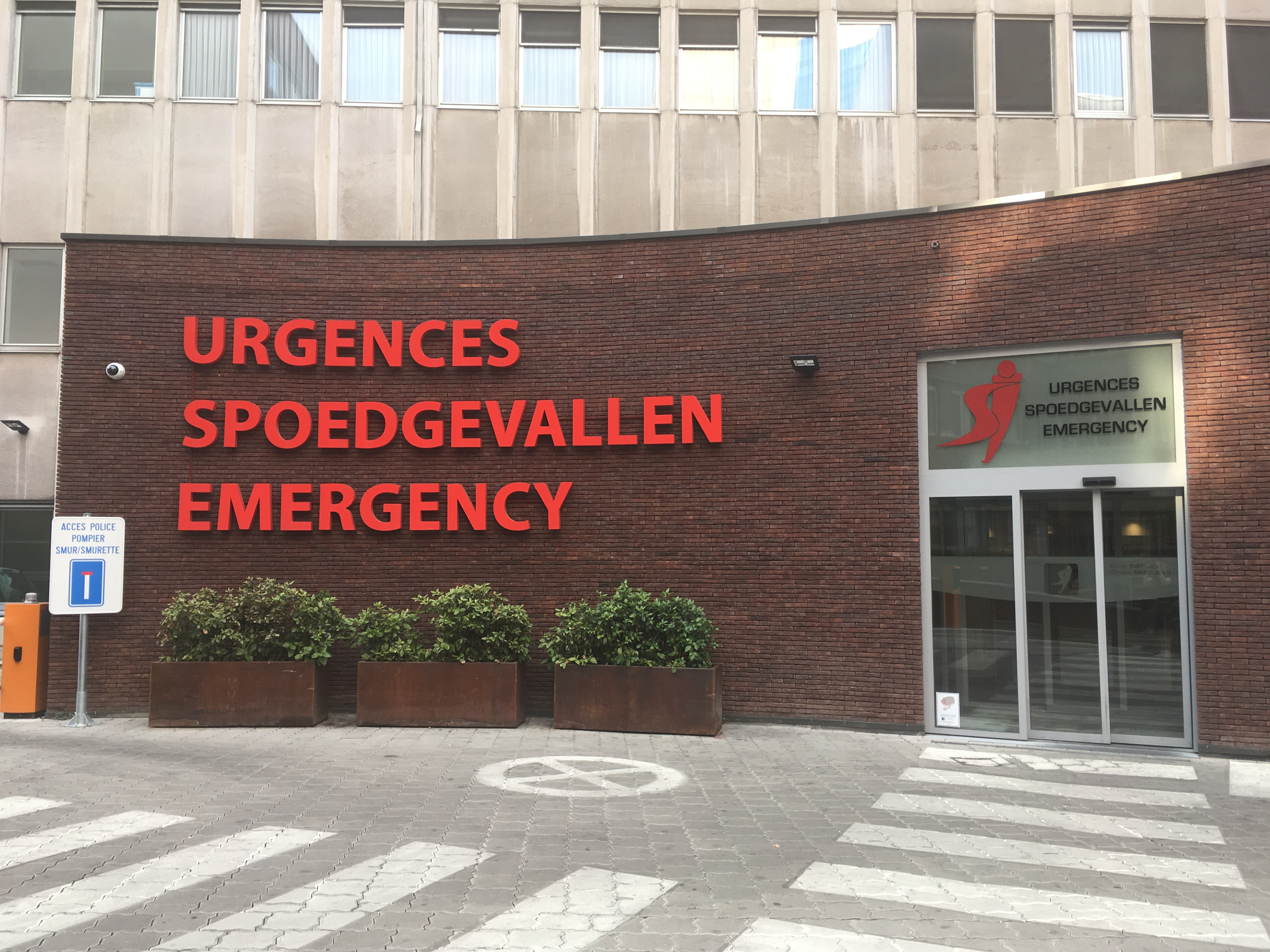
Trilingual signage in French, Dutch and English at an emergency department in Brussels, Belgium

== By country ==
=== United States ===
The Centers for Medicare and Medicaid Services (CMS) classified emergency departments into two types: Type A, the majority, which are open 24 hours a day, 7 days a week, 365 days a year; and Type B, the rest, which are not. Many US emergency departments are exceedingly busy. A study found that in 2009, there were an estimated 128,885,040 ED encounters in US hospitals. Approximately one-fifth of ED visits in 2010 were for patients under the age of 18 years. In 2009–2010, a total of 19.6 million emergency department visits in the United States were made by persons aged 65 and over. Most encounters (82.8 percent) resulted in treatment and release; 17.2 percent were admitted to inpatient care.

The 1986 Emergency Medical Treatment and Active Labor Act is an act of the United States Congress, that requires emergency departments, if the associated hospital receives payments from Medicare, to provide appropriate medical examination and emergency treatment to all individuals seeking treatment for a medical condition, regardless of citizenship, legal status, or ability to pay. Like an unfunded mandate, there are no reimbursement provisions.

Rates of ED visits rose between 2006 and 2011 for almost every patient characteristic and location. The total rate of ED visits increased 4.5% in that time. However, the rate of visits for patients under one year of age declined 8.3%.

A survey of New York area doctors in February 2007 found that injuries and even deaths have been caused by excessive waits for hospital beds by ED patients. A 2005 patient survey found an average ED wait time from 2.3 hours in Iowa to 5.0 hours in Arizona.

One inspection of Los Angeles area hospitals by Congressional staff found the EDs operating at an average of 116% of capacity (meaning there were more patients than available treatment spaces) with insufficient beds to accommodate victims of a terrorist attack the size of the 2004 Madrid train bombings. Three of the five Level I trauma centres were on "diversion", meaning ambulances with all but the most severely injured patients were being directed elsewhere because the ED could not safely accommodate any more patients. This controversial practice was banned in Massachusetts (except for major incidents, such as a fire in the ED), effective 1 January 2009; in response, hospitals have devoted more staff to the ED at peak times and moved some elective procedures to non-peak times.

In 2009, there were 1,800 EDs in the country. In 2011, about 421 out of every 1,000 people in the United States visited the emergency department; five times as many were discharged as were admitted. Rural areas are the highest rate of ED visits (502 per 1,000 population) and large metro counties had the lowest (319 visits per 1,000 population). By region, the Midwest had the highest rate of ED visits (460 per 1,000 population) and Western States had the lowest (321 visits per 1,000 population).

Most common reasons for discharged emergency department visits in the United States, 2011
Age (in years)	Reason for visit	Visits
<1	Fever of unknown origin	270,000
1–17	Superficial injury, contusion	1.6 million
18–44	Sprains and Strains	3.2 million
45–64	Nonspecific chest pain	1.5 million
65–84	Nonspecific chest pain	643,000
85+	Superficial injury, contusion	213,000

==== Freestanding ====
In addition to the normal hospital based emergency departments a trend has developed in some states of emergency departments not attached to hospitals. These new emergency departments are referred to as free standing emergency departments. In May 2023, Texas had 338 operating across the state, and Florida had 100 in August 2026. All total there are 800 to 900 across the United States. The rationale for these operations is the ability to operate outside of hospital policies that may lead to increased wait times and reduced patient satisfaction.

These departments have attracted controversy due to consumer confusion around their prices and insurance coverage. In 2017, the largest operator, Adeptus Health, declared bankruptcy.

==== Overuse and utilization management ====
Patients may visit the emergency room for non-emergencies, which typically costs the patient and the managed care insurance company more, and therefore the insurance company may apply utilization management to deny coverage. In 2004, a study found that emergency room visits were the most common reason for appealing disputes over coverage after receiving service. In 2017, Anthem expanded this denial coverage more broadly, provoking public policy reactions.

==== In the military ====
Emergency departments in the military benefit from the added support of enlisted personnel who are capable of performing a wide variety of tasks they have been trained for through specialized military schooling. For example, in United States military hospitals, Air Force Aerospace Medical Technicians and Navy Hospital Corpsmen perform tasks that fall under the scope of practice of both doctors (i.e. sutures, staples and incision and drainages) and nurses (i.e. medication administration, foley catheter insertion, and obtaining intravenous access) and also perform splinting of injured extremities, nasogastric tube insertion, intubation, wound cauterizing, eye irrigation, and much more. Often, some civilian education and/or certification will be required, such as an EMT certification, in case of the need to provide care outside the base where the member is stationed. The presence of highly trained enlisted personnel in an emergency department drastically reduces the workload on nurses and doctors.

=== United Kingdom ===
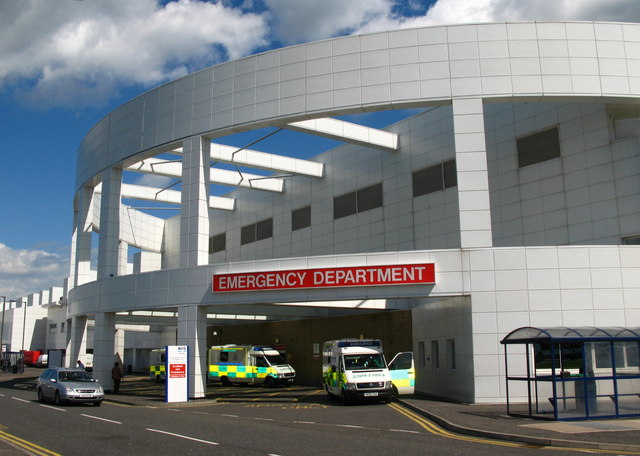
The emergency department at the Royal Infirmary of Edinburgh

A&E sign in the United Kingdom

UK road sign to a hospital with A&E

All accident and emergency (A&E) departments throughout the United Kingdom are financed and managed publicly by the National Health Service (NHS of each constituent country: England, Scotland, Wales and Northern Ireland). The term "A&E" is widely recognised and used rather than the full name; it is used on road signs, official documentation, etc. In Wales the Welsh name for A&E is Uned Achosion Brys ('Emergency Unit'), while the Scottish Gaelic term is aigreid agus èigean ('accident and emergency') but is not used on official signage.

A&E services are provided to all, without charge. Other NHS medical care, including hospital treatment following an emergency, is free of charge only to all who are "ordinarily resident" in Britain; residency rather than citizenship is the criterion (details on charges vary from country to country).

In England departments are divided into three categories:

- Type 1 department – major A&E, providing a consultant-led 24 hour service with full resuscitation facilities
- Type 2 department – single specialty A&E service (e.g. ophthalmology, dentistry)
- Type 3 department – other A&E/minor injury unit/walk-in centre, treating minor injuries and illnesses

Historically, waits for assessment in A&E were very long in some areas of the UK. In October 2002, the Department of Health introduced a four-hour target in emergency departments that required departments in England to assess and treat patients within four hours of arrival, with referral and assessment by other departments if deemed necessary. It was expected that the patients would have physically left the department within the four hours. Present policy is that 95% of all patient cases do not "breach" this four-hour wait. The busiest departments in the UK outside London include University Hospital of Wales in Cardiff, The North Wales Regional Hospital in Wrexham, the Royal Infirmary of Edinburgh and Queen Alexandra Hospital in Portsmouth.

In July 2014, the QualityWatch research programme published in-depth analysis which tracked 41 million A&E attendances from 2010 to 2013. This showed that the number of patients in a department at any one time was closely linked to waiting times, and that crowding in A&E had increased as a result of a growing and ageing population, compounded by the freezing or reduction of A&E capacity. Between 2010/11 and 2012/13 crowding increased by 8%, despite a rise of just 3% in A&E visits, and this trend looks set to continue. Other influential factors identified by the report included temperature (with both hotter and colder weather pushing up A&E visits), staffing and inpatient bed numbers.

A&E services in the UK are often the focus of a great deal of media and political interest, and data on A&E performance is published weekly. However, this is only one part of a complex urgent and emergency care system. Reducing A&E waiting times therefore requires a comprehensive, coordinated strategy across a range of related services.

Many A&E departments are crowded and confusing. Many of those attending are understandably anxious, and some are mentally ill, and especially at night are under the influence of alcohol or other substances. Pearson Lloyd's redesign – 'A Better A&E' – is claimed to have reduced aggression against hospital staff in the departments by 50 per cent. A system of environmental signage provides location-specific information for patients. Screens provide live information about how many cases are being handled and the current status of the A&E department. Waiting times for patients to be seen at A&E were rising in the years leading up to 2020, and were hugely worsened during the COVID-19 pandemic that started in 2020.

In response to the year-on-year increasing pressure on A&E units, followed by the unprecedented effects of the COVID-19 pandemic, the NHS in late 2020 proposed a radical change to handling of urgent and emergency care, separating "emergency" and "urgent". Emergencies are life-threatening illnesses or accidents which require immediate, intensive treatment. Services that should be accessed in an emergency include ambulance (via 999) and emergency departments. Urgent requirements are for an illness or injury that requires urgent attention but is not a life-threatening situation. Urgent care services include a phone consultation through the NHS111 Clinical Assessment Service, pharmacy advice, out-of-hours GP appointments, and/or referral to an urgent treatment centre (UTC). As part of the response, walk-in Urgent Treatment Centres (UTC) were created. People potentially needing A&E treatment are recommended to phone the NHS111 line, which will either book an arrival time for A&E, or recommend a more appropriate procedure. (Information is for England; details may vary in different countries.)

== Critical conditions handled ==
=== Cardiac arrest ===
Cardiac arrest is a sudden (in most cases, unexpected) loss of heart function, breathing, and consciousness. This emergency usually results from an electrical disturbance in the heart that disrupts its pumping action, stopping blood flow to the rest of the body. It is different from a heart attack, where blood flow to a part of the heart is blocked. Cardiac arrest may occur in the ED/A&E or a patient may be transported by ambulance to the emergency department already in this state. Treatment is basic life support, Automated External Defibrillator (AED), and advanced life support as taught in advanced life support and advanced cardiac life support courses. Cardiac arrest is not a condition that can be self-diagnosed. It requires immediate medical attention and diagnosis by a healthcare professional.

=== Heart attack ===
Patients arriving at the emergency department with a myocardial infarction (heart attack) are likely to be triaged to the resuscitation area. They will receive oxygen and monitoring and have an early ECG; aspirin will be given if not contraindicated or not already administered by the ambulance team; morphine or diamorphine will be given for pain; sub lingual (under the tongue) or buccal (between cheek and upper gum) glyceryl trinitrate (nitroglycerin) (GTN or NTG) will be given, unless contraindicated by the presence of other drugs.

An ECG that reveals ST segment elevation suggests complete blockage of one of the main coronary arteries. These patients require immediate reperfusion (re-opening) of the occluded vessel. This can be achieved in two ways: thrombolysis (clot-busting medication) or percutaneous transluminal coronary angioplasty (PTCA). Both of these are effective in reducing significantly the mortality of myocardial infarction. Many centers are now moving to the use of PTCA as it is somewhat more effective than thrombolysis if it can be administered early. This may involve transfer to a nearby facility with facilities for angioplasty.

=== Physical trauma ===
Major trauma, the term for patients with multiple injuries, often from a motor vehicle crash or a major fall, is initially handled in the Emergency Department. However, trauma is a separate (surgical) specialty from emergency medicine (which is itself a medical specialty, and has certifications in the United States from the American Board of Emergency Medicine).

Trauma is treated by a trauma team who have been trained using the principles taught in the internationally recognized Advanced Trauma Life Support (ATLS) course of the American College of Surgeons. Some other international training bodies have started to run similar courses based on the same principles.

The services that are provided in an emergency department can range from x-rays and the setting of broken bones to those of a full-scale trauma centre. A patient's chance of survival is greatly improved if the patient receives definitive treatment (i.e. surgery or reperfusion) within one hour of an accident (such as a car accident) or onset of acute illness (such as a heart attack). This critical time frame is commonly known as the "golden hour".

Some emergency departments in smaller hospitals are located near a helipad which is used by helicopters to transport a patient to a trauma centre. This inter-hospital transfer is often done when a patient requires advanced medical care unavailable at the local facility. In such cases the emergency department can only stabilize the patient for transport.

=== Mental illness(es) ===
Some patients arrive at an emergency department for a complaint of mental illness. In many jurisdictions (including many U.S. states), patients who appear to be mentally ill and to present a danger to themselves or others may be brought against their will to an emergency department by law enforcement officers for psychiatric examination. The emergency department conducts medical clearance rather than treats acute behavioral disorders. From the emergency department, patients with significant mental illness will be transferred to a psychiatric unit (in many cases involuntarily). In recent years, EmPATH units have been developed in the United States to relieve pressure on hospital emergency departments and improve the treatment of psychiatric emergencies.

Emergency departments are often the first point of contact with healthcare for people who self-harm. As such they are crucial in supporting them and can play a role in preventing suicide. At the same time, according to a study conducted in England, people who self-harm often experience that they do not receive meaningful care at the emergency department. Higher ambient temperature may also increase mental illness related emergency department presentations, particularly in females.

=== Asthma and COPD ===
Acute exacerbations of chronic respiratory diseases, mainly asthma and chronic obstructive pulmonary disease (COPD), are assessed as emergencies and treated with oxygen therapy, bronchodilators, steroids or theophylline, have an urgent chest X-ray and arterial blood gases and are referred for intensive care if necessary. Noninvasive ventilation in the ED has reduced the requirement for tracheal intubation in many cases of severe exacerbations of COPD.

== Special facilities, training, and equipment ==
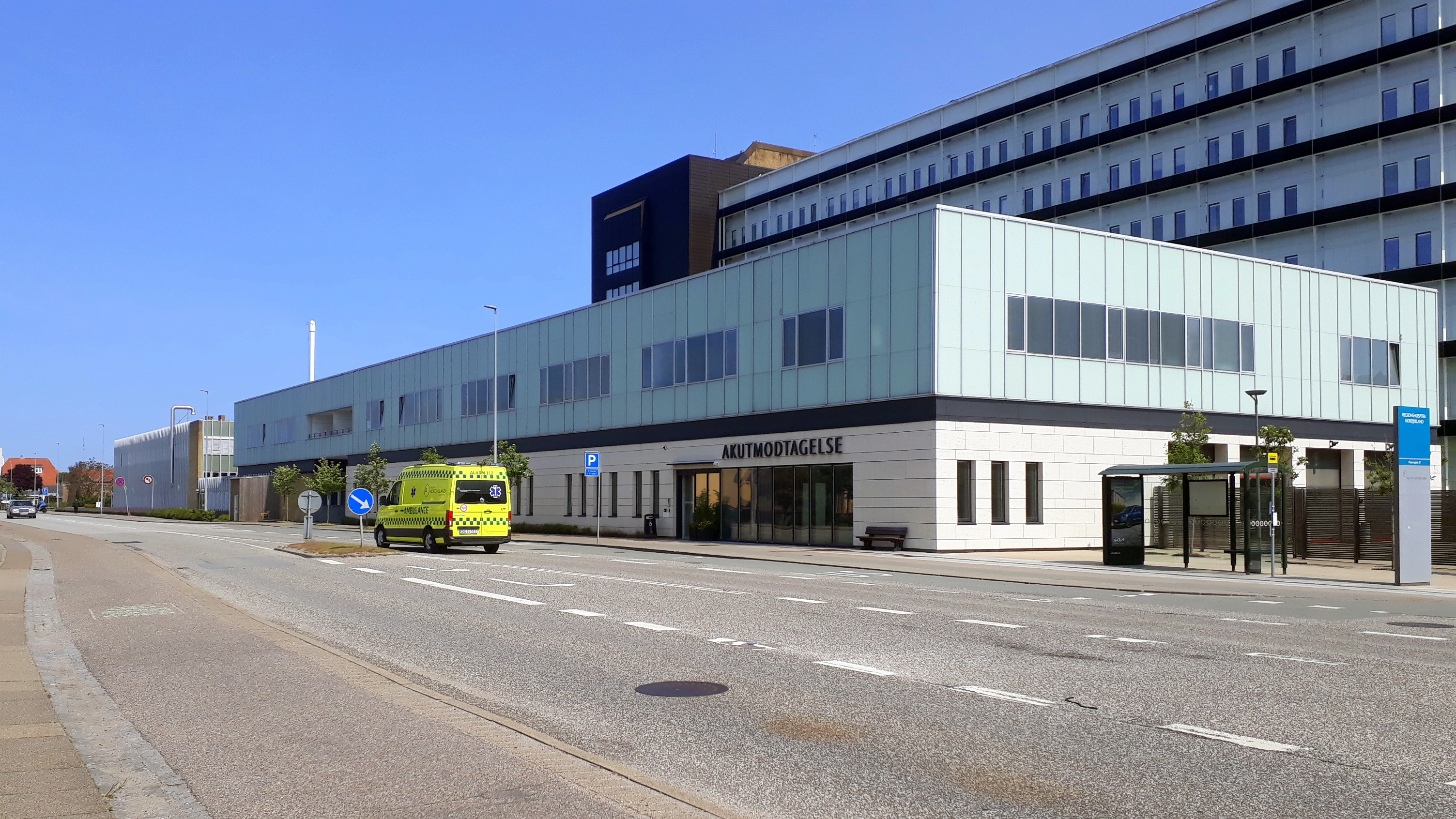
An emergency department in the Danish town of Hjørring, note the ambulance

An ED requires different equipment and different approaches than most other hospital divisions. Patients frequently arrive with unstable conditions, and so must be treated quickly. They may be unconscious, and information such as their medical history, allergies, and blood type may be unavailable. ED staff are trained to work quickly and effectively even with minimal information.

ED staff must also interact efficiently with pre-hospital care providers such as EMTs, paramedics, and others who are occasionally based in an ED. The pre-hospital providers may use equipment unfamiliar to the average physician, but ED physicians must be expert in using (and safely removing) specialized equipment, since devices such as military anti-shock trousers ("MAST") and traction splints require special procedures. Among other reasons, given that they must be able to handle specialized equipment, physicians can now specialize in emergency medicine, and EDs employ many such specialists.

ED staff have much in common with ambulance and fire crews, combat medics, search and rescue teams, and disaster response teams. Often, joint training and practice drills are organized to improve the coordination of this complex response system. Busy EDs exchange a great deal of equipment with ambulance crews, and both must provide for replacing, returning, or reimbursing for costly items.

Cardiac arrest and major trauma are relatively common in EDs, so defibrillators, automatic ventilation and CPR machines, and bleeding control dressings are used heavily. Survival in such cases is greatly enhanced by shortening the wait for key interventions, and in recent years some of this specialized equipment has spread to pre-hospital settings. The best-known example is defibrillators, which spread first to ambulances, then in an automatic version to police cars and fire apparatus, and most recently to public spaces such as airports, office buildings, hotels, and even shopping malls.

Because time is such an essential factor in emergency treatment, EDs typically have their own diagnostic equipment to avoid waiting for equipment installed elsewhere in the hospital. Nearly all have radiographic examination rooms staffed by dedicated radiographers, and many now have full radiology facilities including CT scanners and ultrasonography equipment. Laboratory services may be handled on a priority basis by the hospital lab, or the ED may have its own "STAT Lab" for basic labs (blood counts, blood typing, toxicology screens, etc.) that must be returned very rapidly.

== Non-emergency use ==
Metrics applicable to the ED can be grouped into three main categories, volume, cycle time, and patient satisfaction. Volume metrics including arrivals per hour, percentage of ED beds occupied, and age of patients are understood at a basic level at all hospitals as an indication for staffing requirements. Cycle time metrics are the mainstays of the evaluation and tracking of process efficiency and are less widespread since an active effort is needed to collect and analyze this data. Patient satisfaction metrics, already commonly collected by nursing groups, physician groups, and hospitals, are useful in demonstrating the impact of changes in patient perception of care over time. Since patient satisfaction metrics are derivative and subjective, they are less useful in primary process improvement. Health information exchanges can reduce nonurgent ED visits by supplying current data about admissions, discharges, and transfers to health plans and accountable care organizations, allowing them to shift ED use to primary care settings.

In all primary care trusts there are out of hours medical consultations provided by general practitioners or nurse practitioners.

In the United States, barriers to accessing care contribute to frequent emergency room use. The National Hospital Ambulatory Medical Care Survey looked at the ten most common symptoms for which giving rise to emergency room visits (cough, sore throat, back pain, fever, headache, abdominal pain, chest pain, other pain, shortness of breath, vomiting) and made suggestions as to which would be the most cost-effective choice among virtual care, retail clinic, urgent care, or emergency room. Notably, certain complaints may also be addressed by a telephone call to a person's primary care provider. However, subsequent studies have shown that identifying non-emergency visits based on discharge diagnoses is inaccurate because people commonly present for emergency care for other reasons and are assigned a diagnosis after testing and evaluation.

In the United States, and many other countries, hospitals are beginning to create areas in their emergency rooms for people with minor injuries. These are commonly referred as Fast Track or Minor Care units. These units are for people with non-life-threatening injuries. The use of these units within a department have been shown to significantly improve the flow of patients through a department and to reduce waiting times. Urgent care clinics are another alternative, where patients can go to receive immediate care for non-life-threatening conditions. To reduce the strain on limited ED resources, American Medical Response created a checklist that allows EMTs to identify intoxicated individuals who can be safely sent to detoxification facilities instead.

== Issues ==
=== Overcrowding ===
Emergency department overcrowding is when function of a department is hindered by an inability to treat all patients in an adequate manner. This is a common occurrence in emergency departments worldwide. Overcrowding causes inadequate patient care which leads to poorer patient outcomes. To address this problem, escalation policies are used by emergency departments when responding to an increase in demand (e.g., a sudden inflow of patients) or a reduction in capacity (e.g., a lack of beds to admit patients). The policies aim to maintain the ability to deliver patient care, without compromising safety, by modifying "normal" processes.

==== Emergency department waiting times ====
Emergency department (ED) waiting times have a serious impact on patient mortality, morbidity with readmission in less than 30 days, length of stay, and patient satisfaction. The probability of death increases each 3 minutes for 1% in case of major injuries in the abdomen part. (Journal of Trauma and Acute Care Surgery) Equipment in emergency departments follows the prompt treatment principle with the least possible patient transfers from admittance to X-ray diagnostics. A review of the literature bears out the logical premise that since the outcome of treatment for all diseases and injuries is time-sensitive, the sooner treatment is rendered, the better the outcome. Various studies reported significant associations between waiting times and higher mortality and morbidity among those who survived. It is clear from the literature that untimely hospital deaths and morbidity can be reduced by reductions in ED waiting times.

==== Exit block ====
A significant proportion of emergency patients are discharged after treatment, but many require admission for ongoing observation, treatment, or to ensure adequate social care before discharge. If patients requiring admission cannot be placed in inpatient beds swiftly, "exit block" or "access block" occurs. This often leads to crowding and can lead to delays in treatment for newly presenting cases ("arrival access block"). This is more common in densely populated areas and affects adult departments more than pediatric ones. Exit block can lead to delays for the patients awaiting inpatient beds ("boarding") and also for new patients arriving at an exit-blocked department. Proposed solutions include changes in staffing or increasing inpatient capacity.

==== Frequent users ====
Frequent emergency service users are individuals who present themselves at a hospital much more often than non-frequent presenters. Many frequent users are homeless individuals seeking shelter and food at the hospital. Federal laws and regulations in the United States, like EMTALA and HIPAA, limit the options of hospital personnel when an individual presents to the ED with a fabricated problem. These individuals do not account for a significant number of visits but typically require a disproportionate amount of hospital resources. To help prevent inappropriate emergency department use and return visits some hospitals offer care coordination and support services such as at-home and in-shelter transitional primary care for frequent users and short-term housing for homeless patients recovering after discharge.

==== Telemedicine ====
A study found that telemedicine services in Saudi Arabia were effective in reducing emergency department overload by providing medical advice to patients with less urgent medical issues.

=== Violence against healthcare workers ===
According to a survey at an urban inner-city tertiary care center in Vancouver, 57% of health care workers were physically assaulted in 1996. 73% were afraid of patients as a result of violence, 49% hid their identities from patients, and 74% had reduced job satisfaction. Over one-quarter of the respondents took days off because of violence. Of respondents no longer working in the emergency department, 67% reported that they had left the job at least partly owing to violence. Twenty-four-hour security and a workshop on violence prevention strategies were felt to be the most useful potential interventions. Physical exercise, sleep and the company of family and friends were the most frequent coping strategies cited by those surveyed.

=== Medication errors ===
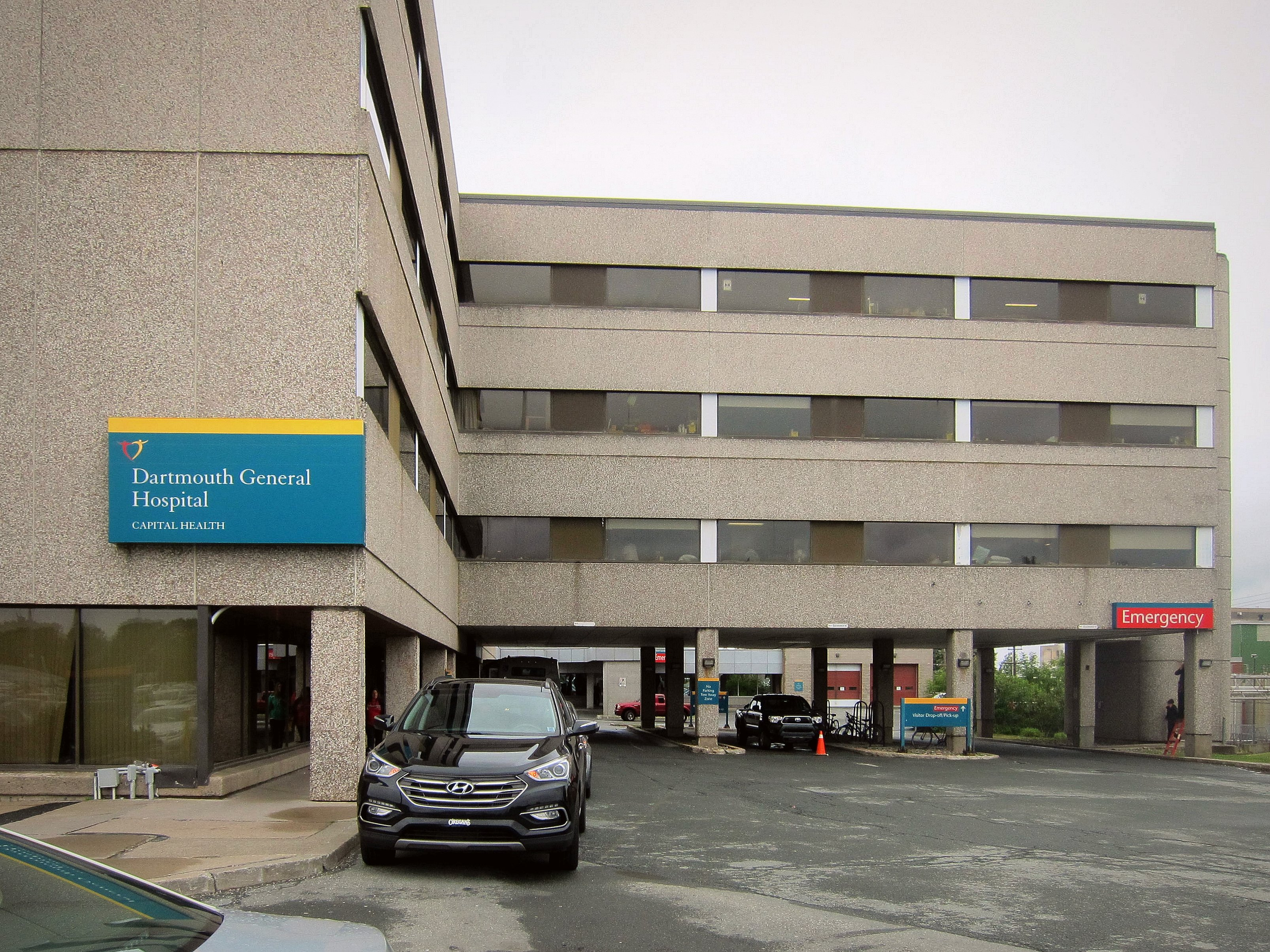
Emergency Department of Dartmouth General Hospital

Medication errors are issues that lead to incorrect medication distribution or potential for patient harm. As of 2014, around 3% of all hospital-related adverse effects were due to medication errors in the emergency department (ED); between 4% and 14% of medications given to patients in the ED were incorrect and children were particularly at risk.

Errors can arise if the doctor prescribes the wrong medication, if the prescription intended by the doctor is not the one actually communicated to the pharmacy due to an illegibly written prescription or misheard verbal order, if the pharmacy dispenses the wrong medication, or if the medication is then given to the wrong person.

The ED is a riskier environment than other areas of the hospital due to medical practitioners not knowing the patient as well as they know longer term hospital patients, due to time pressure caused by overcrowding, and due to the emergency-driven nature of the medicine that is practiced there.

== See also ==
- Acute medical unit
- Emergency department in France
- Emergency medical services
- Morgue
- Walk-in clinic
