= James J. Smith =

James J. Smith may refer to

- James J. Smith, an American FBI agent involved in the Katrina Leung scandal
- Murder of James J. Smith, a murder of an American man on November 20, 1932
