= History of the Nation of Islam =

The Nation of Islam (NOI) is an American religious organization founded in the 1930s. It was established in Detroit by Wallace Fard Muhammad, whom followers identified as a prophet born in Mecca.

== Background ==
Islam existed in North America prior to the formation of the United States. African Muslims were among the Spanish expeditions that explored the continent during the early modern period, and were also among the enslaved people transported there via the Atlantic slave trade of the 16th to 19th centuries. It is estimated that, at the time of the American Revolution in the 1760s–80s, approximately 15 percent of enslaved Africans and African Americans in the new United States were Muslim. Although Islam probably died out among the African American community over subsequent generations, the notion that Islam was historically associated with African Americans influenced the emergence of groups like the NOI in the early 20th century.

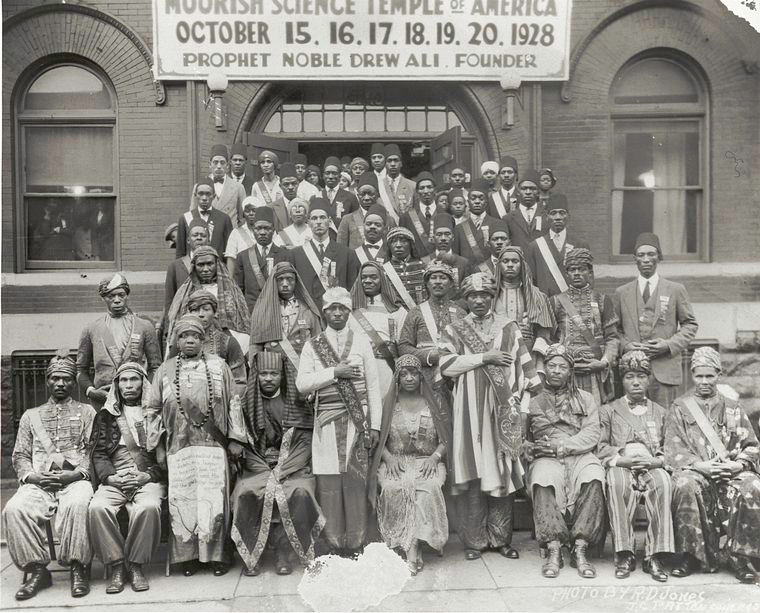
The Moorish Science Temple of America, whose members are pictured here in 1928, was a key influence on the Nation of Islam

The Nation formed in the 1930s, when large numbers of African Americans were migrating from southern states to northern cities. Within that context, various groups emerged that would influence the NOI. In particular, the scholar of religion Dawn Gibson characterised the Nation as having been "born out of a fusion" between the ideas of Garveyism and the Moorish Science Temple of America. Central to Garveyism, and thus a major influence on the NOI's ideas, was the Jamaican black nationalist Marcus Garvey, who lived in the US from 1916 to 1927 and who formed the Universal Negro Improvement Association and African Communities League (UNIA). According to the scholar Zoe Colley, Garvey's "UNIA provided the cultural bedrock for the NOI". It was from Garveyism that the Nation took its black nationalism, including its emphasis on economic nationalism and its calls for black self-sufficiency and enterprise.

The second key influence on the Nation was the Moorish Science Temple, an organization also promoting an idiosyncratic religion that that its followers claimed was Islamic. This had been established by the North Carolina-born African American Noble Drew Ali in Newark, New Jersey, in 1913. Drew Ali claimed that he was the reincarnation of both Jesus and Muhammad, and maintained that African Americans should refer to themselves as "Moorish Americans", reflecting what he believed were their connections to the Islamic Moors of North Africa. In addition to Garveyism and the Moorish Science Temple, further influences on the development of the Nation included African American Christianity, Freemasonry, and the Jehovah's Witnesses.

== Wallace Fard Muhammad ==
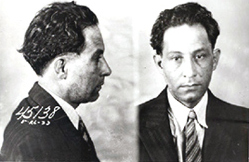
Wallace Fard Muhammad in a 1933 police mug shot

The Nation of Islam was founded by Wallace Fard Muhammad, who began preaching his ideas among Detroit's African Americans in July 1930. Fard Muhammad claimed that he was an Arab from Mecca who had come to the United States on a mission to the African American people, whom he called the "Nation of Islam", to restore them to their original faith. The Nation has since taught that Fard Muhammad was the latest Allah (God) himself. They have claimed that he was born in Mecca on February 26, 1877, the son of a black Meccan named Alphonso and a white woman from the Caucasus Mountains named Baby Gee. Being half-white, the NOI maintain, was necessary to allow Fard Muhammad to move freely in white society.

Outside of the Nation, various theories have been proposed as to Fard Muhammad's true identity. The Federal Bureau of Investigation (FBI) later noted that Fard Muhammad's fingerprints matched those of Wallie D. Ford, a white man who had a record of arrests and had served a three-year sentence in San Quentin Prison for drug charges. Ford had been released in May 1929, a year before the appearance of Fard Muhammad. The NOI reject the identification of Fard Muhammad as Ford, claiming that the FBI forged the fingerprint evidence. There have also been suggestions made that, on his release from prison, Fard had joined the Moorish Science Temple of America and subsequently established his Nation as a breakaway faction.

My name is W. D. Fard, and I come from the Holy City of Mecca. More about myself I will not tell you yet, for the time has not yet come. I am your brother. You have not yet seen me in my royal robes.

— A message from Fard Muhammad, as reported by an early follower

Fard Muhammad's following grew rapidly. He held meetings three days a week which attracted 7,000 to 8,000 people; most of his early followers were southern migrants who had headed north, and some were former members of the Moorish Science Temple. Fard Muhammad wrote two manuals, the Secret Ritual of the Nation of Islam and the Teaching for the Lost Found Nation of Islam in a Mathematical Way. He also urged his followers to listen to the radio sermons of the Jehovah's Witnesses and Baptist fundamentalists. He established a bureaucratic administration within the Nation, its own system of schools, and both the Fruit of Islam (FOI) paramilitary wing for men and the Muslim Girls Training School for women.

In 1931, an African American named Elijah Poole became a disciple of Fard Muhammad. Poole had been born in Bold Springs, Georgia in 1897; his father was a sharecropper and Baptist preacher. In 1923, Poole and his wife Clara relocated to Detroit, where he joined Garvey's UNIA, and worked in industrial plants before becoming unemployed amid the Great Depression. After Poole joined the NOI, Fard Muhammad gave him the new name of Elijah Karriem, later appointing him supreme minister of the Nation and renaming him Elijah Muhammad. In 1933, Elijah Muhammad set up a new temple on Chicago's South Side.

The early NOI faced problems from law enforcement. In 1932 the Detroit Police Department arrested an NOI member for a murder which they claimed was a human sacrifice, generating growing press coverage. The police then raided the Nation's headquarters and arrested Fard Muhammad, but he was soon released. Subsequently, he would be arrested several further times; his September 1933 arrest for disorderly conduct in Chicago would be his last known verified whereabouts. In 1934, Fard Muhammad disappeared without notifying his followers or designating a successor. Rumors spread that he had moved to Europe or that he had been killed, either by the police or by former followers.

== Elijah Muhammad's leadership ==
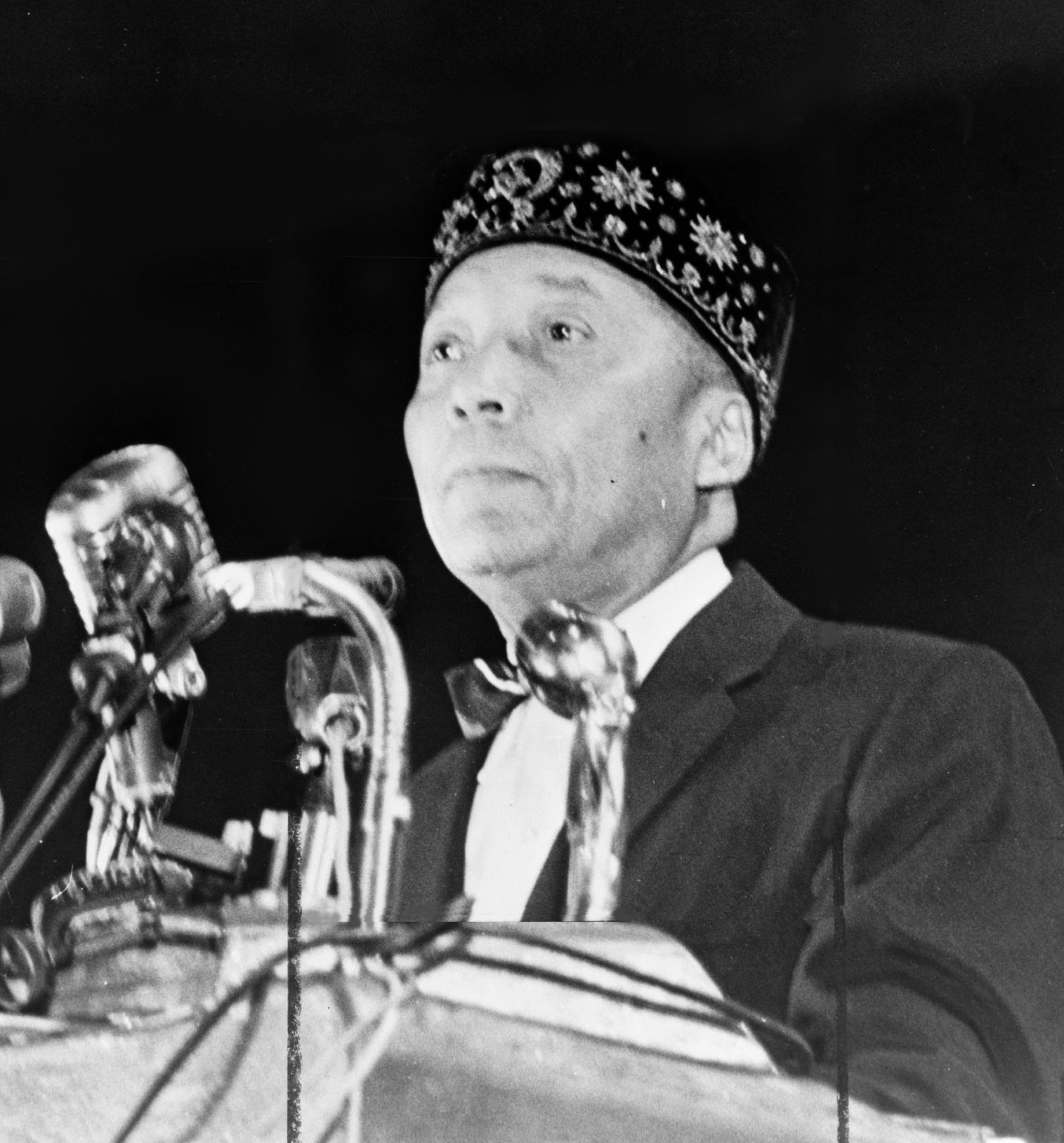
Elijah Muhammad, who took over the Nation after its founder's disappearance

With Fard Muhammad gone, Elijah Muhammad became head of the Nation. It was under his leadership "that the NOI's theology crystallized", his ideas being transmitted through various publications and hundreds of speeches. Elijah Muhammad claimed that Fard Muhammad had been the latest Allah and that he had now returned to his own realm, with Elijah Muhammad remaining on Earth as his messenger. Elijah Muhammad relocated the NOI's headquarters to Chicago, and embarked on seven years traveling the US to promote his religion, especially along the East Coast.

During the Second World War, in which the US fought Japan, the FBI began monitoring the Nation; FBI informants reported pro-Japanese sentiment being expressed at its meetings. Many Nation members refused the military draft and in September 1942 the FBI arrested 65 NOI members, including Elijah Muhammad, for doing so; he was imprisoned until August 1946. Despite these set-backs, Elijah Muhammad oversaw the Nation's development into a multi-million dollar business empire incorporating apartments, factories, farms and a small bank. He himself lived at a villa named The Palace in Chicago's Hyde Park area, and in winter moved to a large ranch outside Phoenix, Arizona.

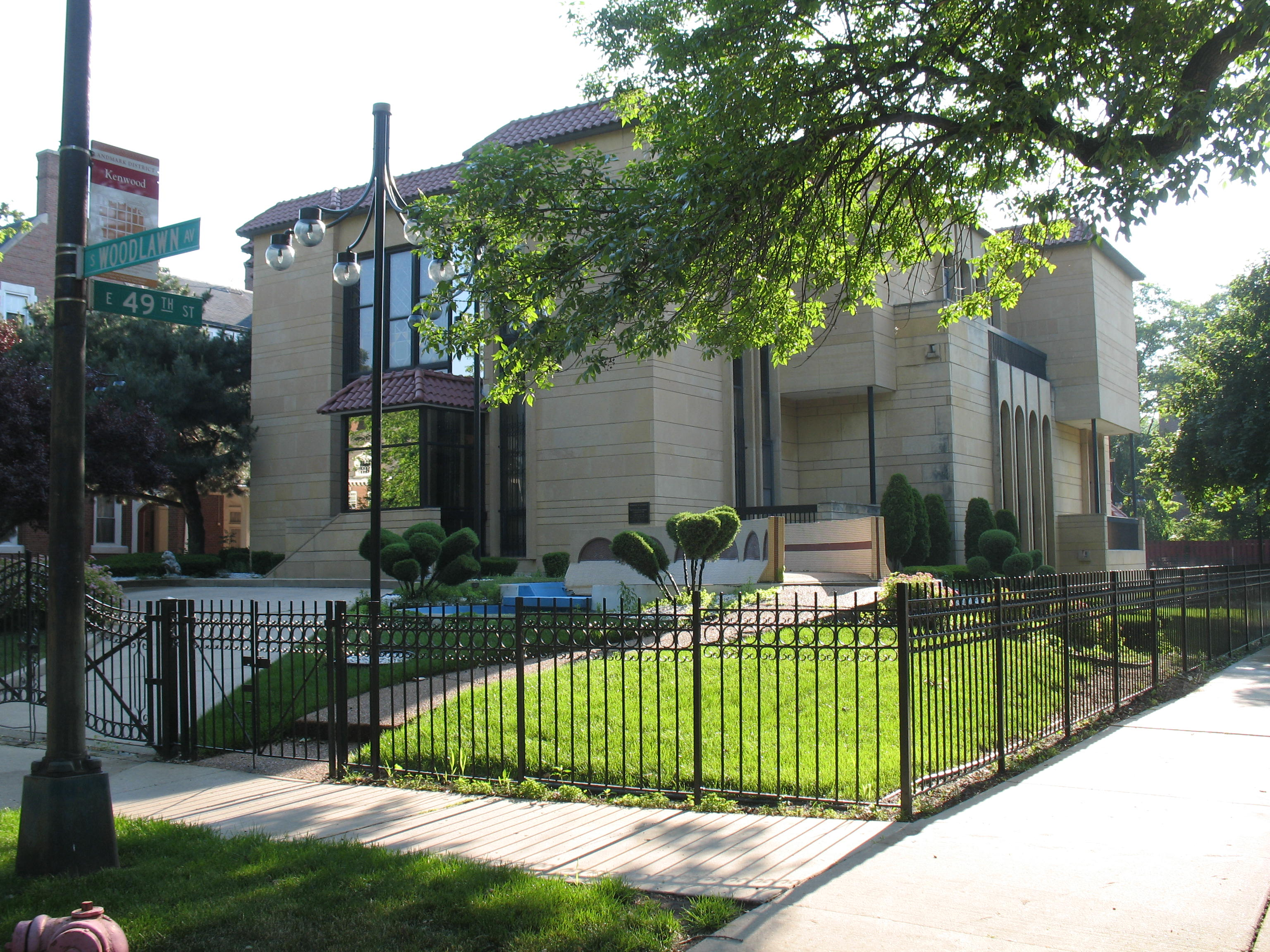
Elijah Muhammad's residence in Chicago, termed The Palace

The NOI's membership grew during the latter part of the 1950s. In 1959, the FBI encouraged the media to attack the group, hoping to discredit it; that year, a documentary about the Nation, The Hate that Hate Produced, was screened, bringing growing awareness of the group to the American public. The US press increasingly framed the NOI as anti-American and black supremacist, with the civil rights movement largely presenting it as evidence for the harmful effect that poor race relations were having in the US. This negative criticism nonetheless gave the group significant attention and assisted its recruitment. Further press attention came in 1962, when Los Angeles police raided one of the Nation's temples, during which one member was killed and seven injured. Additional issues for the group arose in 1963, when a schism in the Nation's Temple Number 7 in Harlem, New York City led to the creation of a new group, the Five Percent Nation of Islam.

One of the NOI's most significant members in this period was Malcolm X. Born Malcolm Little, he discovered the Nation while in prison; following his release in 1952 he rose swiftly through its hierarchy. In 1960, he launched the newspaper Muhammad Speaks, which reached a circulation of over 600,000, and in 1963 he became the Nation's first national representative. He also travelled internationally; in Britain, he met with Michael de Freitas, who converted to the Nation and created a British branch. Another prominent NOI member was the boxer Muhammad Ali. Born Cassius Clay, he encountered the Nation in 1961 and received significant media criticism after announcing his membership of the group in 1964.

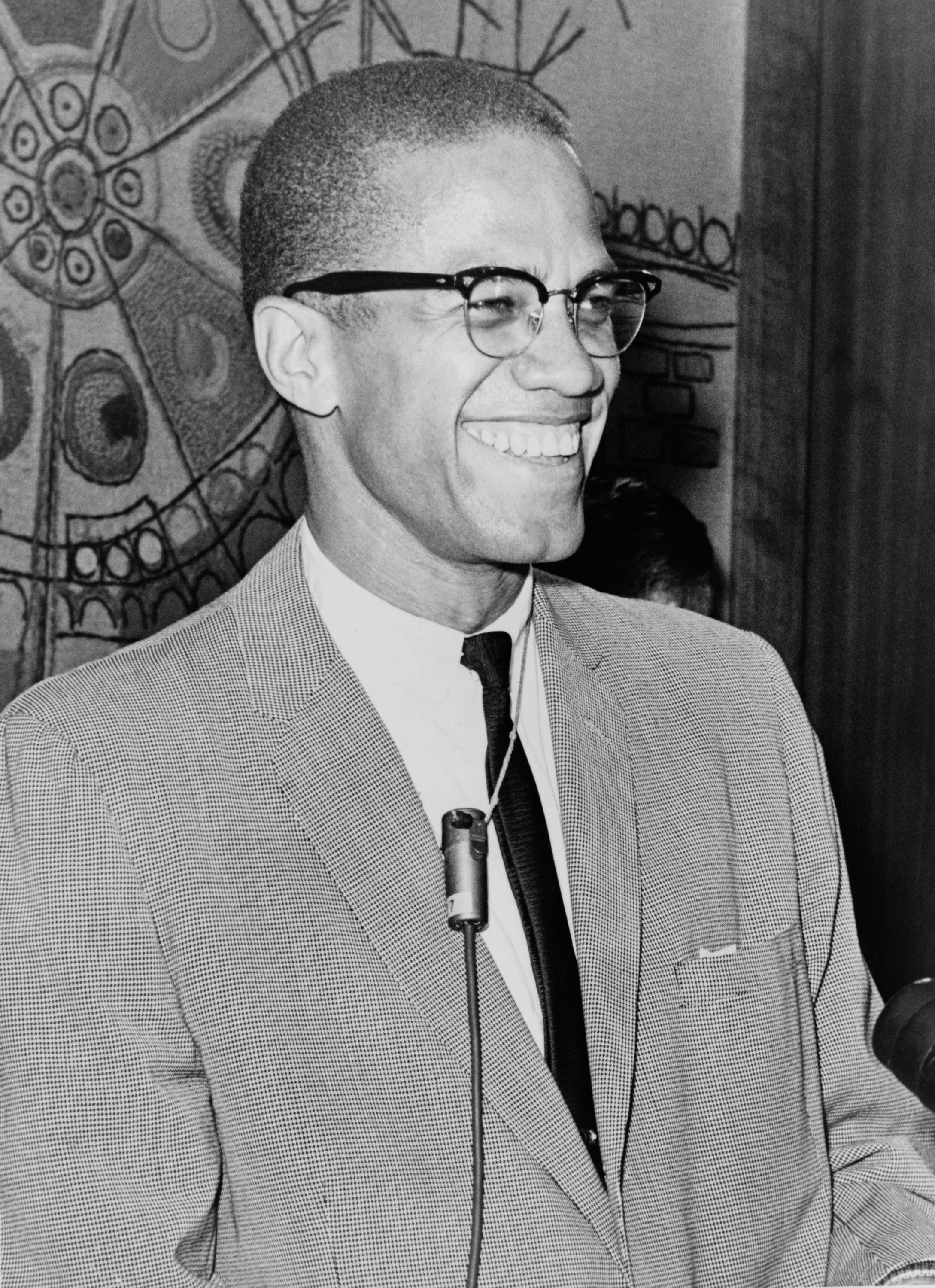
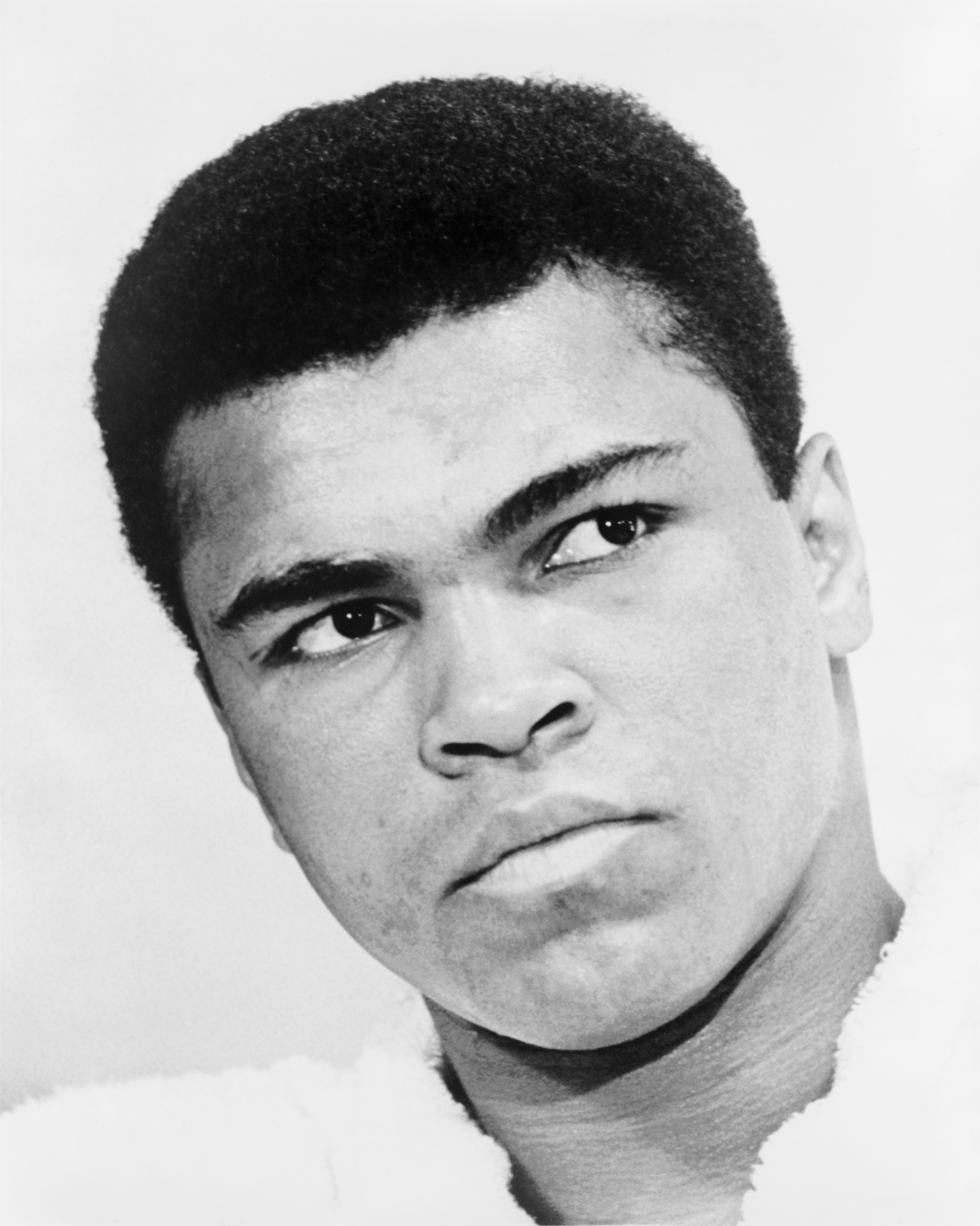
During the early 1960s, Malcolm X (left) and Muhammad Ali (right) helped raise the profile of the Nation.

Malcolm X's subsequent pilgrimage to Mecca resulted in encounters with white Muslims which helped shift his views of white people. In light of these experiences, in March 1964 he left the Nation and became a Sunni Muslim. He began denouncing Elijah Muhammad's extramarital affairs and accused the Nation of holding back the revolutionary potential of African Americans. In February 1965, Malcolm X was assassinated. The following year, three NOI members were convicted of the killing. There was press speculation that the Nation's leaders were complicit, something which damaged the group's reputation; recruitment declined in the latter half of the 1960s.

In 1972, the NOI bought the St. Constantine Greek Orthodox Church in Chicago and transformed it into their headquarters temple, Mosque Maryam. By 1974 it had either a temple/mosque or study group in every US state and in the District of Columbia. Relations with law enforcement remained strained; in 1972, a New York City policeman was shot and killed during a search of a NOI mosque in Harlem. The group continued to face opposition from the FBI, which engaged in a renewed counterintelligence project to destabilise it from the late 1960s. This included sowing discord between the Nation and the Black Panther Party, encouraging several incidents in which Black Panthers attacked NOI newspaper sellers.

A difficult relationship also persisted with the larger American Muslim community. Although Elijah Muhammad drew greater elements from Sunni Islam into the Nation—and undertook the hajj pilgrimage to Mecca in 1959, 1967, and 1971—other American Muslim groups increasingly condemned the Nation as un-Islamic. Conflict developed between the NOI and other Muslim groups with largely African American followings. In 1973, NOI members killed seven members of Hamaas Abdul Khaalis' Hanafi Muslim group, five of them children; the Nation's leadership denied sanctioning the attack.

== Wallace Muhammad and the NOI's transition to Sunni Islam ==
In 1975, Elijah Muhammad died and was succeeded by his son, Wallace D. Muhammad. Wallace Muhammad had had a strained relationship with his father and his father's teachings; while imprisoned in the early 1960s he had moved closer to Sunni Islam and had left the Nation on several occasions during the 1960s and 1970s, only re-joining in 1974. As leader, Wallace Muhammad launched what he called a "Second Resurrection" in the movement.

Wallace Muhammad increasingly aligned the group with Sunni Islam, rejecting many of the Nation's idiosyncratic teachings, including its claim that Fard Muhammad was Allah, that Elijah Muhammad had been a prophet, and its belief in the Myth of Yakub and a spaceship called the Mother Plane. He retained the Nation's themes of black pride, healthy diets, sexual modesty, and economic self-determination. "Temples" were renamed "mosques", while "ministers" were renamed "imams". The FOI was disbanded, with Wallace calling it a "hooligan outfit". Black nationalism was abandoned, and the ban on white people joining the Nation was lifted. Wallace Muhammad claimed that the Nation's old belief that the white man was the Devil referred to mental whiteness, a state that is rebelling against Allah, rather than light-skinned people themselves. He nevertheless retained the group's focus on raising the status of black people, inviting African Americans to call themselves "Bilalians" after the 7th-century African convert to Islam, Bilal ibn Rabah.

In November 1976, the Nation was renamed the World Community of al-Islam in the West, and in April 1978 it was renamed again, becoming the American Muslim Mission. Wallace Muhammad also renamed himself, first to Warith Deen and then to Warithuddin Muhammad. Wallace Muhammad claimed that these changes were in accordance with his father's intentions; he stated that he was in contact with Fard Muhammad, and that the founder had established the NOI's idiosyncratic beliefs as a means of gradually introducing Islamic teachings to African Americans, with the ultimate intention of bringing them to Sunni Islam. Most mosques remained with Wallace Muhammad during these reforms but some rejected them, seeking to return to the group's original teachings; small splinter groups emerged in Detroit, Atlanta, and Baltimore. In 1985, Wallace Muhammad disbanded his Mission, telling his followers to affiliate instead with their local mosques.

== Louis Farrakhan's revival ==
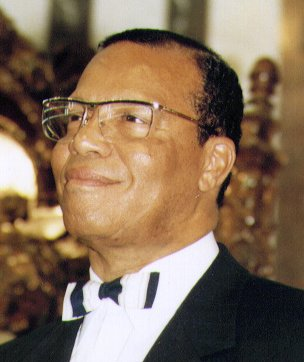
Louis Farrakhan, who re-established the Nation of Islam after leaving Wallace Muhammad's group in 1977

Leading the opposition to Wallace Muhammad's reforms was Louis Farrakhan, who, with other disaffected members, began rebuilding the Nation of Islam in 1977. Born in the Bronx to Caribbean migrants, Farrakhan had been a nightclub singer prior to joining the original Nation in 1955. In 1964 he had become minister of the NOI's Harlem Temple and in 1967 a national representative. Under Wallace Muhammad's leadership, Farrakhan was relocated to Chicago, widely seen as a demotion.

Farrakhan presented himself as Elijah Muhammad's true successor; his followers described Wallace Muhammad's leadership as "the Fall". Farrakhan's NOI spent the first several years focusing on rebuilding, re-establishing the Fruit of Islam, and buying much of the property owned by its predecessor, including the Chicago Palace. In 1979, Farrakhan launched a newspaper, The Final Call, which by 1994 had a circulation of 500,000. In 1981, Farrakhan's Nation held its first convention, and its membership began to increase rapidly in the mid-1980s.

Although criticizing Wallace Muhammad's wholesale embrace of Sunnism, Farrakhan introduced further elements of mainstream Islam into his Nation. In addition, he added further novel developments; Masonic elements and numerology came to play an important part in his speeches. He claimed that in 1985, while at Tepotzotlán in Mexico, he was teleported aboard the Mother Plane spaceship and there met with Elijah Muhammad—who was not really dead—and given advice on the Nation's future.

During the 1990s, Farrakhan was introduced to the ideas of the Church of Scientology and in 2006 he was honoured at the Church-sponsored Ebony Awakening Awards. In 2010, Farrakhan announced his embrace of Scientology's system of Dianetics and encouraged NOI members to undergo auditing from the Church. Farrakhan praised L. Ron Hubbard, founder of Dianetics and Scientology, stating that his ideas were "exceedingly valuable to every Caucasian person on this Earth", and presenting auditing as a method by which whites could purify themselves of their inherent badness.

Farrakhan's Nation expanded its international network, building links in Africa, and seeking a closer relationship with Muslims globally. By the late 1990s, Farrakhan's NOI opened its first mosques in Britain. Back in the US, the 1980s and 1990s saw growing numbers of rap and hip hop artists promote the Nation's message, despite Farrakhan's criticism of the heavy thematic use of sex, violence, and drugs in these genres. Concerned by gang violence, especially among African American youths, in 1989 Farrakhan launched his "Stop the Killing" campaign. He played a key role in getting two of the country's largest gangs, the Bloods and the Crips, to sign a ceasefire in 1992. Farrakhan also organized the 1995 Million Man March through Washington DC which united various African American groups to counter negative portrayals of black manhood. This proved the largest black demonstration in US history.
