= EmPATH unit =

American psychiatric emergency unit

EmPATH unit (Emergency Psychiatric Assessment, Treatment, and Healing) is an acronym for a specialized hospital-based emergency department or outpatient medical observation unit dedicated to mental health emergencies. Unlike standard emergency departments, EmPATH units gather their patients in chairs in a central room called a milieu.

EmPATH units were developed as a response to US emergency department overcrowding as large numbers of mental health patients were waiting for hours or days until they could be transferred to an inpatient psychiatric facility.

Moving psychiatric patients to a separate area for specialized emergency care opens emergency department beds for patients with medical emergencies and avoids the more confined structure of a standard emergency department which has been cited as a potential cause of worsening psychiatric patient symptoms. The open design of the EmPATH unit allows patients to move about freely, helping reduce stress. A study of the EmPATH unit at the University of Iowa Hospitals and Clinics has shown that patients need shorter stays, less inpatient care, and return to hospital less frequently. Other hospitals' EmPATH units have reported fewer than 25% of psychiatric emergency patients still require inpatient care after an EmPATH stay.

In their "Roadmap to the Ideal Crisis System", The National Council for Mental Wellbeing stated that there should be at least one EmPATH unit in every mental health system.

== History ==
The concept of EmPATH units was developed by Scott Zeller. For his work on EmPATH units, Healthcare Design magazine named him one of the "Top 10 People in Healthcare Design" in 2020 and the California Hospital Association awarded him the Ritz E. Heerman Memorial Award in 2019.
