= Medical observation =

Type of medical service

Medical observation is a medical service aimed at continued care of selected patients, usually for a period of 6 to 24 (sometimes more) hours, to determine their need for inpatient admission. This service is usually provided in emergency departments.

A patient held for observation is not admitted to the hospital, though there are certain similarities: patients will be checked in, pertinent information from the patient or their representative can be taken, and nurse(s) and doctor(s) from the given department may visit and a physical exam and personal and family history, and basic blood and imaging tests be conducted, and a bracelet for the observation period be given to the patient. However, they are not admitted formally to the hospital as an inpatient. They may be assigned a bed on the hospital's patient floors outside of the ER or the department they arrived in, or in a dedicated observation unit.

An EmPATH unit is a specialized type of hospital-based outpatient medical observation unit dedicated to mental health emergencies.

In the United States, some Medicare patients have spent several days as an outpatient in the hospital, but never officially being an inpatient in the hospital, which results in unexpected bills and makes them ineligible for Medicare payment for some future necessary services, especially skilled nursing care.

== See also ==
- Hospital bed
- Inpatient care
- Watchful waiting
