= Hospital bed =

Bed designed for hospital patients

Hospital beds per 1000 people

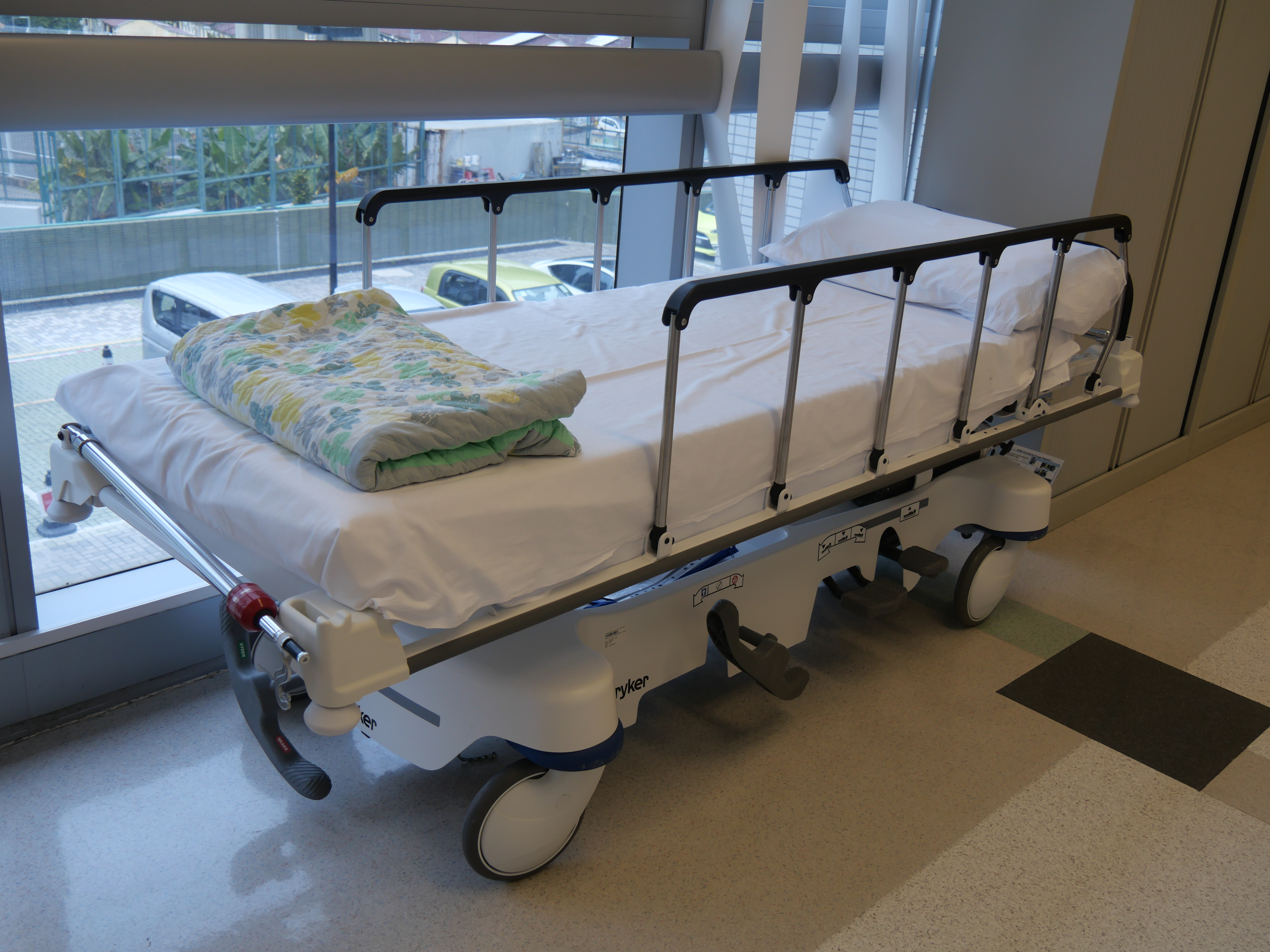
A modern hospital bed at a public hospital in Hong Kong

A hospital bed or hospital cot is a bed specially designed for hospitalized patients and others requiring health care. These beds have special features both for the comfort and well-being of the patient and for the convenience of health care workers. Common features include adjustable height for the entire bed, as well as for the head and foot sections. adjustable side rails, and electronic buttons to operate both the bed and other nearby electronic devices.

Hospital beds and similar beds, such as nursing care beds, are used not only in hospitals but also in other health care facilities and settings, such as nursing homes, assisted living facilities, outpatient clinics, and in home health care.

While the term hospital bed can refer to the actual bed, the term bed is also used to describe the amount of space in a health care facility, as the capacity for the number of patients at the facility is measured in available "beds".

There are various pros and cons for the different types of hospital beds, depending on the functions and features available, among other factors.

== History ==
Beds with adjustable side rails first appeared in Britain between 1815 and 1825.

In 1874 the mattress company Andrew Wuest and Son, Cincinnati, Ohio, registered a patent for a type of mattress frame with a hinged head that could be elevated, a predecessor of the modern day hospital bed.

The modern 3-segment adjustable hospital bed was invented by Willis Dew Gatch (1877-1962), chair of the Department of Surgery at the Indiana University School of Medicine, in 1909. This type of bed is sometimes referred to as the Gatch Bed. A crank mechanism was later added by Henry Ford.

The modern push-button hospital bed was invented in 1945, and it originally included a built-in toilet in hopes of eliminating the bedpan.

== Modern features ==
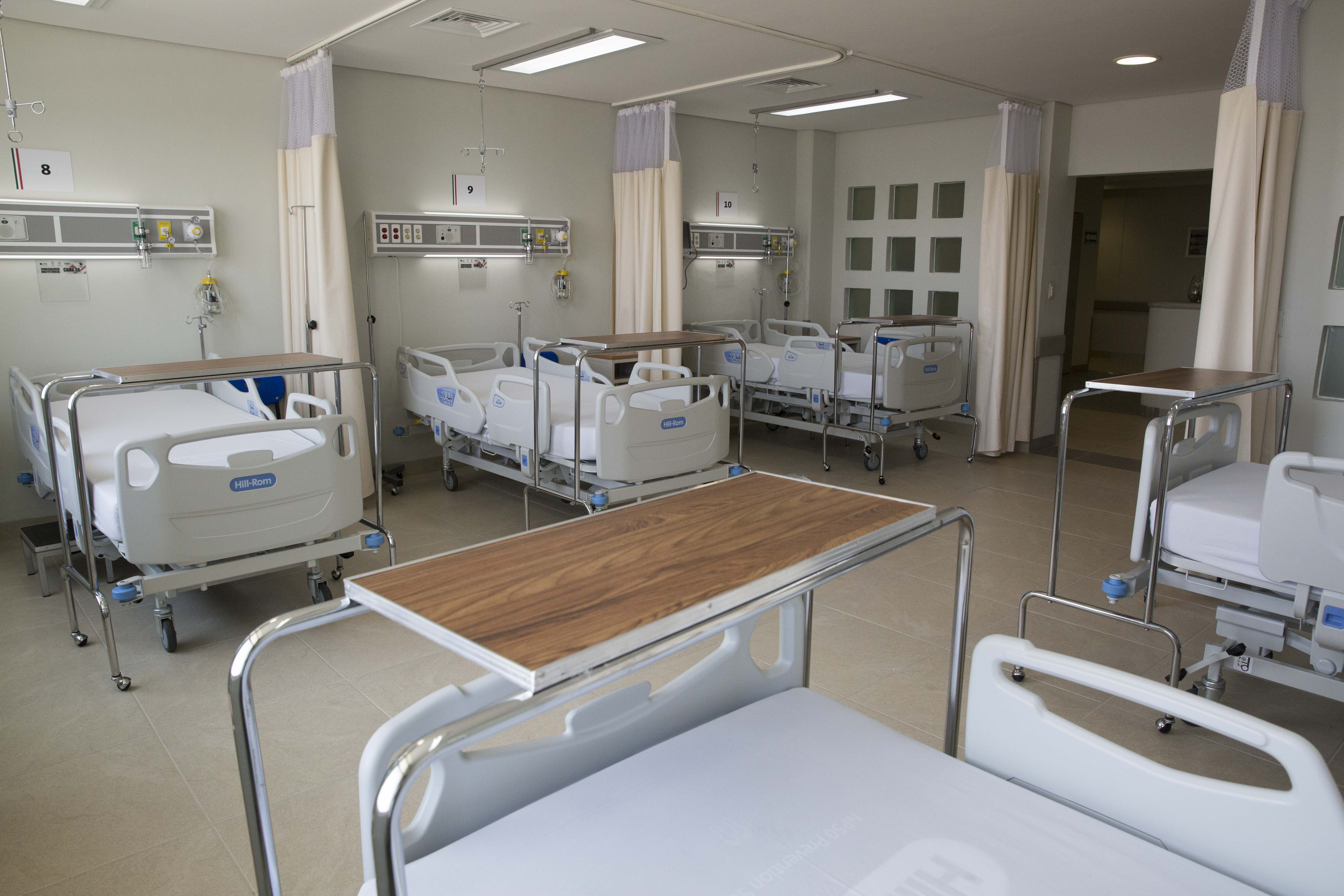
Hospital beds at the Hospital Regional de Apatzingán in Apatzingán, Michoacán, Mexico

=== Alternating pressure mattress ===
Alternating pressure mattresses use computer-controlled pumps to inflate and deflate automatically in order to lower the risk of bed sores.

=== Bed exit alarm ===
Many modern hospital beds feature a bed exit alarm whereby a pressure pad on or in the mattress activates an audible alert when a patient is placed on, and activating the full alarm once this weight is removed. This is helpful to hospital staff or caregivers monitoring multiple patients from a distance (such as a nurse's station) as the alarm will trigger in the event of a patient (especially the elderly or memory impaired) falling out of the bed or wandering off unsupervised. This alarm can be emitted solely from the bed itself or connected to the nurse call bell/light or hospital phone/paging system. Also some beds can feature a multi-zone bed exit alarm which can alert the staff when the patient start moving in the bed and before the actual exit which is necessary for some cases.

=== CPR function ===
In the event of the bed occupant suddenly requiring cardiopulmonary resuscitation, some hospital beds offer a CPR function in the form of a button or lever which when activated flattens the bed platform and lowers it to its lowest height and deflates and flattens the bed's air mattress (if installed) creating a flat hard surface necessary for CPR administration.

=== Elevation ===
Beds can be raised and lowered at the head, feet, and their entire height. While on older beds this is done with cranks usually found at the foot of the bed, on modern beds this feature is electronic.

Today, while a fully electric bed has many features that are electronic, a semi-electric bed has two motors, one to raise the head, and the other to raise the foot.

Raising the head (known as a Fowler's position) can provide some benefits to the patient, the staff, or both. The Fowler's position is used for sitting the patient upright for feeding or certain other activities, or in some patients, can ease breathing, or may be beneficial to the patient for other reasons.

Raising the feet can help ease movement of the patient toward the headboard and may also be necessary for certain conditions.

Raising and lowering the height of the bed can help bring the bed to a comfortable level for the patient to get in and out of bed, or for caregivers to work with the patient.

There are 5 function beds which include functions such as head elevation, foot elevation, Trendelenburg, reverse Trendelenburg positions with height adjustment options. These types of beds are typically used in ICUs and for patients who are high dependent.

=== Side rails ===
Beds have side rails that can be raised or lowered. These rails, which serve as protection for the patient and sometimes can make the patient feel more secure, can also include the buttons used for their operation by staff and patients to move the bed, call the nurse, or even control the television.

There are many types of side rails to serve different purposes. While some are simply to prevent patient falls, others have equipment that can aid the patient themself without physically confining the patient to bed.

Side rails, if not built properly, can be of risk for patient entrapment. In the United States, more than 300 deaths were reported as a result of this between 1985 and 2004. As a result, the Food and Drug Administration has set guidelines regarding the safety of side rails.

In some cases, use of the rails may require a physician's order (depending on local laws and the policies of the facility where they are used) as rails may be considered a form of medical restraint.

=== Specialist beds ===
Many specialist hospital beds are also produced to effectively treat different injuries. These include standing beds, turning beds and legacy beds. These are usually used to treat back and spinal injuries as well as severe trauma.

=== Tilting ===
Some advanced beds are equipped with columns which help tilt the bed to 15–30 degrees on each side. Such tilting can help prevent pressure ulcers for the patient, and help caregivers to do their daily tasks with less of a risk of back injuries.

=== Wheels ===
Wheels enable easy movement of the bed, either within parts of the facility in which they are located, or within the room. Sometimes movement of the bed a few inches to a few feet may be necessary in patient care.

Wheels are lockable. For safety, wheels can be locked when transferring the patient in or out of the bed.

== Disadvantages ==
=== Cost ===
Hospital bed prices vary widely depending on design, features, and weight capacity. Basic manual models typically start around US$1,000, while standard electric hospital beds generally range from US$1,500 to US$3,000. Advanced models with high–low functionality, multiple positioning motors, or clinical-grade features can exceed US$4,000. Bariatric hospital beds - designed for higher weight capacities and wider sleep surfaces - are usually priced higher than standard models.

For patients who require a hospital bed only for short-term recovery or home-based care, renting hospital bed may be a more economical alternative to purchasing. Rental services are offered in many countries through home healthcare equipment providers.

=== Effect on health of patients ===
Hospital beds can make a patient's spine more rounded because a patient who sits up a lot, such as when watching television, tends to slip down. Some of the category a bed manufacturers are providing their beds with a built-in function which acts as an anti-slip. LINET is providing Ergoframe while others have different names.

=== Safety ===
During the 1980s, patient safety had been a concern with hospital beds.

In 1982, a 3-year-old Milwaukee girl hospitalized for pneumonia was killed when crushed by a mechanical hospital bed.

In 1983, an 11-year-old Illinois boy was strangled to death by a hospital bed.

== See also ==
- Nursing care bed
- List of countries by hospital beds
- Inpatient care
- Medical observation
- Stretcher
