= Nursing care bed =

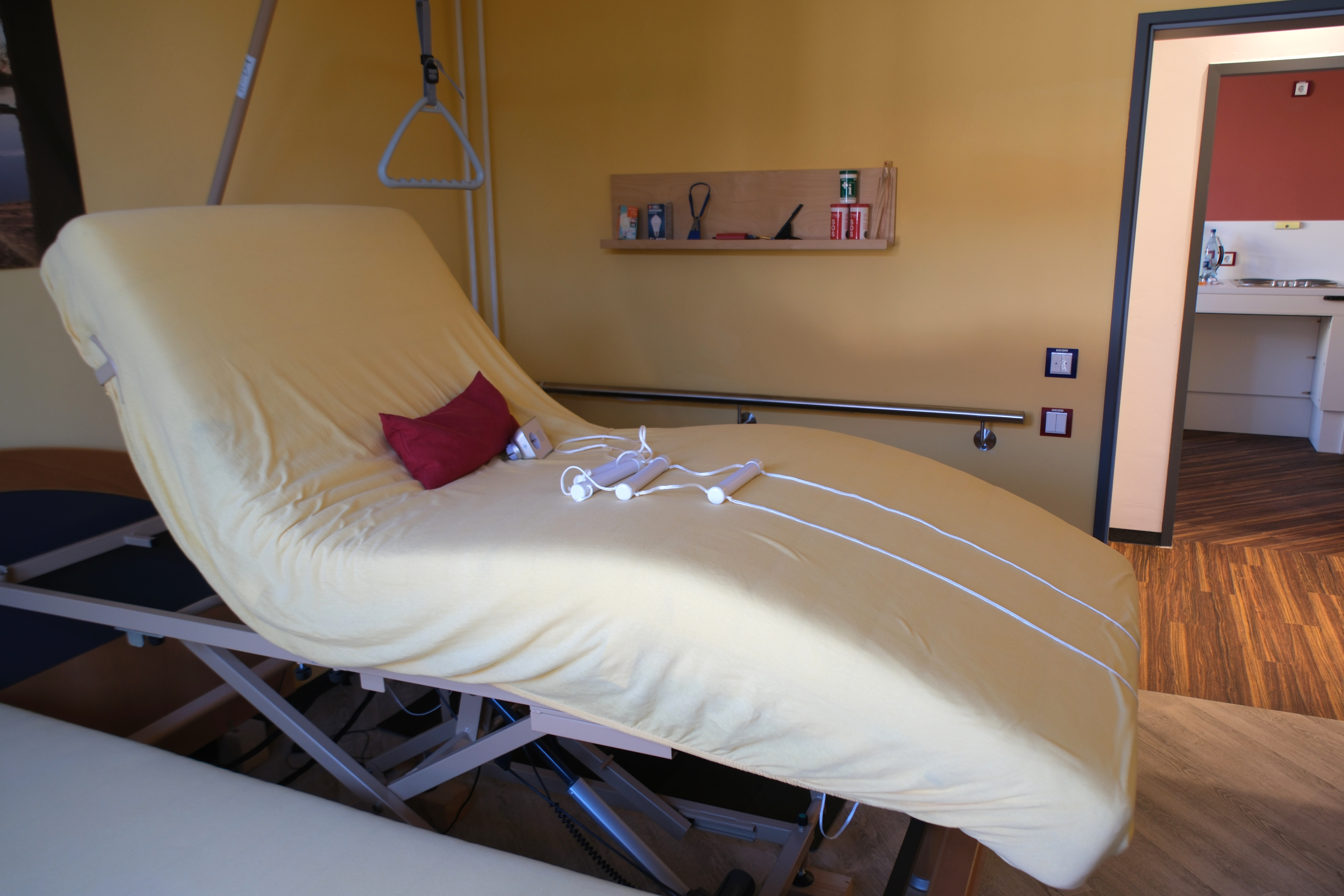
Musterwohnung TABEA - Roth 044

A nursing care bed (also nursing bed or care bed) is a bed that has been adapted to the particular needs of people who are ill or disabled. Nursing care beds are used in private home care as well as in inpatient care (retirement and nursing homes).

== Construction and functionality of nursing care beds ==
Typical characteristics of nursing care beds include adjustable lying surfaces, adjustable heights up to at least 65 cm for ergonomic care, and lockable castors with a minimum diameter of 10 cm. Multi-sectioned, often electronically powered lying surfaces can be adjusted to fit a variety of positions, such as comfortable sitting positions, shock positions or cardiac positions. Nursing care beds are also often equipped with pull-up aids (trapeze bars) and/or cot sides (side rails) to prevent falls.

Thanks to its adjustable height, the nursing care bed allows for both an ergonomic working height for nurses and healthcare therapists as well as a range of suitable positions allowing easy access for the resident.

== Specifications for nursing care beds ==
The development, manufacture and sale of nursing care beds are subject to the following regulations:

- ISO 14971 Medical devices. Risk analysis (see risk management)
- IEC 60601-1 Medical electrical equipment
- IEC 60601-2-38
- IEC 60601-2-52
- 93/42 EEC Directive medical devices
- 89/336 EEC Electromagnetic compatibility

== Special nursing care beds ==
Bed-in-bed

Bed-in-bed systems offer the option to retrofit the functionality of a nursing care bed into a conventional bed frame. A bed-in-bed system provides an electronically adjustable lying surface, which can be fitted into an existing bed frame replacing the conventional slatted frame. This enables the nursing care bed functionality to be fully integrated into the familiar bedroom furniture.

Hospital bed

Hospital beds provide all of the basic functions of a nursing care bed. However, hospitals have stricter requirements regarding hygiene as well as stability and longevity when it comes to beds. Hospital beds are also often equipped with special features (e.g. holders for IV devices, connections for intensive care, etc.).

Lie-low bed

This version of the nursing care bed allows the lying surface to be lowered close to the floor to prevent injury from falls. The lowest bed height in the sleeping position, usually about 25 cm above floor level, combined with a roll-down matt that can be placed at the side of the bed if needed – minimises the risk of injury if the resident falls out of the bed. Lie-low beds provide a viable alternative to conventional measures used in caring for restless residents by foregoing legally problematic restrictive measures (cot sides, fixation devices).

Ultra-low bed / floor bed

This is a further adaptation of the lie-low bed, with a lying surface that can be lowered to less than 10 cm above floor level, which ensures that the risk of injury is minimised if the resident falls out of the bed, even without a roll-down matt. In order to maintain and promote mobility, the particularly low height gives residents with limited motor ability the chance to independently return to bed by moving around on all fours, for example.

Intelligent nursing care bed / smart bed

Nursing care beds with technical equipment including sensors and notification functions are known as “intelligent” or “smart” beds.
Such sensors in intelligent nursing care beds can, for example, determine whether the user is in the bed, record the resident's movement profile or register damp in the bed. Those measurements are transmitted to the care givers via cables or wirelessly. The beds are connected to alarm functions and help care givers to assess the need for action.
Intelligent beds should contribute to improved care quality. For example, the documented sensor data regarding the intensity of movement in bed can help care givers recognise and make decisions about whether a resident should be moved to prevent bedsores.

== Bibliography ==
- Charity Johansson, Susan A. Chinworth, "Mobility in Context: Principles of Patient Care Skills", (F.A. Davis, 2012). ISBN 0803615272
