= Admission, discharge, and transfer system =

An admission, discharge, and transfer (ADT) system is a backbone system for the structure of other types of business systems. An ADT system is one of four types of core business systems: ADT, financial, scheduling, and acuity (McGonigle, D., & Mastrain, K., 2012). Core business systems are systems used in a health care facility for financial payment, quality improvement, and encouraging best practices that research has proven beneficial.

Used in health care, an ADT system is usually the foundation for other types of health care information systems because it holds valuable patient information such as a medical record number, age, name, and contact information. Using the ADT system, patient information can be shared, when appropriate, with other health care facilities and systems (McGonigle, D., & Mastrain, K., 2012). ADT systems can also be used as an alert system upon a patient's admission (Pittet, D., Safran, E., et al., 1996). This can be helpful if a patient has had a history of an infectious disease or heart ailments. When admitted, the ADT system may alert the admitting staff that the patient needs to be in an isolation room or on a cardiac floor, for example.
