= Murder of James J. Smith =

1932 crime in Detroit

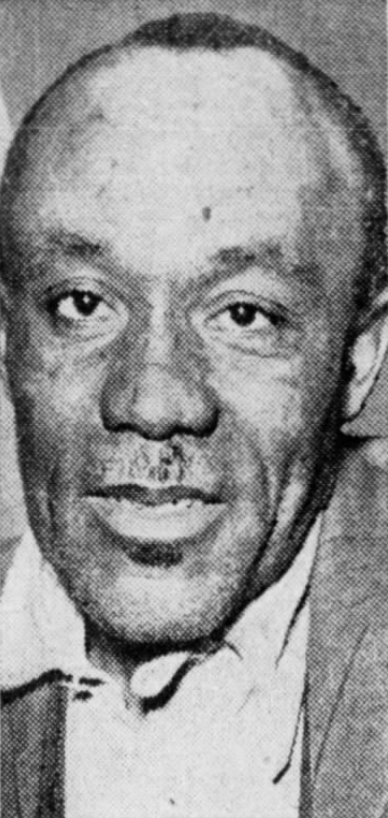
- Robert Karriem, perpetrator
- Date: November 20, 1932
- Time: Noon
- Location: 1429 DuBois Street, Detroit
- Also known as: Detroit Voodoo Murder
- Perpetrator: Robert Harris aka Robert Karriem
- Arrests: Robert and Bertha Harris (Karriem), Ugan Ali, and W.D. Fard
- Sentence: Robert Karriem committed to state hospital

The murder of James J. Smith occurred on November 20, 1932, when he was stabbed and bludgeoned to death by Allah Temple of Islam member Robert Karriem in what he described as a human sacrifice. Contemporary press labeled it the "Voodoo Murder". The killing led to the technical dissolution of the organization, which was reconstituted under the name Nation of Islam.

== Background ==
Robert Karriem was born Robert Harris on August 3, 1888, to parents Alec and Lulu in Mississippi. On July 3, 1929, he moved to Detroit, Michigan. He had a wife, Bertha. James Smith was born on December 25, 1892, in Atlanta.

In 1930, a man named W. D. Fard came to Detroit, ultimately founding a group called the Allah Temple of Islam. Among Fard's practices was to give new, Islamic names to members, replacing their inherited 'slave names'. Harris was given the new surname "Karriem".

== Killing ==
Around 9 a.m. on November 20, 1932, Robert Karriem had escorted James J. Smith into a room with a makeshift altar in the home at 1429 DuBois Street. Robert Karriem was described as a large 44 year old negro who had moved from Tennessee to Detroit on July 3, 1929. Smith, 40, was described as a negro. In the audience were twelve adult witnesses and Karriem's wife and children. Smith was asked if he would sacrifice his life for Islam, and Smith nodded his assent. Karriem then stabbed Smith in the chest, and proceeded to bludgeon him to death with an axle rod. (Note: Beynon stated that Fard's position on human sacrifice "was never made clear.")

Smith's body was found on the altar, stabbed through the chest with an 8-inch knife. A "cheap magazine" was open to a story about "mysticism of the desert", with the underlined phrase "The believer must be stabbed through the heart".

== Arrest ==
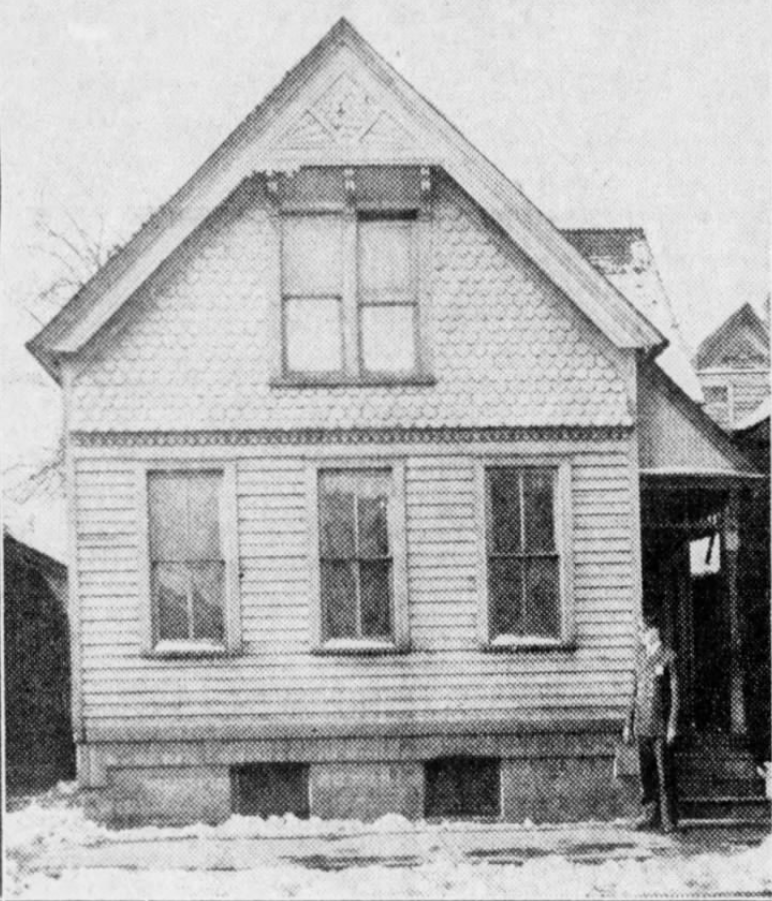
Policeman outside the house where the "Voodoo Murder" took place

After neighbors reported the crime and named Karriem as a likely suspect, Karriem and wife Bertha (35) were arrested at 2729 Clinton street. In custody, Karriem admitted to the slayings. Karriem told police: "I had to kill somebody, I could not forsake my gods". Karriem reportedly told police "The ninth hour of the twentieth day had come Sunday. It was predestined 1,500 years ago that at that hour I must make a human sacrifice to my gods. It must not be a member of the Order of Islam." Karriem claimed Smith assented to the sacrifice, telling police "At first he didn't want to be killed, but when I showed him that he would be the saviour of the world and go to heaven right away, he said all right."

Press on November 21 reported Karriem was the self-described "King" of a 100-member cult. Police initially suspected Karriem might be tied to the 1929 slaying of Benny Evangelista, whom press called a cult leader. Press ran a second story on the practice of Voodoo. Karriem explained "Smith was sitting in a chair in front of the altar. My wife was time-keeper. As the hour drew near, I said, 'Smith, do you still want to be killed?' because the command ordered me not to kill anybody who didn't want to be killed. Smith nodded his head. When it was just 12 o'clock, I said, 'Smith, get up and stand on the altar.' I grabbed my dirk (an eight-inch case knife) and stabbed him like this. Smith fell off the altar and started to groan and tried to get up. I hit him over the head with my 'rod of iron' (a section of the rear axle of an automobile)." Karriem recalled his children sobbed and begged him, "please, Daddy, don't do it, don't do it!"

On November 22, press coverage included a picture of the "Voodoo house" where the slaying had occurred. It was revealed that he had taken on the name "Karriem", referring to "Harris" as his 'slave name'. His son has likewise been renamed Hasabas. Hasabas, age 12, and daughter Ruby, 9, had been forced to witness the ritual. Press reported: "With an insane light in his eyes, he admitted that he had planned to seek out and kill Judges Edward J. Jeffries and Arthur E Gordon for the purpose of propitiating jungle gods." Karriem also reported wanting to kill a 21 year old social worker who had cut him from welfare rolls. Karriem was compared to the Ahfed Abdullah, formerly James Moaning, described as psychopathic, who had gained entrance to the Mayor's home in the delusional belief that the Mayor was responsible for the government of Haiti.

On November 23, press discussed police access to a temple on Hasting Street using a secret password, their raid on the temple, and their arrest of leader Ugan Ali, described as 'God of the Asiatics', after he admitted to having taught Karriem.

Police initiated a manhunt for Fard and another leader, Ugan Ali, who were arrested and questioned. Karriem was deemed insane and committed to a mental hospital. "The society cannot be blamed for anything he did", Ali was quoted as saying in the Detroit News. Fard and Ugan Ali, who acknowledged leadership of the Allah Temple of Islam but vehemently denied any teaching of human sacrifice, were examined by psychiatrist David Clark, who recommended they be committed for further observation. A judge agreed, and both Fard and Ugan Ali were placed in straitjackets and confined in padded cells.

With Fard and Ugan Ali still in custody five days after the murder, Elijah Muhammad, at the time known as Elijah Karriem, led over two hundred members into the court building and staged a protest on the main floor. The police spent a full day expelling the protesters.

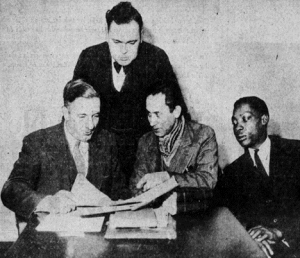
Fard Muhammad (center) showing a book to police detectives (left) while Fard's chief aide Ugan Ali (right) sits nearby

One contemporary news article claimed the murder was related to "the demoniac rites of West African savages, from whom Voodoo practices were transferred to West Indian Negroes, and from them to the United States."

== Aftermath ==
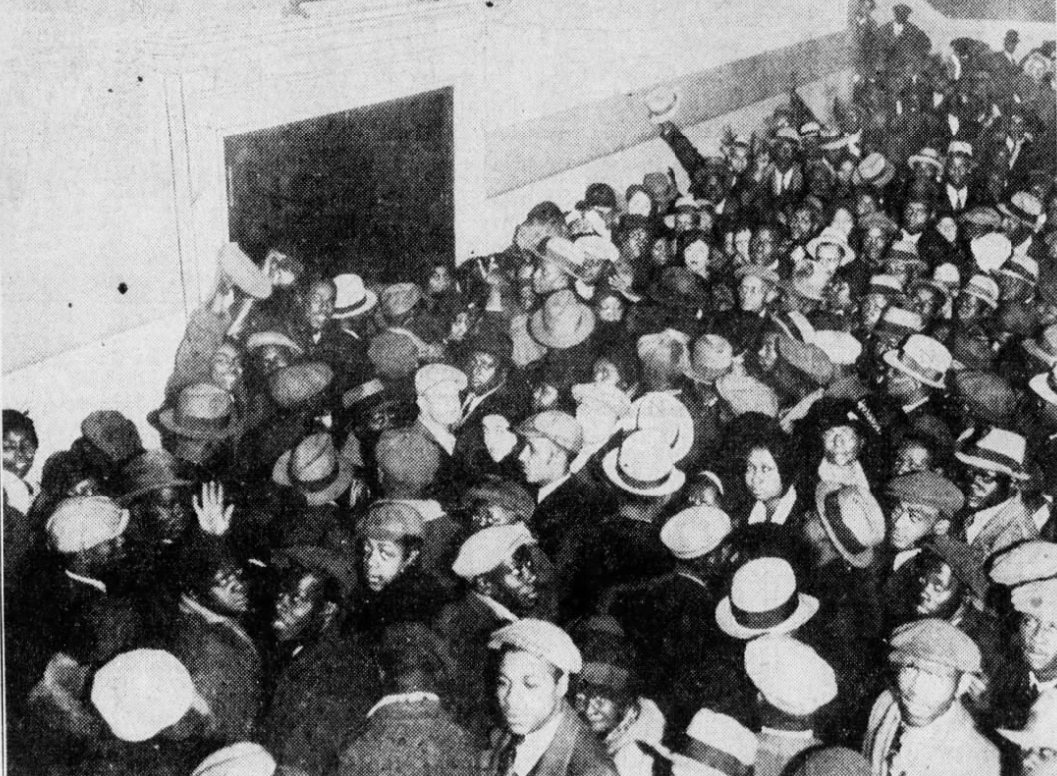
Overflow crowd at arraignment of Robert Karriem

On November 25, Karriem was arraigned on charges of first-degree murder; he pleaded guilty, but his bizarre courtroom behavior convinced witnesses of his insanity. Judge John P. Scallen appointed three psychiatrists. Karriem was described as throwing furniture at other prisoners.

Papers described Karriem's confinement in a padded cell of the County Jail, writing "The lustful flame of jungle fanaticism which tortured Harris into murdering Smith, seemed to have died away in him, temporarily at least, Saturday [November 26]." On November 28, "Negro leaders" in Detroit publicly voiced opposition to the "cult". By November 29, police had seized ATI literature including a registry of 8,000 members.

On November 30, papers reported that Ugan Ali was likely insane, while Fard was reported as "not driven into his sinister teaching through insanity". On December 1, papers announce that the roster of ATI members had been conveyed to the Welfare Departments; Recipients were to be banned from welfare if they retained their membership. On December 6, the three psychiatrists testified that Karriem was legally insane, and he was committed to the Ionia State Hospital for the Criminal Insane. On December 6, Ugan Ali was released after promising to help disband the Allah Temple of Islam, while Fard agreed to forever leave Detroit as a condition of release.

In the state hospital, Karriem was diagnosed with dementia praecox. He died there on June 19, 1935, of "mitral insufficiency and decompensation". His body was transferred to the Department of Anatomy at the University of Michigan in Ann Arbor.
