= Al Aghani Radio =

Egyptian radio station

- Country: Egypt
- Broadcast area: Middle East
- Headquarters: Cairo, Egypt

Programming
- Format: Arab music

History
- Launch date: June 17, 2000

Coverage
- Stations: Cairo 105.8 – Alexandria 97.6 – Delta 89.2 – Marsa Matrouh 92.6 – Hurghada 98.2 – Safaga 89.8 – Minya 104.6 – Asyut 102 – Sohag 92.8 – Qena 96.8 – Nag Hammadi 94.1

Al Aghani Radio (Arabic: إذاعة الأغاني, also known as Elaghany or simply Aghani) is an Egyptian radio station devoted to music. It opened on 17 June 2000 by then-director of Egyptian Radio Hamdi Al-Kanisi. The station offers all sorts of popular music programming, including Arabic pop music, nasheed, and children's music. With the goal of presenting the heritage of Arabic music to a global audience but especially to Egypt and the rest of the Middle East, the station broadcasts throughout the Republic on the following FM frequencies: Cairo 105.8, Alexandria 97.6, Marsa Matruh 92.6, Hurghada 98.2, Safaga 89.8, Minya 104.6, Asyut 92.6, Sohag 92.8, and Qena 96.8. Additionally, Nilesat broadcasts throughout the region on 11765 MHz AM, and for a time the station had a global Internet feed (once at http://www.elaghany.com/Radio/de.htm).

== History ==
To celebrate the 11th anniversary of Egyptian Media Production City on 17 June 2000, then-President of Egypt Hosni Mubarak officially launched three new stations: News and Music, Al Aghani, and Adult Radio (later called the Specialized Radio Network and devoted to sports and talk). Al-Kanisi initially managed broadcasting of news on FM 91.5 from 8:00 AM to noon and from 6:00 to 10:00 PM, while music was broadcast on FM 105.8 from 2:00 PM to 2:00 AM, and Adult Radio used 89.5 FM. The three stations were set to be evolving and dynamic, presenting all sorts of music interspersed with news bulletins every half hour.

The growth of specialized media internationally led Minister of Information Safwat El-Sherif to suggest the Specialized Radio Network, a counterpart to the growing television outlet Al Nile. Maher Mustafa, head of the Network, aimed the stations’ programming toward Africa, the Middle East, and Europe along the Mediterranean Sea.

Early programming on Al Aghani aired from 2:00 pm to 2:00 am and started each day with a patriotic song, continuing with light music, then youth music. From 4:00 to 5:30 pm, songs from films and television series were showcased. A show airing from 5:30 to 6:45 pm focused on long recorded performances by legends such as Umm Kulthum, Mohammed Abdel Wahab, Abdel Halim Hafez, Warda Al-Jazairia, Nagat El-Sagheera, Farid al-Atrash, Shadia, and Fayza Ahmed. One singer at a time was featured on a show from 6:45 to 7:15 pm, followed until 8:45 pm by a mix of short poems, famous duets, and light monologues from actors like Ismail Yassine and Thoraya Helmy. Youth music and Arabic pop aired from 8:45 to 10:00 pm. 10:00 to 10:30 pm played host to a grab bag of young groups, answer songs, songs on a theme or from movies, covers, original live recordings, and actors. An oldies show catered from 10:30 to 11:30 pm to fans of Abdel Ghani al-Sayed, Riad Al Sunbati, Abbas Al-Blaidi, Mohamed Qandil, Abdel Aziz Mahmoud, Houria Hassan, Shahrazad, and Ahlam, among others. Finally, late-night concerts of Umm Kulthum from the vaults closed things out into the early morning. Transmission gradually shifted to start at 7:00 am and eventually become 24-hour.

== Staff ==
Mohamed Jarrah served as General Supervisor with Sherif Abbas to assist him as general manager. Other members of the team included Tariq Mustafa, Nasser Rashwan, Ibrahim Hefni, Sherif Abbas, Amal Abd al-Latif, Nashwa Muhammad Ali, Hala Rostam, Hanan Sorour, Manal al-Khuli, Nahid Shalqami, Rasha Salam, Maha Rostom, Ahmed Nayel, Lubna Ahmed, Ahmed Montaser, Maria Wajih, Rania Abouzeid, May Ashoush, Majidah Suleiman, Dawlat Abul Fotouh, Hassan Hamdi Saif Al-Nasr, Muhammad Ashour, Manal Hassan, Iman Al-Prince, Doaa Salah El-Din, Sherine Lotfi, Fouad Muhammad, Suha Taha, Ahmed Nader, Ahmed Sabry, Rasha Mukhtar, Heba Al-Saeed, Tamer Ezz El-Din, Mohamed Turki, and Ali Abdel Aal.

== Programs ==
=== Munta Al Tarab ===
The show منتهـى الطـرب ("Munta al Tarab," lit. "The End of the Ritual"), presented by Ibrahim Hafni on Thursdays from 8:00 to 10:00 pm when it started in 2011, was eventually reduced to one hour. This regionally popular show commemorated rare performances and forgotten songs.

- Wayback Machine copy of official show site from 2014

=== Kan Yama Kan ===
كـان ياما كـان ("Kan Yama Kan") was hosted by Tariq Mustafa from 10:00 to 11:00 pm on Friday evenings. The program narrates his memories of famed singers in between songs.

- Machine copy of official show site from 2014

=== Hour of Rapture with Arab Stars ===
ساعة طرب مع نجوم العرب ("Hour of Rapture with Arab Stars") is hosted by Maha Rostom and edited by Sayed Abdel Aziz. The program showcases contemporary singers from around the region. The show's followers on social media hail from Tunisia, the United Arab Emirates, Kuwait, Morocco, Algeria, Yemen, Saudi Arabia, Lebanon, Syria, Bahrain, Oman, and elsewhere. According to a blurb from Chouf TV,

Don't miss this show, famous around the Arab world and press for forty episodes now; nearly thirty newspapers around the region have commented on it as one of Egyptian Radio's top programs.

The show airs at 8:00 to 9:00 pm on Tuesday nights.

=== Other highlights ===
- سيرة الحب ("Love Story"): Hefni narrating artist biographies, 2002
- حكايتى مع الغناء ("My Story of Singing"): Magda Soliman hosting a top show with top singers, 2002
- ألوان ("Colors"): Hefni covering Arab music writ large, 2005
- تاتا أغاني ("Tata Songs"): Amani Bakir hosting a children's music talk show, 2006
- كنوز ("Treasures"): Nasser Rashwan's music show, 2007
- شاعر وألحان ("Poet and Songwriter"): Live talk show with Amal Abdel Latif, Amr Sabry, and Mohsen Arafa, 2007
- جعلونى مطربا ("They Made Me a Singer"): Hefni hosting a talent contest, Ramadan 2007
- سلطنة ("Sultanate"): Mustafa hosting a show around rarities
- سمع هوس ("Obsessions Heard"): Hend Lofty hosting a talk show with notable artistic figures, 2007
- أغنية مشهورة ("Popular Song"): Hefni presenting a comedy show, 2008
- يا مغنواتى ("Oh, My Singer!"): Sabry hosting a talent competition, 2008
- أنت فين ("Where Are You?"): Nariman El-Gohary hosting a talk show with left-field artists, 2008
- فكر ثوانى وأكسب أغاني ("Think Seconds and Win Songs"): Arafa's singing competition, 2008
- أرابيسك ("Arabesque"): Sabry presenting traditional music during Ramadan, 2008
- صوت في الزحمة ("Voice in the Crowd"): Sabry, Kholoud Nader, and Ahmed Montaser hosting a youth program from 8:00 to 10:00 pm on Fridays, 2010–13
- هنعيشها أحلى ("We Will Live It Better"): Lubna Ahmed hosts a youth talk show discussing youth problems with specialists, 2011
- هـى الليالى كـدا ("These Are the Nights Like That"): Rashwan hosting a show from 10:00 to 11:00 pm on Tuesdays
- نجــوم وراء نجـوم ("Stars Behind the Stars"): Ahmed hosting a show from 10:00 to 11:00 pm on Saturdays, 2011–13
- دوزان ("Dozan"): Majidah Suleiman hosting a show from 10:00 to 11:00 pm on Thursdays, 2011–13
- كلمات في الاغنيات ("Song Lyrics"): Hanan Sorour hosting a show from 5:15 to 7:00 pm on Mondays, 2012–13
- حنين إلـى كـل قديم ("Nostalgia for All the Old"): Abdel Latif hosting a show from 8:00 to 10:00 pm Sundays, 2011–13
- مزيكـــا فرينيـــا ("Music Vernia"): Ahmed Nayel hosting a show from 1:00 to 3:00 am on Thursdays and Fridays, 2011–13
- في يوم من الايام ("One Day"): Mustafa hosting a show, 2011–13
- سؤال يسلم سؤال ("A Question Yields Another"): Manal Al-Khouli hosting a call-in game show, 2011–13
- بمناسبة ومن غير مناسبة ("Mark It as Inappropriate"): Enas Gohar hosting interviews with major Egyptian and other Arab pop stars, 2011–13, then moved to Middle East Radio

== Managers ==
Under two directors, Al Aghani Radio flourished from 2000 to 2009, but encountered a rough patch from 2009 to 2013. Amid mounting criticism throughout the region, Information Minister Doria Sharaf El-Din formally reopened the station on 7 September 2013 (in the wake of the 2013 Egyptian coup d'état that brought Abdel Fattah el-Sisi to power). A more purist emphasis took hold from August 2015, highlighted by celebrations of the opening of the expanded Suez Canal. The following people have run Al Aghani:

1. Nabila Mustafa Makkawi served as Director-General from 17 June 2000 to June 2006
2. Information Minister Anas el-Fiqqi appointed Mohsen Arafa in June 2006, and he would hold the post until 24 June 2009
3. Al-Fiqi replaced Arafa with Naglaa Ghannam on 24 June 2009, and she would hold the post until September 2013, including the entire presidency of Mohamed Morsi
4. Muhammad Nawar served as interim director from September to December 2013
5. Tariq Mustafa, a long-time staffer, directed Al Aghani from December 2013 to 4 August 2015
6. Sonia Mahmoud was general manager from 4 August 2015 to February 2019
7. Muhammad Jarrah and Sherif Abbas have directed Al Aghani since March 2019

== Website ==
The website www.elaghany.com was opened in March 2012, proposed a long time earlier by Sayed Abdel Aziz. The site provided high-quality Internet radio and a comment page for direct listener feedback.

== After 7 September 2013 ==
The new emphasis was brought to bear in a special presentation in honor of Armed Forces Day, 6 October 2013, reported in the pages of Al-Ahram as a collection of songs about "victory and crossings." On 31 May 2014, more documentaries were produced, such as one on the life of Abdel Halim Hafez that was timed to air on his birthday on 21 June of that year and produced by Abdel Aziz with Maha Rostom hosting.

== Awards and Ratings ==
- In January 2015, Al Aghani earned the top listening statistics among Internet radio stations according to Alexa Internet
- In June 2015, Al Aghani was noted as the third-highest-rated station in the country according to the ERTU
- In February 2016, Al Aghani was rated the most preferred station among the Egyptian public by an Ipsos poll
