= Armed Forces Day =

National holidays honoring military forces

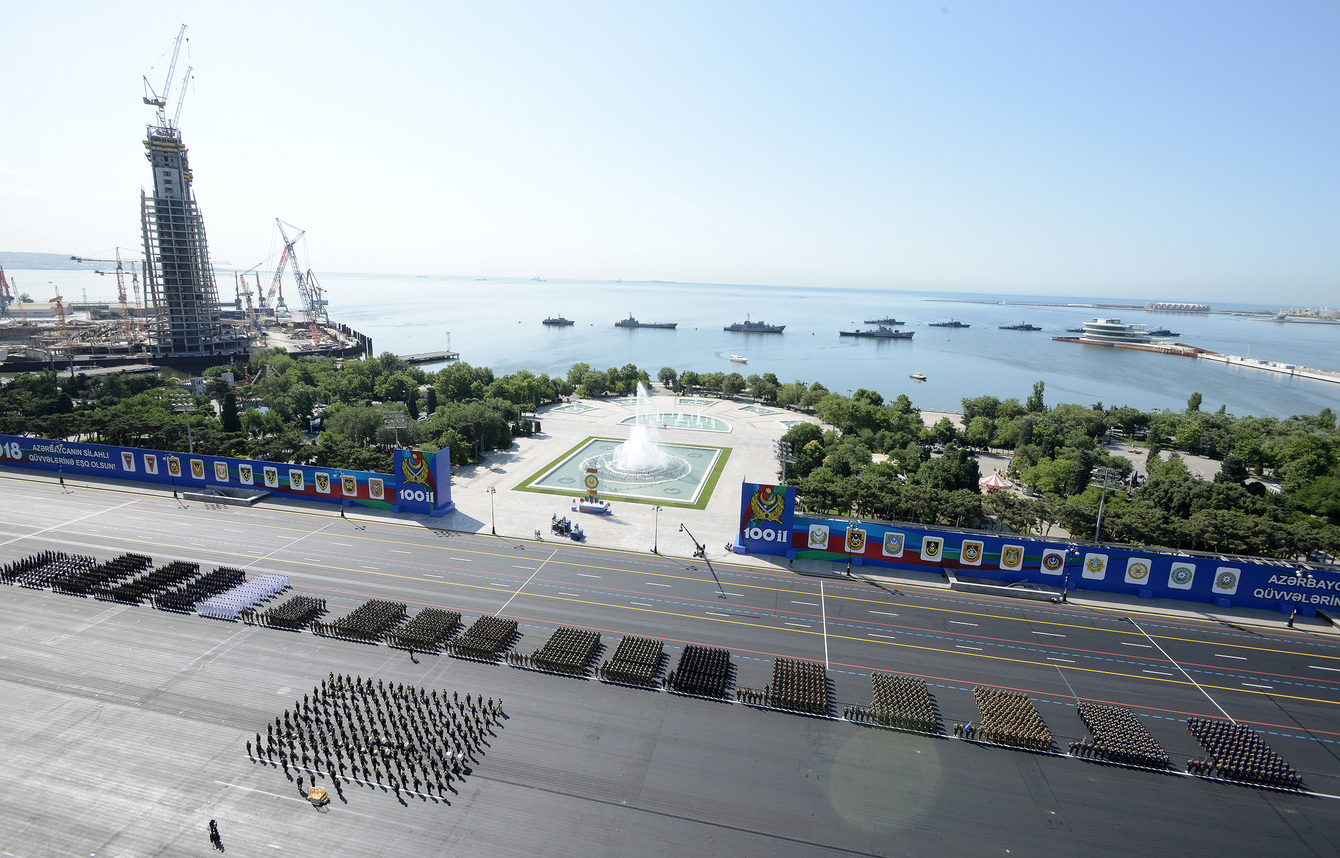
Armed Forces Day in Azerbaijan.

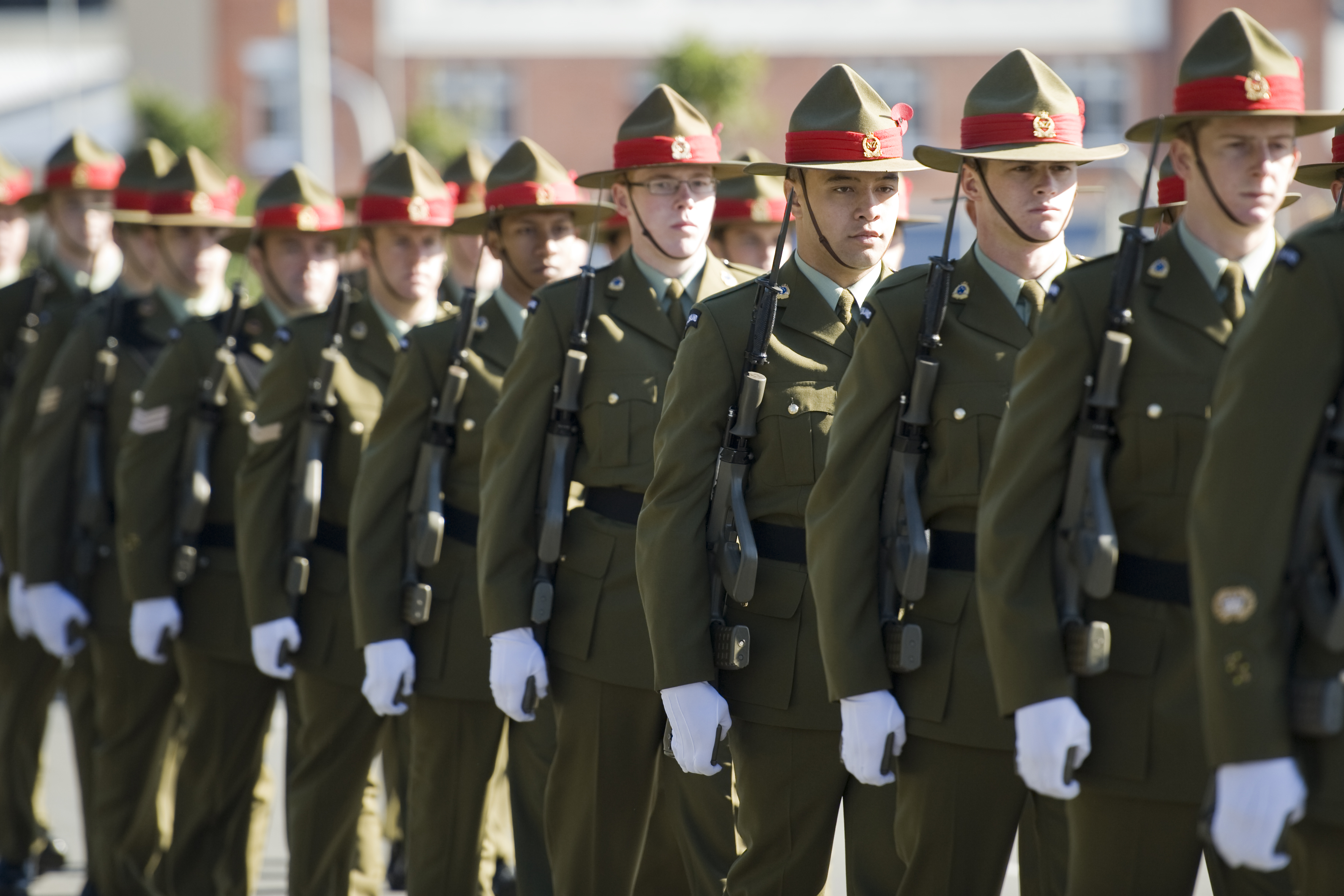
An Anzac Day National Commemorative Service at the National War Memorial in Wellington.

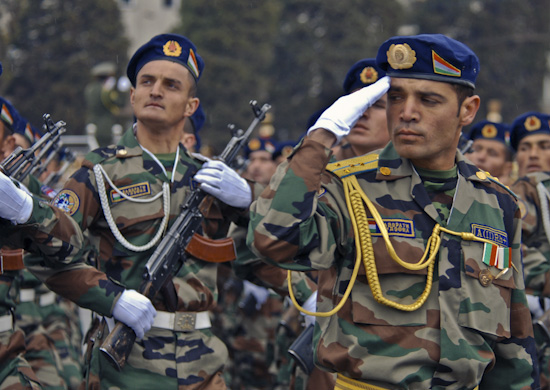
Tajik National Army Day.

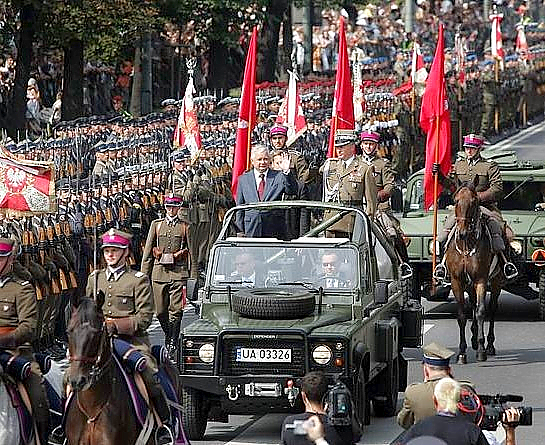
Polish President Lech Kaczyński reviewing troops during an armed forces day parade in Warsaw in 2007.

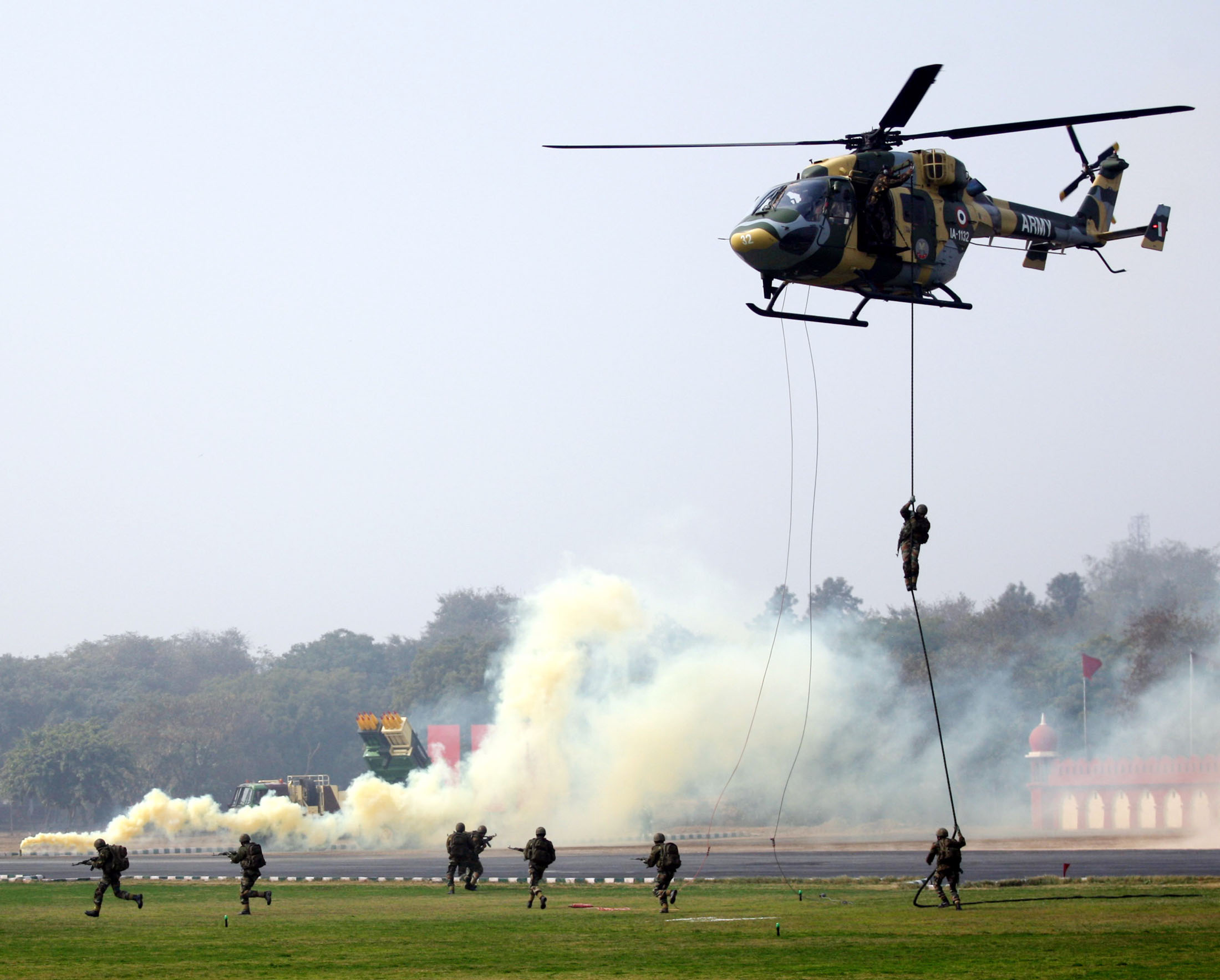
Army soldiers conduct a drill at the Army Day parade in New Delhi on 15 January 2013

An Armed Forces Day, alongside its branch-specific variants often referred to as Army or Soldier's Day, Navy or Sailor's Day, and Air Force or Aviator's Day, is a holiday dedicated to honoring the armed forces, or one of their branches, of a sovereign state, including their personnel, history, achievements, and sacrifices. It's often patriotic or nationalistic in nature, carrying information value outside of the conventional boundaries of a military's subculture and into the wider civilian society. Many nations around the world observe this day. It is usually distinct from a Veterans or Memorial Day, as the former is dedicated to those who previously served and the latter is dedicated to those who perished in the fulfillment of their duties.

== Africa ==
=== Egypt ===
In Egypt, Armed Forces Day is celebrated on 6 October, the date on which the Yom Kippur War of 1973 began with the Egyptian Army's successful crossing of the Suez Canal that culminated in the capture of the Bar Lev Line.

=== Liberia ===
Armed Forces Day is celebrated on 11 February.

=== Mali ===
Mali Armed Forces Day is celebrated on 20 January.

=== Mauritania ===
Mauritanian Armed Forces Day is celebrated on 10 July. Armed Forces Day is marked with events of national importance, such as flag raising ceremonies, awards ceremonies and military parades. It was established in 1960 by President Moktar Ould Daddah as a professional holiday for the armed forces, replacing the holidays of the separate branches of the armed forces, as well as resembling the Remembrance Day celebrations in the United Kingdom. It is not a public holiday in the country.

=== Nigeria ===
In Nigeria, Armed Forces Day, also known as Remembrance Day, is celebrated on 15 January. It was formerly celebrated on 11 November of every year to coincide with the Remembrance Day (Poppy Day) for the World War II veterans in the British Commonwealth of Nations. But it was changed to 15 January in Nigeria in commemoration of the surrender of Biafran troops to the Federal troops on 15 January 1970, thus concluding the Nigerian Civil War that sought to tear apart the unity of Nigeria.

=== Somalia ===
Somali Armed Forces Anniversary is celebrated on 12 April as the Armed Forces were founded on 12 April 1960. The branches of Armed Forces conduct a military parade in the Ministry of Defence's campus each year.

=== South Africa ===
Armed Forces Day for the South African National Defence Force is celebrated on 21 February, the day of the 1993 reconstitution of the South African Defence Force into its current identity. It has been celebrated with parades nationwide since 2012. Since 2017, the Armed Forces Day event also honors the fallen of the tragic 1917 sinking of SS Mendi, which carried South African forces into the frontlines during the First World War, resulting in one of the biggest military losses ever in South African military history.

== Americas ==
=== Argentina ===
In Argentina, the commemorative dates of the Armed Forces are as follows:

- 17 May: Argentine Navy Day
- 29 May: Argentine Army Day
- 10 August: Argentine Air Force Day

=== Bolivia ===
Bolivian Armed Forces Day (Spanish: Dia de las Fuerzas Armadas de Bolivia) is marked on 7 August, the day after Independence Day, as it was the day in 1826 when Bolivia's first President, Antonio José de Sucre, officially gave his sanction to the creation of the Armed Forces of Bolivia.

=== Brazil ===
In Brazil, the commemorative dates of the Armed Forces are as follows:

Brazilian Navy (Portuguese: Marinha do Brasil):

- 11 June – Brazilian Navy Day (Portuguese: Data Magna da Marinha do Brasil)
- 13 December – Sailor's Day (Portuguese: Dia do Marinheiro)

Brazilian Army (Portuguese: Exército Brasileiro):

- 19 April – Brazilian Army Day (Portuguese: Dia do Exército)
- 25 August – Soldier's Day (Portuguese: Dia do Soldado)

Brazilian Air Force (Portuguese: Força Aérea Brasileira):

- 23 October – Aviator's Day (Portuguese: Dia do Aviador)

=== Canada ===
In Canada, Canadian Armed Forces Day (CAFD) (French: Journée des forces armées canadiennes) is celebrated on the first Sunday in June and is a celebration of Canada's armed services, their heritage, and their personnel. It was established as a result of passing of a motion in the House of Commons on 25 April 2002. Canadian Armed Forces Day is not a public holiday in Canada. Official congratulations are given by the Commander-in-Chief of the Canadian Forces, the Prime Minister of Canada, the Minister of National Defence, and the Chief of the Defence Staff. An inspection of an inter-service guard of honour is commonplace during the holiday. Tributes to CF personnel usually happen at the National War Memorial and the Canadian Tomb of the Unknown Soldier in Ottawa. The event is similar to the Remembrance Day celebrations in the fall. In 2018, CFB Borden organized an air show for the holiday.

=== Chile ===
In Chile, Army Day (Spanish: Día de las Glorias del Ejército) is a national holiday celebrated every 19 September, a day after the independence day, with the Gran Parada Militar, a military parade where all the branches of the armed forces display some of their troops and equipment in a special part of O'Higgins Park in Santiago. Several other smaller parades can be seen in other cities of the country, as well as air displays by the air force, on Independence Day, 18 September.

For the Chilean Navy, its counterpart is the national Navy Day (Spanish: Día de las Glorias de la Armada) celebrations on 21 May, in honor of the double anniversaries of the Battle of Iquique and the Battle of Punta Gruesa in 1879. Valparaíso is where the main celebrations are concentrated, with a military parade in the morning and the President of Chile's State of the Nation address in the afternoon. Similar parades are hosted in major and minor cities and towns nationwide.

=== Colombia ===
In Colombia, Army Day (Spanish: Día del Ejército Nacional) is celebrated every 7 August, in commemoration of the Battle of Boyacá (1819) which led to the expulsion of most of the Spanish Forces in the country. The Colombian Army holds a military ceremony on the site of the battle to commemorate its anniversary. It was established as a result of a presidential decree by President Alfonso López Michelsen in 1978 (decreto No 1461 de 1978).

For the Colombian Navy, it celebrates Navy Day (Spanish: Día de la Armada de Colombia) every 24 July, in commemoration of the Battle of Lake Maracaibo in 1823 led by Colombian Admiral José Prudencio Padilla. A Naval Review is held in the main naval bases in the Pacific and Caribbean, with the main celebrations concentrated in the Bay of Cartagena where the largest Naval Review is held.

=== Cuba ===
The Day of the Cuban Armed Forces is celebrated on 2 December to commemorate the landing of the Granma in 1956. The first ever military parade in years to be held on the holiday was marked in 2006. The parade on 2 January 2017 (postponed for 1 month due to the Death and state funeral of Fidel Castro) was the second and the final event marking the diamond jubilee since the events of 1956.

=== Dominican Republic ===
Armed Forces Day (Spanish: Día de las Fuerzas Armadas) is celebrated on 25 February to commemorate the anniversary of the armed forces of the Dominican Republic. It is also the day of birth of Matías Ramón Mella, who is regarded as a national hero in the Dominican Republic and fired the first shot with his blunderbuss to proclaim, along with other patriots, the Independence from Haiti on 27 February 1844. On 27 February a military parade is held to commemorate the Independence anniversary.

=== Ecuador ===
In Ecuador, the commemorative dates of the Armed Forces are as follows:

Ecuadorian Army (Spanish: Ejército Ecuatoriano):

- 27 February – Ecuadorian Army Day (Spanish: Día del Ejército Ecuatoriano), in commemoration of the Battle of Tarqui (1829)

Ecuadorian Navy (Spanish: Armada Nacional del Ecuador):

- 25 July – Ecuadorian Navy Day (Spanish: Día de la Armada Nacional del Ecuador), in commemoration of the Battle of Jambelí (part of the Ecuadorian–Peruvian War, 1941)

Ecuadorian Air Force (Spanish: Fuerza Aérea Ecuatoriana):

- 27 October – Anniversary of foundation (1920)

=== Guatemala ===
In Guatemala, Día del Ejército is celebrated on 30 June. It is remembered because in 1871 the Liberal Revolution or "Revolución Liberal", led by Miguel García Granados and Justo Rufino Barrios, and composed of personnel of the Guatemalan Army, marched on the streets of Guatemala City and captured the Presidential palace, putting an end to the Conservadora administration formerly headed by Rafael Carrera, marking the start of a new era in Guatemalan history. Parades are held in honor of the holiday in Guatemala City and in other major towns nationwide.

=== Haiti ===
In Haiti, Le Jour de La Battaille Des Vertieres is celebrated on 18 November in celebration of the victory of the indigenous slave African and Gens de couleur versus the European forces led by France with support from United States and Spain.

=== Mexico ===
Mexican Armed Forces Day (Spanish: Día del Ejercito) is celebrated on 19 February since 1950, in commemoration of the decree that created them in 1917.

=== Peru ===
In Peru, the Día de las Fuerzas Armadas del Perú (English: Peruvian Armed Forces Day) is celebrated on 24 September, the feast of the Virgin of Mercy, patroness of the Armed Forces. The day for the Peruvian Army itself is 9 December, commemorating Peru's victory in the Battle of Ayacucho, which ended the Peruvian War of Independence, while for the Peruvian Navy, Navy Day is on 8 October, the double anniversary of the 1821 foundation of the Navy and the Battle of Angamos in 1879.

Air Force Day is held on 23 July, the anniversary of the death of Peruvian Air Force Lieutenant José Quiñones Gonzales during the 1941 Ecuadorian–Peruvian War.

The Great Military Parade of Peru is held on the day after Independence Day, 29 July, and this is where all 3 services of the Armed Forces are also honored.

=== United States ===
In the United States, Armed Forces Day is celebrated on the third Saturday in May. It falls near the end of Armed Forces Week, which begins on the second Saturday of May and ends on the third Sunday of May (or the fourth, if the month begins on a Sunday, as in 2016).

Because of their unique training schedules, National Guard and reserve units may celebrate Armed Forces Day/Week over any period in the month of May.

First observed on 20 May 1950, the day was created on 31 August 1949 as President Harry S. Truman led the effort to establish a single holiday for citizens to come together and thank military members for their patriotic service in support of the republic and national interests and as an undeniable fact of American life. Secretary of Defense Louis A. Johnson announced the creation to honor Americans serving in the five U.S. military branches – the U.S. Army, U.S. Navy, U.S. Marine Corps, U.S. Air Force and U.S. Coast Guard – following the consolidation of the military services in the U.S. Department of Defense as part of a modern U.S. Armed Forces. It was intended to replace the separate Army, Navy, Air Force, Marine Corps and Coast Guard holidays, but the separate days are still observed, especially within the respective services. The first Armed Forces Day was celebrated by parades, open houses, receptions and air shows. The United States' longest continuously running Armed Forces Day Parade is held in Bremerton, Washington.

On 19 May 2017, President Donald Trump reaffirmed the Armed Forces Day holiday, marking the 70th anniversary since the creation of the Department of Defense. On 15 May 2020, Armed Forces Day honored the newly established United States Space Force for the first time.

Aside from the Armed Forces Day, the Armed Forces and the National Guard Bureau are honored on the following days:

- 29 March: National Vietnam War Veterans Day (general commemoration in the Armed Forces)
- Last Monday of May: Memorial Day
- 14 June: Flag Day and U.S. Army Birthday (United States Army)
- 4 August: Coast Guard Day (United States Coast Guard)
- 17 September: Constitution Day (general commemoration in the Armed Forces)
- 18 September: Air Force Day (United States Air Force)
- 13 October: U.S. Navy Birthday (United States Navy)
- 27 October: Navy Day (United States Navy)
- 10 November: Marine Corps Birthday (United States Marine Corps)
- 11 November: Veterans Day
- 13 December: National Guard Day (National Guard of the United States)
- 20 December: Space Force Birthday (United States Space Force)

=== Venezuela ===
Venezuela celebrates Army Day on 24 June, the anniversary of Simón Bolívar's victory in the Battle of Carabobo, which led to Venezuela's independence from Spain.

Navy Day, honoring the 1823 Battle of Lake Maracaibo, is celebrated on the same day as the birthday of Simón Bolívar, 24 July.

The Venezuelan Air Force marks Air Force Day on 27 November every year, honoring the role of Venezuelan military aviation in national history (the date, used since 2010, is in remembrance of the 2nd of the 1992 Venezuelan coup d'état attempts in which the Air Force took part). From 1946 until 2009, 10 December was celebrated as Air Force Day in honor of the birth of national military aviation with the 1920 opening of the Air Force Academy in Maracay.

National Guard Day is celebrated on 3 August, the date of the 1936 founding of the Venezuelan National Guard. The entire Venezuelan National Armed Forces are also honored on Independence Day, 5 July, which is also earmarked as National Armed Forces Day.

== Asia ==
=== Azerbaijan ===
The Day of the Armed Forces of Azerbaijan (Azerbaijani: Silahlı Qüvvələr Günü) is celebrated on 26 June. The events are centered around a military parade in Baku, the national capital. The annual parade is one of the biggest in the Commonwealth of Independent States.

=== Armenia ===
Army Day (Armenian: Բանակի օր) is celebrated on 28 January to commemorate the formation of the armed forces of the newly independent Armenia in 1992.

=== Bangladesh ===
Bangladesh observes Armed Forces Day on 21 November to mark the occasion of the Tri-Services joint operation against occupying Pakistani forces in the Liberation War, 1971. The day starts with laying of a floral wreath at 'Sikha Anirban' (Eternal Flame) at Dhaka Cantonment by the President, the Prime Minister and the service chiefs. In the afternoon a reception is held at Senakunja, Dhaka Cantonment where the Prime Minister, ministers, the leader of the opposition and other high civil and military officials attend. In other cantonments, naval bases, and air bases, similar receptions are held. A special TV programme Anirban is broadcast on different TV channels the previous evening, and special newspaper supplements are published with national dailies. Receptions are also held by the Prime Minister and the service chiefs for recipients of the gallantry award Freedom Fighter Award. Special meals for family members are served in all military stations. The Armed Forces Division also brings out a special publication with articles related to the War of Independence and the armed forces.

=== Brunei ===
Armed Forces Day (Hari Ulang Tahun Angkatan Bersenjata Diraja) is marked on 31 May annually to mark the formal raising on this date in 1961 of the Royal Brunei Armed Forces.

=== China ===
The People's Liberation Army Day (Chinese: 中国人民解放军建军纪念日) is celebrated in the People's Republic of China on 1 August in commemoration of the founding of the People's Liberation Army during the Nanchang Uprising of 1927. On 30 June 1933, the Central Committee for Military Revolutionary Cases of the Chinese Communist Party (CCP) voted to declare 1 August an annual holiday. This was solidified on 11 July of that same year, when this decision was approved by the government of the Chinese Soviet Republic. Since then, the date has been celebrated as the professional holiday and birthday of the PLA.

=== Georgia ===
Georgia marks its Armed Forces Day (Georgian: შეიარაღებული ძალების დღე) on 30 April to commemorate the foundation of the Defense Forces of Georgia in 1991.

=== India ===
In India, Army Day is celebrated on 15 January, Navy Day is celebrated on 4 December and Air Force Day is celebrated on 8 October every year and 7 December is celebrated as Armed Forces Flag Day. This Armed Forces Flag Day is a day dedicated to the collection of funds from people of India for the welfare of the Indian Armed Forces personnel.

=== Indonesia ===
Hari Tentara Nasional Indonesia (English: Indonesian National Armed Forces Day) abbreviated HUT TNI; is celebrated on 5 October, the day of the foundation of the Tentara Keamanan Rakyat (People's Security Armed Forces), the predecessor of the TNI, in 1945, itself a replacement for the Badan Keamanan Rakyat (People's Security Corps) established on 29 August on the same year. Military parades are held nationwide in major cities and provincial capitals in honor of the TNI's serving men and women and military veterans.

=== Iran ===
Rouz-e Artesh (English: Army Day) is celebrated on 18 April. Exhibitions of the Iranian Army, such as a military parade of active personnel and veterans in the presence of the President of Iran in front of the Mausoleum of Ruhollah Khomeini, takes place during the holiday events. The Islamic Republic of Iran celebrates this day since 1979. It has been established by the former Supreme Leader of Iran, Ruhollah Khomeini, two months after the fall of the Shah Mohammad Reza Pahlavi.

=== Iraq ===
Iraqi Army Day is celebrated on 6 January, and marks the anniversary of the activation of the Iraqi Army on 6 January 1921. Soldiers typically hold military parades in the Green Zone of Baghdad to mark the holiday, although it is not celebrated in the Kurdistan Region, due to many Kurds accusing the Iraqi Army of genocide. The 2021 Army Day celebrations honored the Army's 100th anniversary.

=== Israel ===
Yom HaZikaron (English: Memorial Day) is observed on the 4th of Iyar of the Hebrew calendar (occur in April or May in the Gregorian Calendar), always preceding the next day's celebrations of Israel Independence Day, Yom Ha-Atzma'ut, on the 5th day of Iyar, the anniversary of the Proclamation of the State of Israel in 1948.

=== Japan ===
In Japan, following the end of World War II, the Self-Defense Forces Day (Japanese: 自衛隊記念日; Romaji: Jiei-tai Kinen'bi) is held every year since 1966. It celebrates the foundation of the Japan Self-Defense Forces. The GSDF, MSDF and ASDF hold annual reviews in rotation (the GSDF a full military parade, the ASDF an airshow and the MSDF a fleet review) set in a designated day in October. There is also a three-day music event called the SDF Marching Festival. The date varies per year.

==== Empire of Japan ====
In the Empire of Japan, Army Commemoration Day (Japanese: 陸軍記念日; Romaji: Riku-gun Kinen'bi) was celebrated every 10 March, in commemoration of the Japanese victory in the Battle of Mukden. Similarly, Navy Commemoration Day (Japanese: 海軍記念日; Romaji: Kai-gun Kinen'bi) was celebrated every 24 May in commemoration of the Japanese victory in the Battle of Tsushima. These days were celebrated from 1906 until the end of World War II in 1945.

=== Kazakhstan ===
The Defender of the Fatherland Day of Kazakhstan is observed on 7 May to mark the founding of the Armed Forces of Kazakhstan on 7 May 1992 after the fall of the USSR.

=== Laos ===
The Anniversary of The Lao Army was observed annually every 20 January by the Lao People's Armed Forces to celebrate the creation of the independent Lao army on 20 January 1949. Every year, large posters are placed to remind that date which was marks the first step towards full independence and domination of the Lao People's Revolutionary Party. A military parade is held in the early morning in the capital of Vientiane. In the Kingdom of Laos, 1 July was the anniversary of the Royal Lao Army.

=== Lebanon ===
Lebanese Armed Forces Day is celebrated on 1 August.

=== Malaysia ===
Hari Angkatan Tentera Malaysia (English: Malaysian Armed Forces Day) is celebrated on 16 September, Malaysia Day. This double holiday, which marks the formation of Malaysia in 1963, is also marked in the Malaysian Armed Forces as the anniversary of the formal raising of the first companies of the Royal Malay Regiment in 1933, from which would grow the basis of the modern day Armed Forces. To avoid conflict with Malaysia Day festivities, celebrations are marked on the Tuesday or weekend after Malaysia Day, which also conclude a two-month long celebration period of the anniversary of Malaysian nationhood.

=== Maldives ===
Maldives Armed Forces Day (Dhivehi: ސިފައިންގެ ދުވަސް) is celebrated by the Maldives National Defence Force every year on 21 April to commemorate the establishment of a Security Force under the Sultan of the Maldives on 21 April 1892.

=== Mongolia ===
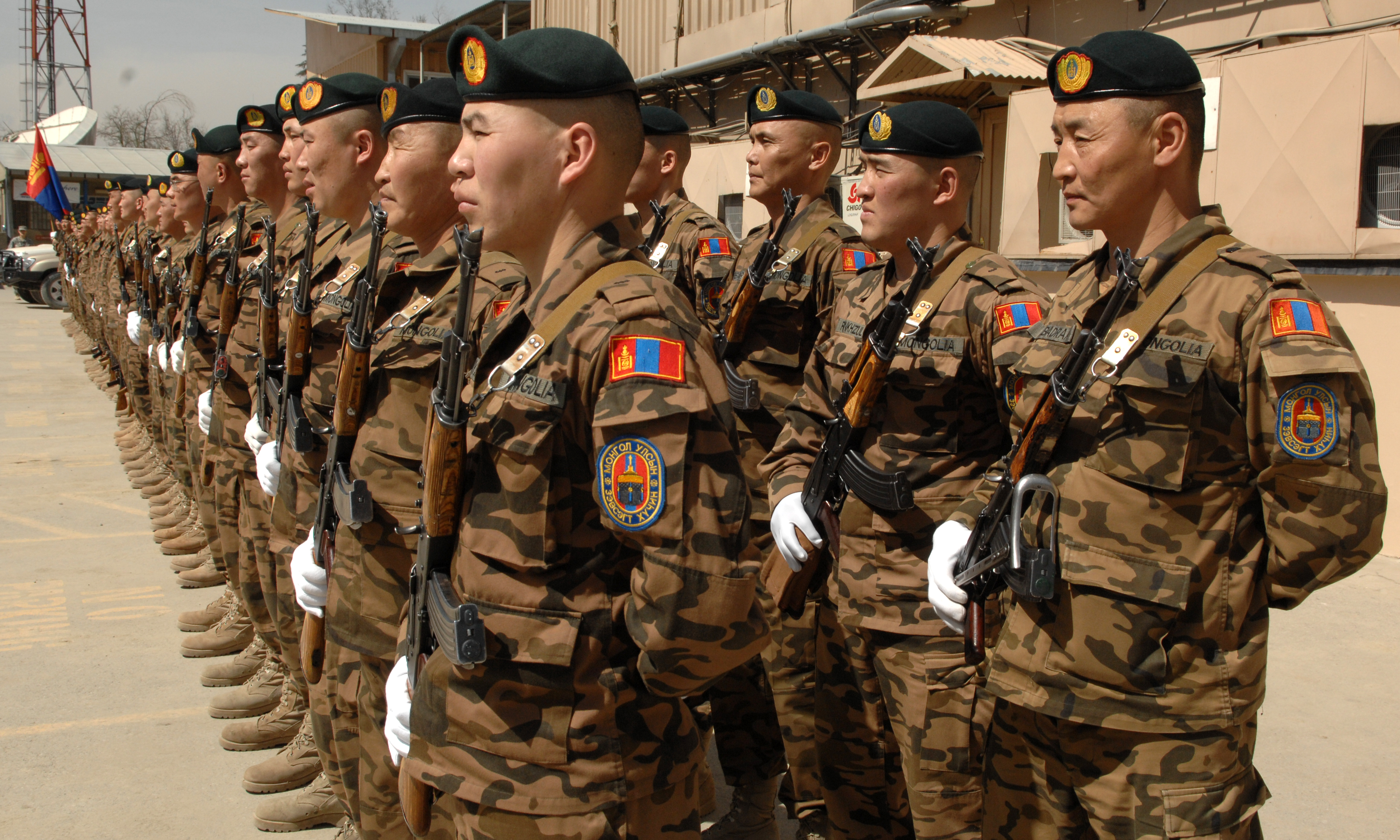
Members of the Mongolian Expeditionary Task Force stand in formation during the Soldiers Day celebrations in Camp Eggers, Afghanistan.

Soldier's Day (Mongolian: Цэргийн баяр) is celebrated on 18 March annually. On 18 March 1921, Sükhbaatar's troops succeeded in taking the town, despite being heavily outnumbered. This day is now the official holiday of Mongolia's army, and is usually celebrated as the equivalent of Defender of the Fatherland Day in Russia, or the male version of International Women's Day.

=== Myanmar ===
In Myanmar, Armed Forces Day (တပ်မတော်နေ့) is celebrated on 27 March in commemoration of the start of Burmese army's resistance to Japanese occupation in 1945. Originally, it was known as Resistance Day (တော်လှန်ရေးနေ့).

=== North Korea ===
In North Korea, the Military Foundation Day is celebrated on 8 February, in commemoration of the day of the creation of the modern Korean People's Army (KPA) in 1948. On that holiday North Korea holds a national commemorative assembly in Pyongyang and various commemorative events, firepower demonstrations, concerts and the biannual military parade. Since 23 April 1996 when the Central People's Committee issued an ordinance making it a national holiday, both the entire military and civilians are permitted to take off from work to celebrate all those serving in the KPA and its veterans.

Additionally, since 2015, the KPA and its veterans are honored on People's Revolutionary Army Day, held every 25 April, to commemorate the official formation of the predecessor forces of the Army, the Revolutionary Army, in the spring of 1932.

=== Pakistan ===
In Pakistan, the Federal Army, Navy and Air Force celebrate Defence Day (6 September), the Navy Day/Victory Day (8 September) and the Air Force Day (7 September) respectively. Usually the ceremony takes place on the Resolution or Pakistan Day (23 March) when all three services display their full colours and guards of honour, as well as on Independence Day (14 August).

=== Philippines ===
Armed Forces Day (Filipino: Araw ng Hukbong Sandatahang Lakas, Spanish: Dia de las Fuerzas Armadas de Filipinas) is observed on 21 December, the anniversary of the official founding of the Armed Forces of the Philippines in 1935 in accordance with CA No. 1 (National Defense Act of 1935).

=== Taiwan / Republic of China (ROC) ===
The Armed Forces Day (Chinese: 軍人節) is celebrated in the Republic of China on the island of Taiwan on 3 September, on the same day as their Victory over Japan Day (1945). Pursuant to Article 5 of the Order to Implement Commemoration Days and Holidays (紀念日及節日實施辦法), the Ministry of National Defense (國防部) determines how to allow a day off for the military personnel.

Since 2016, following the Tsai Ing-wen government's removal of seven public holidays, this is no longer a public holiday in the Republic of China. However, relevant institutions, groups, and schools may still hold celebrating activities.

=== Tajikistan ===
Рӯзи Артиши Миллӣ Тоҷик (English: Tajik National Army Day) is celebrated on 23 February to commemorate the formation of the Armed Forces of Tajikistan in 1993. The main celebrations are held in Dushanbe, with the President of Tajikistan, in his/her capacity as Supreme Commander in Chief, takes the salute at a wreath laying ceremony in Victory Park. Military parades have been held on Armed Forces Day on jubilee years (2003 and 2013 for example).

The following service branches also have their own professional holidays:

- 6 February – Tajik Internal Troops
- 28 May – Tajik Border Troops
- 4 August – Tajik Mobile Forces
- 2 October – Presidential National Guard

=== Thailand ===
Thailand honours the Royal Thai Armed Forces on 18 January, Royal Thai Armed Forces Day. The RTAF honors on that day the anniversary of the victory won by the King Naresuan in the legendary elephant duel against Mingyi Swa (grandson of Bayinnaung) in 1592 at Nong Sarai, Suphanburi. This is honored with massive military parades in various parts of the country. The main celebrations are in Bangkok and on behalf of the Royal Family of Thailand, the Chief of Defence Forces takes the salute on this day's parade. In 2020, King Vajiralongkorn, as Chief of the Armed Forces, attended the Armed Forces Day parade for the very first time.

=== Singapore ===
In Singapore, Singapore Armed Forces Day falls on 1 July each year. The practice began in 1969, just several years after Singapore separated from Malaysia to become a sovereign nation. The day is marked by a parade and a re-affirmation of the pledge of loyalty by all members of the Singapore Armed Forces on parade in a Trooping the Colour like event. Each year, a minute of silence is observed to pay tribute to the servicemen. On that day, the outgoing colour bearer of the Singapore Army hands over the State Colour of the Army to a new colour bearer from the Army's Best Combat Unit of the year. The President of Singapore gives a holiday address to the SAF and the nation. Since 1987, rededication ceremonies have been held across the country so that employers can pledge their support for SAF.

=== South Korea ===
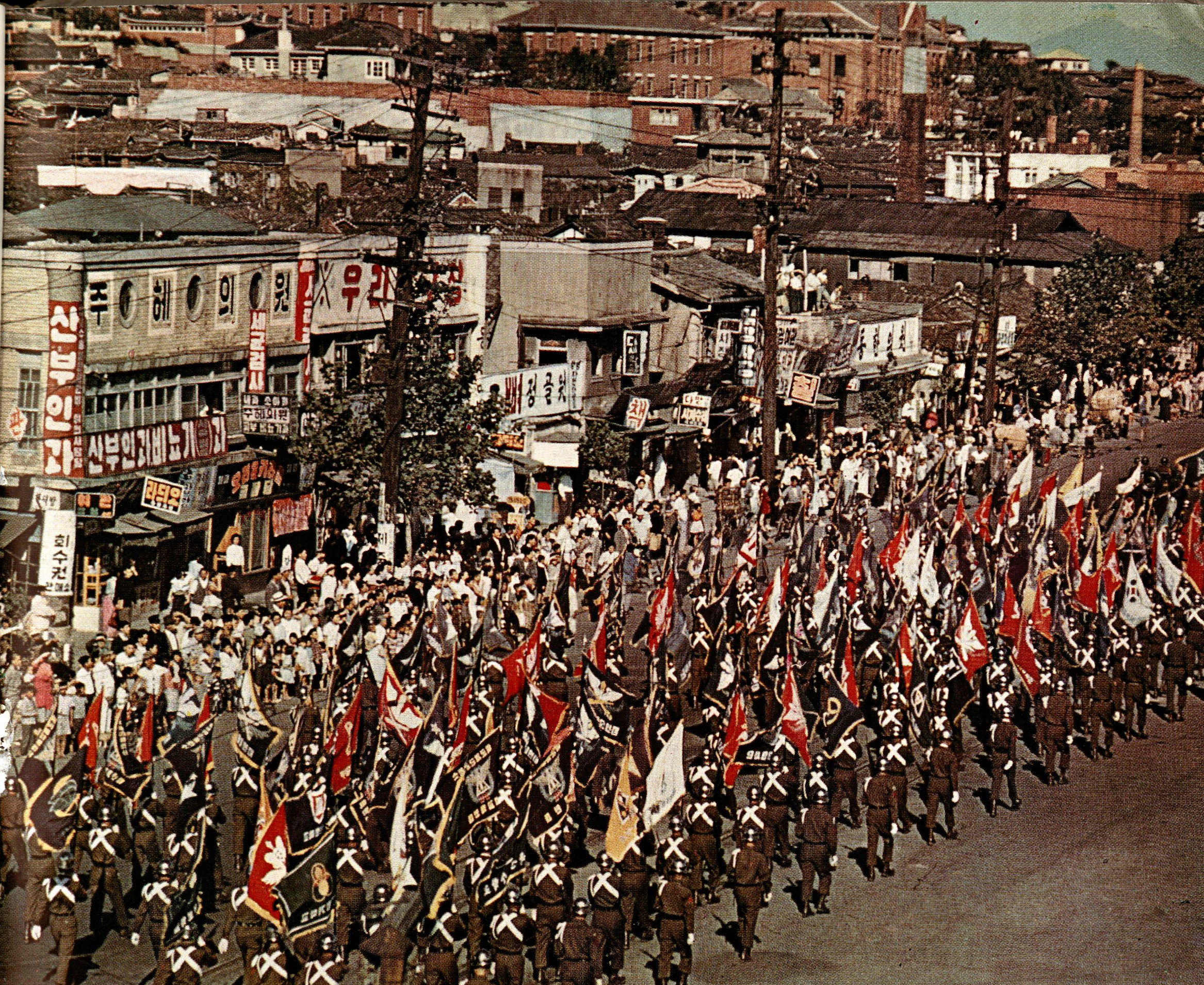
Troops parading in Seoul on "Armed Forces Day" 1962-10-01.

In South Korea, 국군의 날 (English: Armed Forces Day) falls on 1 October, the day that South Korean forces broke through the 38th parallel in 1950 during the Korean War. It is not a national holiday or public day off, but a National Flag Raising Day (국기게양일) to recognize and honor the active and reserve servicemen and women and veterans of the Republic of Korea Armed Forces.

=== Sri Lanka ===
In Sri Lanka each armed services celebrates its own Army Day (10 October), the Navy Day (9 December) and the Air Force Day (2 March) respectively. However all armed services celebrate Independence Day (4 February) with a military parade in which they display their full colours. Since 2010, the armed services also hold parades on Victory and Remembrance Day (18 May), in honour of the armed forces fallen, heroes and veterans of the Sri Lankan Civil War.

=== Vietnam ===
In Vietnam, People's Army Day is celebrated on 22 December, the day of the 1944 foundation of the People's Army of Vietnam. This is not a public holiday, but relevant celebrations are held nationwide to celebrate the occasion.

== Europe ==
=== Bulgaria ===
The Day of Bravery and Bulgarian Armed Forces Day is commemorated every year on 6 May, The Feast of Saint George, who is the patron saint of the Bulgarian Armed Forces. The national parade is held on Prince Alexander of Battenberg Square in Sofia, the national capital city, on this day, with the salute taken by the President of Bulgaria, the Supreme Commander of the Armed Forces.

=== Croatia ===
In Croatia, the commemorative dates of the Armed Forces are as follows:

Armed Forces of Croatia (Croatian: Oružane snage Republike Hrvatske):

- 28 May – Croatian Armed Forces Day (Croatian: Dan Oružanih snaga Republike Hrvatske), marking the day of the first-ever public parade of the military forces on 28 May 1991 on Stadion Kranjčevićeva, Zagreb.

Croatian Army (Croatian: Hrvatska kopnena vojska);

- 28 May – Croatian Army Day (Croatian: Dan Hrvatske kopnene vojske).

Croatian Navy (Croatian: Hrvatska ratna mornarica);

- 18 September – Croatian Navy Day (Croatian: Dan Hrvatske ratne mornarice);

Croatian Air Force and Defense (Croatian: Hrvatsko ratno zrakoplovstvo i protuzračna obrana).

- 12 December – Croatian Air Force Day (Croatian: Dan Hrvatskog ratnog zrakoplovstva).

The entire Croatian Armed Forces are also honored on 5 August, Victory and Homeland Defenders Day and Day of the Defenders of Croatia, celebrating the anniversary of the 1995 Operation Storm.

=== Finland ===
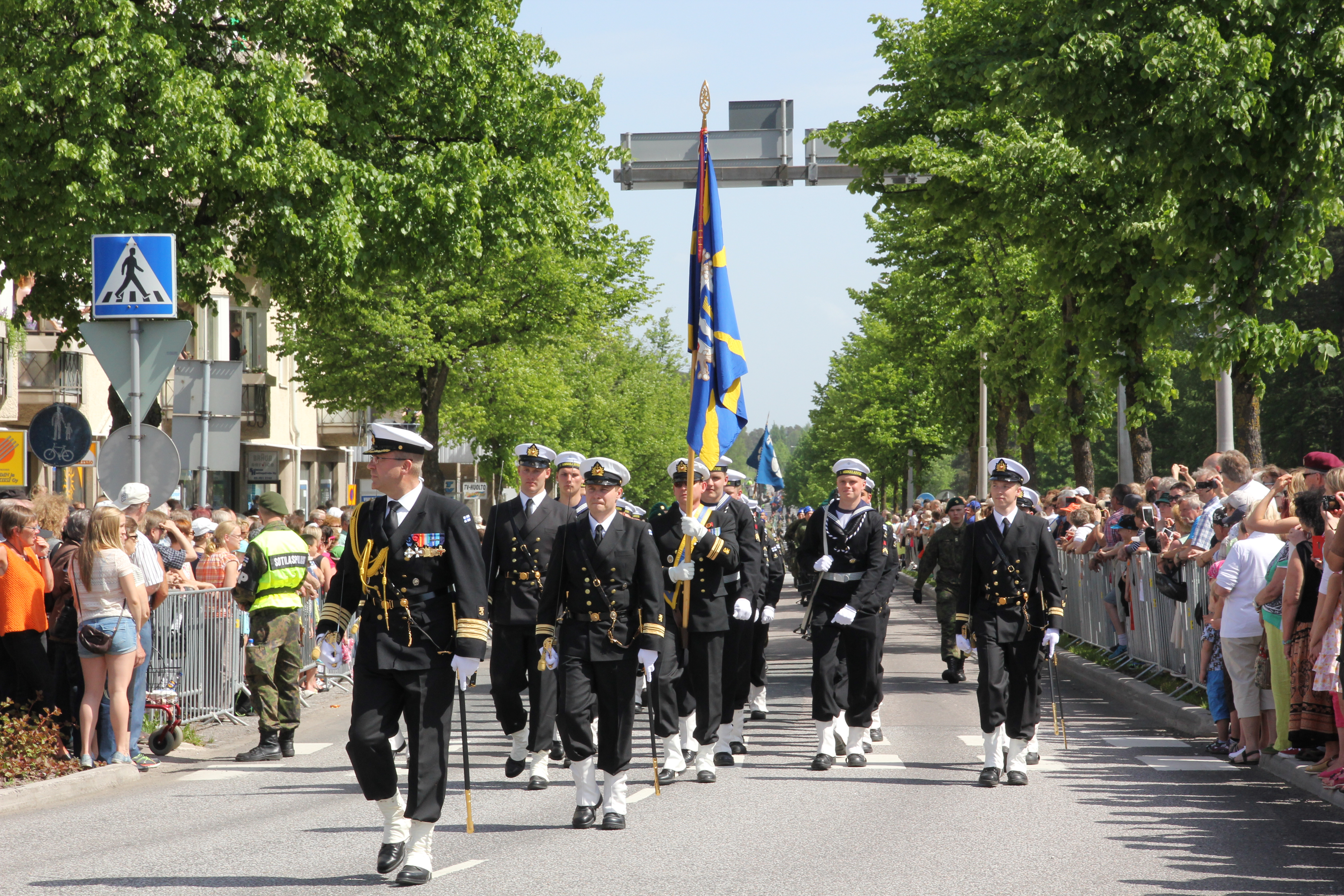
The Nyland Brigade (Finnish: Uudenmaan prikaatti) at the 2014 Festival Parade of the Finnish Defense Forces on the Valtakatu street in Lappeenranta, Finland

In Finland, Day of the Finnish Defence Forces (Finnish: Puolustusvoimain lippujuhlan päivä, lit. 'The Day of the Defence Forces' flag fest') is celebrated on 4 June, which is the birthday of C. G. E. Mannerheim, the Marshal of Finland. During 1919–1939 it was called the Day of the War People's flag fest (Finnish: Sotaväen lippujuhlan päivä) and was celebrated on 16th as the Victory Day of the Troops of the Republic of Finland, i. e. the Whites over the Reds in the Civil War 1918. After the Winter War there were no need to maintain the dichotomy of Finnish society and the celebrations of 16 May were ended. During Mannerheim's 75th birthday the Finnish Government declared that from then on 4 June would officially celebrated as the Birthday of Marshal of Finland (Finnish: Suomen marsalkan syntymäpäivä). Even though the official name of the day changed soon after it is still known, also in official context, as "The Birthday of Marshal of Finland".

=== France ===
During France's national day, France honors its armed forces during the military parade of 14 July, which is the oldest and largest military parade in Europe.

=== Greece ===
Greece marks its Armed Forces Day (Greek: Ημέρα των Ενόπλων Δυνάμεων) on 21 November, on the day of the Presentation of Mary.

=== Hungary ===
In Hungary, the Patriots and Homeland Defenders Day is celebrated on 21 May, honoring all those serving in the Hungarian Defence Force.

=== Italy ===
Giorno delle Forze Armate (English: Armed Forces Day) is celebrated on 4 November to remember the Italian victory in the First World War. On 4 November 1918, Austrian-Hungarian forces agreed to a cease fire, thus ending the war on Italian front.

The following service holidays are celebrated all over the Italian Armed Forces:

- Army Day: 4 May (Italian Army)
- Navy Day: 10 June (Italian Navy)
- Air Force Day: 28 March (Italian Air Force)
- Carabinieri Days: 5 June and 13 July

=== Latvia ===
The Latvian National Armed Forces Day is marked every 10 July, the day when in 1919 Latvia's Independent and North Latvian brigades where united in one formation under the command of General Dāvids Sīmansons. Similar celebrations occur on Lāčplēsis Day.

=== Lithuania ===
Lithuanian Armed Forces Day (Lithuanian: Lietuvos kariuomenės diena) is celebrated on 23 November. It honors the issuing of the first laws regarding the army on 23 November 1918 at the height of the Lithuanian–Soviet War. The holiday is traditionally celebrated with the noon military parade on Cathedral Square in Vilnius, which runs through Gediminas Avenue to Independence Square after being reviewed by the President of Lithuania. NATO, alongside Lithuanian troops take part in the parade, with contingents coming from United States, Latvia, Canada, Ukraine, Germany and the United Kingdom.

=== Moldova ===
On 3 September, the Moldovan National Army marks the Ziua Armatei Naționale (Day of the National Army), with the Ministry of Defense organizing large demonstrations on the occasion of holiday. Military and civilian staff lay flowers at the Stephen the Great Monument and there is also a ceremony of the decoration of National Army distinctions. On 2 March, the entire Armed Forces of Moldova celebrates Remembrance Day, which honours the veterans of the Transnistria War, with events being organized from 1–4 March. Participants in years past have also organized the Memory March, walking from Great National Assembly Square to the Maica Indurerata (Grieving Mother) at the Eternity Memorial Complex.

=== Montenegro ===
The Day of the Armed Forces of Montenegro is celebrated on 7 October. This day celebrates the victory over the vastly superior Byzantine army at the hands of Stefan Vojislav, the lord of Duklja in a battle at Tuđemili near Bar in 1042. During this battle, the 40,000 strong Byzantine army was destroyed by the Dukljan Army, killing 7 Byzantine Strategoi. This battle reaffirmed Dukljan independence and freedom from Byzantine imperial rule over the lands of Montenegro.

=== North Macedonia ===
The Day of Macedonian Army is celebrated on 18 August. This date is chosen because on 18 August 1943, the battalion Mirče Acev was formed at the Slavej Mountain. It was the first organized battalion to fight against the Axis forces in World War II in North Macedonia. The day is not a national holiday, but is celebrated with a manifestation at one of the Army's barracks, where the President, the Speaker of the Assembly, the Prime Minister and the Minister of Defense are always present. Usually there is a parade of the armed forces and an exhibition of the weapons and vehicles of the Army.

=== Poland ===
In Poland, the Święto Wojska Polskiego (English: Polish Armed Forces Day) is celebrated annually on 15 August. Begun in 1923, the day commemorated the anniversary of Poland's 1920 victory over Soviet Russia at the Battle of Warsaw in the Polish-Soviet War. The holiday was discontinued during the communist era in 1947 and replaced with 12 October, the anniversary of the 1943 Battle of Lenino, but it was revived again after the overthrow of communism in 1992.

=== Romania ===
In Romania, the Armed Forces Day (Romanian: Ziua Armatei) is celebrated on 25 October. On this day, in 1944, the Romanian Land Forces retook Carei, the last Romanian city under joint German–Hungarian occupation.

The Romania–Hungary border had been reached a few days earlier, but the troops rested, and then completed the liberation of Northern Transylvania during the Battle of Carei, in order to coincide with King Michael's birthday on 25 October.

=== Russian Federation ===
In Russia, the День защитника Отечества / Dyen' zaschitnika Otechestva (English: Defender of the Fatherland Day) is celebrated on 23 February, honoring all those serving in the Russian Armed Forces. In the Soviet Union there was День Советской Армии / Dyen' Sovetskoy Armii (Day of the Soviet Army), celebrated on the same date. It is the very day of the anniversary since the formation of the modern armed forces of the Soviet Union in 1918, the traditions of which are continued by the current Russian Armed Forces, in conjunction with the heritage of its Imperial past.

In Russia the following holidays are celebrated by military personnel, veterans and the general public:

- Russian Special Operations Forces Day on 27 February, commemorating the annexation of the Crimean Peninsula in Ukraine, 2014
- Victory Day on 9 May: Victory Day marks Germany's surrender to the Soviet Union in 1945
- Navy Day on the last Sunday of July
- Paratroopers' Day on 2 August
- Russian Air Force Day on 12 August
- Russian Ground Forces Day on 1 October, in honor of the 1550 raising of the first Streltsy detachments
- Russian Aerospace Defence Forces Day on 4 October, the date of the 1957 launching of Sputnik
- Russian Naval Infantry Day on 27 November, the date of its 1705 founding
- Strategic Missile Forces Day on 17 December

=== Serbia ===
Dan Vojske Srbije (Serbian Armed Forces Day) is marked on 23 April, the anniversary of the beginning of the 1815 Second Serbian Uprising which began the long road towards the restoration of Serbian independence after years of Ottoman occupation.

=== Spain ===
Armed Forces Day (Spanish: Día de las Fuerzas Armadas) is observed in Spain since 1978. It started as a purely military celebration, but became with time a more colourful and popular event, the central acts of which are held each year at a different city. Since 1987 it is observed the Saturday nearest to 30 May, feast-day of Saint Ferdinand, King.

The Armed Forces and those killed in service are also honoured at the celebrations of Spain's National Day (12 October).

=== Ukraine ===
- Ground Forces Day for the Ukrainian Ground Forces is celebrated on 12 December.
- The Ukrainian Marine Corps Birthday is celebrated on 23 May since 2018, and alongside being the anniversary of its creation in 1918, also marks the elevation of the Corps as a separate service of the Armed Forces of Ukraine in 2023.
- Navy Day for the Ukrainian Navy is celebrated on the first Sunday of July since June 2015.
- Air Force Day is the first Saturday in August.

For the entire Armed Forces of Ukraine, Armed Forces Day (Ukrainian: День Збройних сил України) is celebrated on 6 December, with fireworks displays and gun salutes nationwide. This holiday was established in 1993 by a resolution passed by the Verkhovna Rada.

Other military holidays in Ukraine include:

- 8 July – Air Defence Forces Day
- 8 August – Signal Corps Day
- 7 September – Military Intelligence Forces Day
- 14 September – Armoured Forces Day
- 14 September – Mobilized Servicemen Day
- 1 October – Defenders of Ukraine Day
- 29 October – Finance Officers Day
- 3 November – Corps of Engineers Day
- 21 November – Air Assault Forces Day
- 4 December – Rocket Forces and Artillery Day
- 23 December – Operational Servicemen Day

=== United Kingdom ===
The first Armed Forces Day in the United Kingdom took place on 27 June 2009. It replaced the previous Veterans' Day, first observed in 2006. The date was chosen as it marked the day after the anniversary of the first investiture ceremony for the Victoria Cross military medal for heroism, held on 26 June 1857.

The 2009 celebrations were centred on Chatham Historic Dockyard – a former Royal Navy base. The Prime Minister Gordon Brown and his wife Sarah, and Prince Richard, the Duke and his Duchess of Gloucester, attended as the official party, along with the head of the unified Armed Forces, Air Chief Marshal Sir Jock Stirrup, and Defence Minister Kevan Jones.

The Isle of Man, a Crown Dependency, held its events a month later on 26 July 2009.

The 2010 event was centred on Cardiff and in 2011 it was Edinburgh's turn. Smaller events were held throughout the United Kingdom.

UK Armed Forces Day 2012 was centred on Plymouth and took place on Saturday 30 June. Smaller events were held throughout the United Kingdom. The Isle of Man holds its event on Sunday 24 June.

Scarborough was chosen to be the host location for the 2020 UK Armed Forces Day event on Saturday 27 June. Scarborough was announced as the venue in June 2018, after submitting a bid which was described by the MoD as "outstanding".

The event was due to take place on 27 June 2020, and would have contained a large programme of events taking place on the day and in the build up to the event. The AFD became a "virtual event" after the COVID-19 pandemic and so Scarborough Borough Council created a website hosting military related content instead. The AFD for 2021, will be held in Scarborough in lieu of the 2020 event.

== Oceania ==
=== Australia and New Zealand ===
ANZAC Day is a public holiday commemorated on 25 April. It is a national day of remembrance in Australia and New Zealand that broadly commemorates all Australians and New Zealanders "who served and died in all wars, conflicts, and peacekeeping operations" and "the contribution and suffering of all those who have served." The date commemorates the landings in 1915 at Anzac Cove on the coast of the Dardanelles and the Aegean Sea of the old Ottoman Empire (modern Turkey) by Australian and New Zealand combined military forces in the Australian and New Zealand Army Corps, the beginning of the costly casualties of the Gallipoli campaign in World War I.

There is also a Reserve Forces Day in Australia first celebrated in 1998 for "the 50th anniversary of the reforming of the Citizen Military Forces after World War II on 1 July 1948 and Reserve service. The date of the first of July was chosen as the official date of Reserve Forces Day with the celebrations being held on that day or the weekend before or following that date."

== See also ==
- Red poppy
- Remembrance Sunday
- Volkstrauertag
