= Moorish movement =

Moroccan nationalist movement

The Moorish movement (Arabic: الحركة المورية) is a nationalist movement in Morocco that primarily operates on social media, aiming to "revive the glorious past of Morocco." It opposes the "enemies of the nation" and promotes the supremacy of the "Moorish ethnicity." Its ideology is also known as Tamaghrabit.

The movement was launched around 2017 and has gained influence through campaigns on historical and cultural topics on social media, while also maintaining its own media outlets. Its objective is to highlight Morocco's uniqueness and its dominance over other Maghreb countries, which it accuses of appropriating its history and heritage, and of attacking the nation's enemies. The movement faces criticism regarding the veracity of its publications and its campaigns of harassment and disinformation.

== History ==
The Moorish movement, according to the Spanish news agency EFE, has no connection to the Moorish sovereign citizens in the United States, who claim that their ancestors were originally from Morocco during the time of slavery.

Emerging in 2017, the Moorish Movement established itself through social media, initially focusing on Moroccan folklore. Gradually, it evolved into a nationalist movement, gaining a base of supporters and displaying a marked fascination for figures like Putin and Erdoğan, while expressing hostility towards "Islamists", "leftists", and Algeria. The movement sometimes glorifies violence against Algeria and the Polisario. Their posts occasionally feature memes of Hassan II or Pepe the Frog.

In March 2022, the Moroccan Arabic newspaper al-Sabah reported that this emerging trend on social media glorifies the "supremacy of the Moorish ethnicity" and advocates for the expulsion of migrants from "countries south of the Sahara," primarily through Facebook pages. The newspaper noted that these racial ideas resonate with some segments of the Moroccan population, indicating a real rise in an "extremist movement."

The originator of this movement is not precisely known. A European researcher suggested that "someone is directing this movement from above," noting that several Twitter accounts are linked to individuals close to certain diplomats. According to EFE, the movement also receives state support, as the government views it as an entity that can fill the cultural and political void in the face of rising Islamist currents. Some Moroccan journalists believe that intelligence services might be behind these networks, although they cannot provide concrete evidence.

== Objectives and Ideology ==
The symbol generally used by the movement is presumed to be the Marinid flag; however, it is actually a reproduction of one of the flags captured by the French in 1908 in Morocco, with no evidence that it is Marinid.

The stated goal of the Moorish movement is to "revive the glorious and ancestral past of imperial Morocco and defend the uniqueness of the kingdom against threats from all sides," attacking anyone they consider "enemies of the nation." The movement relies on unfounded ideological narratives with exclusive aims and lacks solid scientific arguments to justify its claims of uniqueness. It encourages its supporters to adopt a new national interpretation of history, fostering national pride grounded in the ideological concept of "Tamaghrabit" (Moroccanism).

According to Moroccan sociological analyst Bouchaib Majdou, "the popularity of these groups is fueled by the latent and manifest conflict with our Algerian neighbors." An interlocutor from the movement, interviewed by the Moroccan media outlet Media24, describes it as a virtual nationalist current that encompasses various trends and aims to promote the uniqueness of Morocco. This perspective addresses issues of history, identity, and the specificity of Moroccan culture, highlighting significant misinformation on these topics, as well as widespread ignorance and indifference.

According to the Spanish news agency EFE, the movement is not politically aligned with Islamist currents but gathers a significant portion of the Moroccan liberal elite, who believe in Morocco's distinctiveness from other nations, rooted in the kingdom of Mauretania.

Rachid Achachi notes that the Moorish are divided into two trends. On one side is Pulse – Morocco's counterculture, a movement that emerged in 2016, inspired by English liberalism. On the other side is a social media-based movement that does not address economic issues, unlike the former, which critiques those advocating for protectionism. Both share an ideology of cultural hegemony over the Maghreb.

The movement also comprises a community residing in France and Belgium, claiming a 100% Moroccan nationalism and patriotism, even though most of its members do not live in Morocco and, in many cases, have never lived there. Activists of this movement typically use a flag they consider to be that of the Marinids.

== Publications ==
A sociologist who specializes in social media and follows the Moorish movement spoke anonymously to the Moroccan media outlet Media24 to avoid attacks from the movement. He highlighted one of their methods: the movement presents thinkers like Abdellah Laroui as part of their ideology while manipulating excerpts from their works to fit their vision of the Kingdom. According to this sociologist, these excerpts are completely taken out of context, distorted, and shared virally due to technology. The thinker himself, if he were still alive, would never endorse such manipulation.

The movement promotes a narrative of an imperial Morocco, viewing the Moroccan state as a continuation of the ancient dynasties that ruled the region, despite this information not accurately reflecting historical reality.

Rachid Achachi described the movement as somewhat adolescent and lacking structure, noting that the level of content it produces does not exceed that of Wikipedia.

The movement communicates through social media and websites like MoorishTimes.

== Attacks and Defamations ==
In a report published by Meta in February 2021, it was noted that Meta "removed 385 Facebook accounts, 6 pages, and 40 Instagram accounts due to violations of their policy against coordinated inauthentic behavior. This network was primarily based in Morocco and targeted a national audience."

The report indicated that the operators of this network used "fake accounts" and published "simultaneously" in various groups to create the "impression of greater popularity for their content." Additionally, these accounts were frequently used to comment on news and "pro-government articles" from various media outlets, including Chouf TV.

According to a 2021 report by Freedom House, accounts associated with this movement played a role in disseminating "disinformation and pro-government propaganda." They adopted an online aesthetic similar to that of the "far-right" and shared "ultranationalist, ethnonationalist, misogynistic, and racist" content. The report added that "Moroccan officials were observed regularly interacting with these accounts, liking and sharing their content, while some accounts from the movement actively promoted content from official accounts, including those of diplomats and embassies, while targeting online activists and journalists."

Former international footballer Abdeslam Ouaddou was targeted with attacks and insults following his call for fair play between Algerian and Moroccan supporters during an Arab Cup match. These attacks, often associated with the Moorish movement, included racist distortions of his image. On Twitter, Ouaddou condemned these attacks, sharing examples of the movement's racist content and labeling their ideologies as racist, xenophobic, and homophobic.

Moroccan Minister Othman El Ferdaous faced criticism from the movement after couscous was recognized by UNESCO as an intangible cultural heritage by all Maghreb countries. The movement viewed this as a betrayal by the minister and a defeat for the state, arguing that countries like Algeria, Mauritania, and Tunisia were trying to appropriate a dish typically Moroccan. Through this attack, the movement aimed to create a myth, convincing many, especially the youth, that Maghreb countries intend to appropriate Moroccan heritage.

Marouane Harmach, after publishing a thread criticizing the movement, received intimidation and threats from its supporters. The movement accused him of being an ally of foreign powers destabilizing the nation, especially after the European Union's Twitter account liked his thread. The movement reacted quickly, presenting this as evidence of his affiliation and launching an attack against him. Harmach responded that the movement never addresses substantive issues and always seeks unfounded accusations, further proving that it is a danger to the country.

In 2020, a series of cyberattacks carried out by Moroccan hackers targeted Algerian websites. These cyberattacks were marked by the use of the Moorish movement's symbol on the homepage of the hacked sites.

In 2023, they pressured to cancel Booba's concert in Marrakesh, claiming that Booba had disrespected Moroccan women.

The movement also commented on the case of Brahim Bouhlal, imprisoned in Morocco, and facilitated the intervention of lawyers, hoping that this case would serve as a warning to artists considering similar actions.

== Consequences ==
The accounts linked to this movement, removed by Meta, contributed to the dissemination of attacks against Algeria, independent journalists, feminists, leftist activists, and the Polisario. In response to the movement's attacks, some "Dzoorish" accounts (a pseudonym chosen in reply to "Moorish") were created to relay this disinformation, leading to an escalation of the information war on social media.

For instance, in these disinformation battles, actors used the visual identity of the Algerian presidency to spread false announcements about the death of President Abdelmadjid Tebboune. In return, some posts exploited the visual identity of the Hespress newspaper to falsely claim the death of King Mohammed VI.

According to reports on the crisis between the two countries, this dissemination exacerbated existing tensions between the regimes, spreading among the population and leading to a deterioration of relations despite their differences.

The EFE news agency highlights that this movement has faced criticism in Morocco, where it is accused of attempting to create an entity in an already identity-crisis context.
