= David Wynn Miller =

American conspiracy theorist, creator of a pseudolegal language

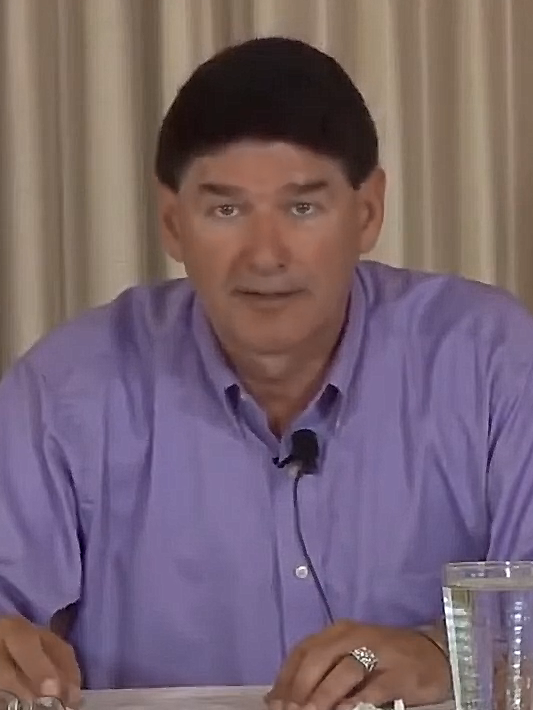
- Born: 1948/1949
- Died: 2018 (aged 68–70)
- Other name: :David-Wynn: Miller
- Occupation: Pseudolegal theorist
- Known for: Creating "Quantum Grammar", a language purported to have legal effect
- Movement: Sovereign citizens

David Wynn Miller (1948/1949–2018), also styled :David-Wynn: Miller, was an American pseudolegal theorist, self-proclaimed judge and leader of a tax protester group within the sovereign citizen movement. Originally a tool and die welder, Miller is best known as the creator of "Quantum Grammar", a version of the English language to be used by people involved in judicial proceedings. He asserted that this constructed language, which is purportedly based on mathematics and includes unorthodox grammar, spelling, punctuation, and syntax, constitutes the only "correct" form of communication in legal processes. People seeking remedy with Miller's syntax in court have been unsuccessful. His language is incomprehensible to most, and the filings that use it are routinely rejected by courts as gibberish. Since Miller's death, "Quantum Grammar" has seen continued usage by other people within the sovereign citizen movement.

== Claimed background ==
Miller lived in Ohio before moving to Milwaukee, Wisconsin. He claimed that at the age of 25, he died for half an hour when an inept surgeon removed both his kidneys and adrenal glands. His heart restarted spontaneously while outside his body during autopsy. Following this, he said his IQ became 200, his endorphin levels were six times normal, and he stopped aging.

Miller's activism stemmed from his own frustrating experience with the legal system. During the 1980s, he went through a divorce proceeding and appeared pro se in numerous child custody hearings (67, according to his website), losing every time. Having become convinced that the judiciary was rigged and governed by linguistic maneuvering and that the English language had been deliberately modified to enslave the people, he decided to override the system by developing his own theory of language to be used as a form of legalese.

== Work and views ==
=== Constructed language and linguistic theories ===
Miller claimed to have created his language in 1988 by discovering "the mathematical interface in the truth that certifies all 5,000 languages, frontwards and backwards." According to Miller, the use of his language guaranteed success in court cases and it could also be used to eliminate taxes and disbar judges. In the following years, he promoted it through various seminars, books and videos.

Miller's constructed language, known in full as "CORRECT-SENTENCE-STRUCTURE-COMMUNICATION-PARSE-SYNTAX-GRAMMAR" (shortened as "C.-S.-S.-C.-P.-S.-G."), has also been variously called, with or without capital letters, "PARSE-SYNTAX-GRAMMAR", "CORRECT-LANGUAGE", "QUANTUM-LANGUAGE-PARSE-SYNTAX-GRAMMAR", "Quantum language", "Truth Language" "Syntax Language", "In the Truth", "Syntax sentencing" or "QUANTUM-MATH-COMMUNICATIONS". The name "Quantum Grammar" eventually stuck and became commonly used in the sovereign citizen movement.

Miller's design involves sentences that begin with prepositional phrases, using the word For. It is easily recognizable, among other traits, by the constant and repetitive use of the phrases "for the" and "with the" and by the absence of action verbs, except in gerund form. Users of the dialect reject the use of adjectives, adverbs and pronouns. The language also has an abundance of punctuation. For example:

FOR THE FORMS OF OUR PUNCTUATIONS ARE WITH THE CLAIM OF THE USE: FULL-COLON=POSITION-LODIO-FACTS, HYPHEN=COMPOUND-FACTS =KNOWN, PERIOD=END-THOUGHT, COMMA-PAUSE, AND LOCATION-TILDES WITH THE MEANINGS AND USES OF THE COMMUNICATIONS WITH THE FULL-COLON OF THE POSITION-LODIAL-FACT-PHRASE WITH THE FACT/KNOWN-TERM OF THE POSITIONAL-LODIO-FACT-PHRASE AND WITH THE VOID OF THE NOM-DE-GUERRE = DEAD-PERSON.

Miller's ideas about language are notably rooted in the idea that only nouns have legal meaning and that their meanings are static and absolute. This had led Miller to arbitrarily recast words' definitions and roles according to his own understanding and convenience. Among the idiosyncratic rules of the language he created, sentences must contain at least 13 words and use more nouns than verbs, sentences used in court filings must start with prepositional phrases, a preposition is needed to certify a noun, and a word that starts with a vowel followed by two consonants means "no contract" and will therefore void any document.

Although the language he pioneered is incomprehensible to most people, Miller asserted that it can end all forms of misunderstanding and conflict and called mainstream English language a "fiction". Miller has also been described as leading a "linguistic cult".

After creating his language, Miller styled his name as "David-Wynn: Miller" or ":David-Wynn: Miller", claiming that the punctuation marks are hieroglyphs that make him "life" and that without them his name is two adjectives and a pronoun. He verbally said his name "David hyphen Wynn full colon Miller".

In a variation of the strawman theory, Miller claimed that the addition of hyphens and colons to a person's name makes the person a "prepositional phrase". The person is thus identified as a "fact" existing in the "now-time-dimension"; the names as written in this way are distinguished from the names listed at birth and in "all-caps" (as on a birth certificate), which identify the legal estate and not the living being in fact. Signing up to get a "birth certificate" allegedly creates a taxable Person (Corporation) (e.g., DAVID WYNN MILLER as opposed to :David-Wynn: Miller.). Therefore, Miller asserted that, by adding punctuation to their names and by using his language in their tax return forms, people could avoid paying taxes. No judge has ever accepted this argument, and in fact many individuals who have attempted to use it have ended up in jail.

Canadian judge John D. Rooke, who compiled various examples of pseudolaw in his 2012 Meads v. Meads decision, commented that Miller's "bizarre form of 'legal grammar'" is "not merely incomprehensible in Canada, but equally so in any other jurisdiction" and that reading documents written in Miller's language may give the impression that their author is "suffering from mental or cognitive disturbance".

Donald J. Netolitzky, writing for the Alberta Law Review, commented that "Documents written in 'Millerese' are a challenge to interpret" and that "video recordings of Miller's seminars defy both description and credulity". David J. Peterson, a language creator, observed that Miller's ideas demonstrate "confusion about the nature of language in general... and of the English language specifically", notably because there is no such thing as "context-independent meaning — in life or in language".

=== Other views ===
Miller has used and may have originated a scheme found in Organised Pseudolegal Commercial Arguments that cites the Universal Postal Union as supranational authority. The argument is that affixing a stamp to a piece of paper changes the authority under which it is governed. He assumed the title "postmaster" and called his followers the adherents of the "Universal Postal System".

Miller claimed that he had a billion followers and that Bill Clinton and the entire Supreme Court of the United States were his students. He also claimed to have "turned Hawaii into a verb", thus becoming "King of Hawaii". Like many sovereign citizens, Miller asserted that the world is secretly governed by maritime law; his own explanation for this situation was that "Earth is a vessel in a sea of space".

Besides his pseudolegal ideas, Miller was a proponent of the 2012 phenomenon and also adhered to a wide variety of conspiracy theories, some related to 9/11. He claimed that Mastercard gained control of the US economy on September 17, 1999 and that the steel beams and all the plastic items in the World Trade Center buildings were plastic explosives which created an electromagnetic pulse as a coverup for a $12 trillion electronic heist committed during 9/11. Through his website, Miller advocated the use of alternative "health products" and promoted theories regarding chemtrails or UFOs, as well as vaccine misinformation.

== Activism ==
Besides promoting his language, Miller was active as the leader of a group of tax protesters. He and his followers espoused the views that income taxes were illegitimate and that the United States' federal courts did not have jurisdiction over them because they were sovereign unto themselves. While their views were not distinguishable from those of other sovereign citizen groups, the use of Miller's language made them stand apart.

The Los Angeles Times called Miller a "far-right activist". The Anti-Defamation League described Miller as "one of the most unusual of the 'common law gurus' who travel the country holding seminars and offering legal advice. Miller has created his own unique version of English grammar, one that even many sovereign citizens find hard to understand or accept."

Despite the unusual nature of his theories, Miller became popular as a "guru" within the sovereign citizen movement, which he helped expand to other English-speaking countries. Besides the United States, Miller was active in Canada, and later in Australia, New Zealand and the United Kingdom, where he would disrupt court proceedings, file unintelligible documents, and host paid seminars to explain his theories and advertise the use of his language. He also called himself a "Plenipotentiary-Judge" of the "Unity States of the World".

Various defendants attempted to use Miller's language or ideas in courts. Not being a licensed lawyer, Miller would file complaints on behalf of his clients with himself as a co-plaintiff, or appear in court as an "agent" or as a McKenzie friend. There is no evidence that the use of his language has ever been helpful in legal proceedings. In 2010, the Southern Poverty Law Center noted that Miller was one of the few sovereign citizen "gurus" who had "clients in four different countries currently serving prison sentences". Courts would typically dismiss Miller's documents as "completely unintelligible" or "incomprehensible" and sometimes declare him a vexatious litigant.

In 2001 he was banned from entry into Canada for two years after a number of judges had jailed people for contempt of court after they had attempted to use his "truth language" to defend against tax evasion charges. In 2011, an Australian barrister, who had been paid by his clients to attend one of Miller's seminars, described Miller's teachings as "the most ridiculous thing I've ever heard in my life."

On December 21, 2012 (the predicted end of the world according to the Mayan prophecy), Miller and some of his associates created a "Federal Postal court" (styled "US :FEDERAL-POSTALCOURT"), with Miller as Judge, and used it to release default "judgements". Miller claimed that his "court" (which is unrelated to the civil court operated by the United States Postal Service) had been originally opened in 1775 by Benjamin Franklin, but closed a year later with the onset of the Revolutionary War. Miller therefore purported that he had reopened Franklin's court. This "court" had no courthouse or fixed location, but Miller claimed that it had transitory jurisdiction with a presence wherever the federal postal eagle symbol may be.

In 2016, Miller's "Federal Postal court" issued a $11.5 million dollar judgement against the mortgage service company Ocwen by declaring that its loans were fraudulent. A federal judge investigated Miller's court and struck down the filing, concluding that the "Federal Postal court" was "a sham and no more than a product of fertile imagination" and that any "judgement" it rendered should not be registered and should be stricken. Miller's court issued a similar $11.7 million judgement against Bank of America, on behalf of a pair of borrowers who were seeking relief on a $298,000 loan. The United States District Court for the District of Arizona struck down the filing and, in May 2018, issued a default judgement against the Federal Postal court, and against Miller and his associates personally.

Lawyer Colin McRoberts finds Miller's linguistic experiment remarkable by the fact that he could find followers despite the strangeness of his theories and their consistent failure in court, and considers him a good example of a pseudolaw litigant and guru whose ideas "flout consensus reality": "as baffling, incomprehensible, and plainly false as his theories are, he sold them. His customers paid to take seminars on how to use proper "quantum" phrasing in court. He and his followers relied on his strategies to the detriment of all involved—including Miller himself."

== Selected cases ==
In 1998 Miller assisted Ingleside, Illinois resident George Johnson in his legal defense against child molestation charges. Johnson was convicted and returned to prison in 1999.

In June 1998 Prescott, Arizona resident James McCreary filed a federal lawsuit after being arrested in February for aggravated assault and possession of drug paraphernalia. In his filing, "McCreary mentions the name of his apparent mentor. David Wynn Miller of Ohio is an advocate of the restoration of Constitutional rights through 'correct' language and procedure." McCreary's actions in court got his conviction reduced by the Judge to three misdemeanors, and he was sentenced to three concurrent 60-day sentences in jail.

In August 2001, Paul and Myrna Schuck unsuccessfully used Miller's language during a tax evasion trial in Calgary, Alberta. They wrote their names on postage stamps affixed to laminated identification badges, which they claimed gave them authority equal to the Queen of England's. Online posts during the proceedings show they were using Miller's methods. They served 19 days of a 30-day sentence.

In October 2001, Andrew William Sereda, a naturopath, went to jail in Calgary, Alberta for contempt of court when he addressed a Judge in Miller's language during his tax evasion trial.

In September 2002, Miller was profiled when Milwaukee-based accountant Steven Allen Magritz was jailed after engaging in what authorities called "paper terrorism", or filing large numbers of legal claims against perceived enemies, as part of the sovereign citizen anti-government movement. The article calls Miller "the movement's linguist" and outlines his belief that people don't need to pay taxes if they can "prove that money is a verb". Magritz was convicted in 2003 on seven counts of criminal slander of title and sentenced to five years in prison.

In December 2002, Wisconsin juries convicted Oconomowoc, Wisconsin residents Janice K. Logan and Jason Zellmer (Miller's cousin) of "simulating legal process" by filing documents that purported to be legal documents from the jurisdiction of the "Unity States of the World," a concept originated by Miller. Zellmer had been previously convicted of resisting an officer. Miller testified at the trial and expounded his theories. The defendants were found guilty.

In 2005, Montclair, New Jersey resident Brenda Rickard was arrested and charged with orchestrating a $30 million mortgage scam. A follower of Miller, Rickard asserted during her trial that her name was ":Brenda :Rickard" and that the complaint against her should be written in Miller's "truthful language". Her lawyer requested a psychological evaluation following Rickard's behavior in court. Rickard and co-defendant Jamila Davis were convicted of conspiracy and six counts of bank fraud in 2008.

In 2006, Hemet, California physician Jerome Mueller was jailed for tax evasion: "Part of a loose-knit group calling themselves 'freemen' and 'patriots,' Mueller is an adherent of 'truth language.' Developed by self-professed genius David Wynn Miller, of Milwaukee, truth language is based on mathematics and purports to be the only correct way of interpreting English. (...) The U.S. government, however, contends in everyday English that Mueller owes income taxes back to 1993."

In 2008, Wai'anae, Hawaii resident Rita Makekau was convicted of eight counts of assault and one count of domestic abuse for injuring five children in her care with hammers and knives. In 2009, Makekau challenged her child abuse conviction by claiming her sovereignty group, Hawaiian Kingdom Government, declared her innocent. Miller said he was the group's spokesperson and is a "plenipotentiary judge, ambassador and postmaster". Makekau was ordered to prison in 2009.

In 2012, imprisoned sovereign citizen and tax protester leader David Russell Myrland enlisted Miller's help to file a lawsuit against the federal government over its improper use of grammar. The lawsuit was unsuccessful. The document filed by Miller included, among other statements:

For the 'why' of the sheriff's-statement-writings and: United States Attorney's-statements-writing are with a second-grade-reading-level and: writing-level and: vacating-facts, opinions, guessing, modifications, viod [sic]-factual-syntax-grammar word-meanings by the vassalees against the collusion-conspiracy with the handycapping [sic]-parse-syntax-grammar-communication-pleadings and: babbling-collusions-threats against the David-Russell: Myrland by the vassalees.

In 2016, two Southampton parents, whose newborn child had been removed from their custody due to healthcare concerns and the father being a Master Mineral Solution salesman, chose to dispense with legal representation in the United Kingdom and consulted with Miller. Largely due to the parents' lack of cooperation with authorities, the baby was placed for adoption.

== Jared Lee Loughner case ==
Some reports published after the 2011 Tucson shooting included references to purported similarities between the writing of convicted gunman Jared Lee Loughner and Miller's writing method. Miller has stated that although he did not know Loughner, he agreed with Loughner's video postings on government mind control and grammar, but was appalled by Loughner's actions. Miller stated that the idea that his work could have inspired the mass shooting was "ridiculous", and "I expect he's been on my website... He's just repeating things I've had up on my site the past 11 years."

== Associates and legacy ==
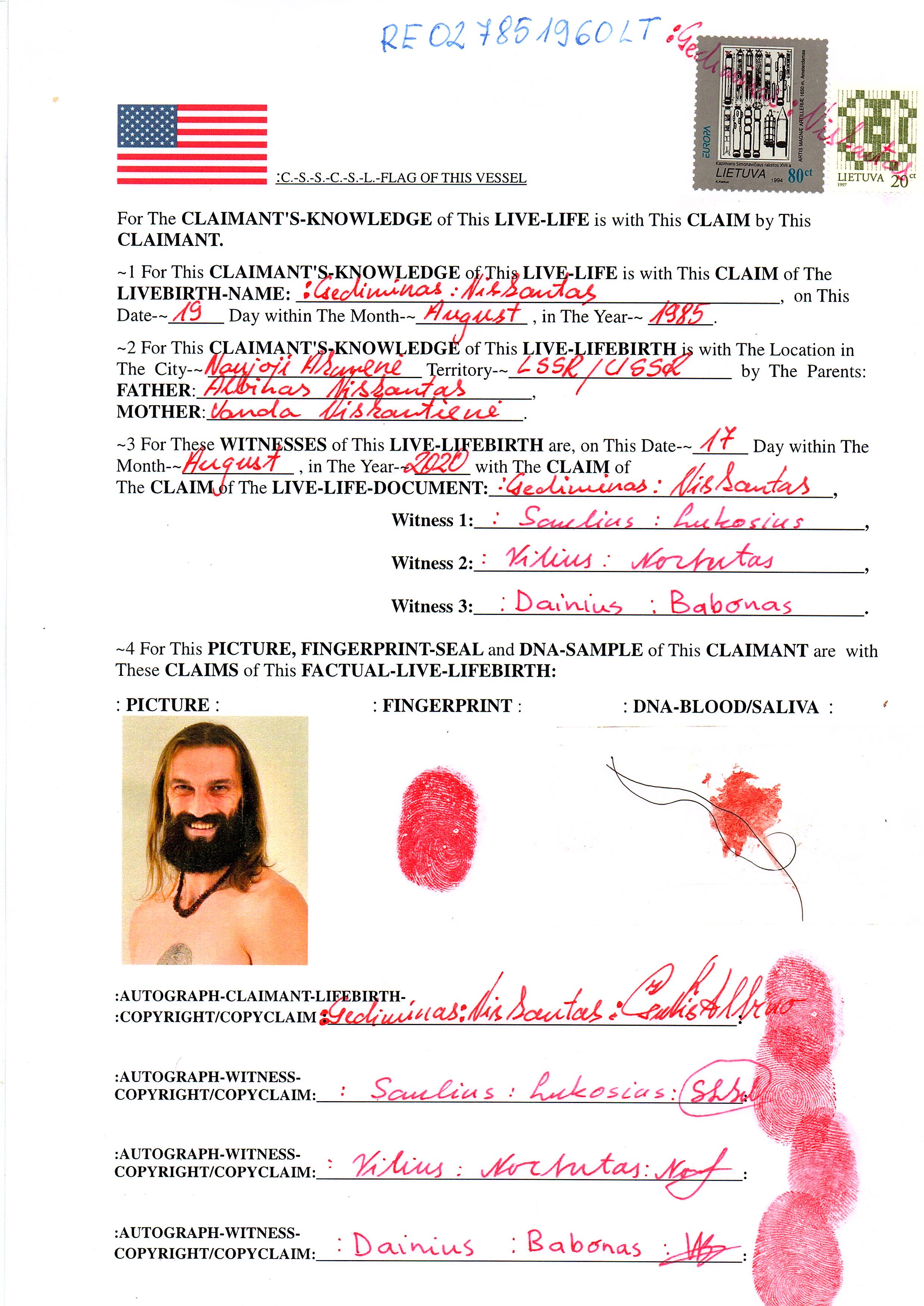
Pseudolegal sovereign citizen document written in Quantum Grammar.

Miller's language is used by various groups and individuals associated with the sovereign citizen and freeman on the land movements, including African-American "Moorish" activists.

One of Miller's associates, Leighton Ward, who worked as "clerk" of the "Federal Postal court", set up his own venture, "The Advocacy for consumer rights", in Arizona. Ward purported to help his clients change the terms of their mortgages and get refunds through the use of Miller's language. He also engaged in paper terrorism against a family, using "judgements" issued by Miller's "Federal Postal court". Ward was arrested in May 2017 and charged with various offenses, including fraudulent schemes and artifices and creating false documents. During his trial, he persisted in using Miller's language in his documents and oral arguments, despite being repeatedly ordered by the court to communicate in a comprehensible fashion. The court eventually revoked his self-representation. In August 2018, he was sentenced to 23 1/2 years in prison.

In August 2017, after Miller suffered a heart attack, one of his longtime collaborators, Russell Jay Gould, published a video in which he purported to "court martial" Miller and to remove his authority as a "judge". The website of Miller's "Federal Postal court" later went offline. Gould has since continued using the "Quantum Grammar" created by Miller, taking part in judicial proceedings and claiming to be the "postmaster-general of the world" or the "sovereign king" of the United States. In 2023, the Anti-Defamation League described Gould as the most popular quantum grammar advocate among sovereign citizen theorists.

In July 2024, a British group led by Mark Kishon Christopher, a Miller disciple, along with Matthew Dean Martin, Sean Harper, and Shiza Harper identifying themselves as the 'Federal Postal Court' or 'the Court for the People' were convicted of conspiring to kidnap the Senior Coroner for Essex. Christopher had appointed himself 'Chief Judge of England and all Dominions', while Martin and Sean Harper were 'Sheriffs'. They had sent a series of threats to the Coroner, and went to the Court, equipped with handcuffs, intending to kidnap him. For this Christopher was sentenced to 7 years in prison, while the others were given 30 month sentences.

== See also ==
- Lojban – Constructed human language based on predicate logic
- Montana Freemen – Anti-government Christian Patriot militia
- Posse Comitatus (organization) – Extremist American anti-government movement
- Tax protester history in the United States – Person who resists paying U.S. taxes
