= Wakefield standoff =

2021 Interstate 95 militia standoff in Massachusetts, US

Location	Interstate 95 near Wakefield, Massachusetts, U.S.
Result	Rise of the Moors members and others captured

Belligerents
Members of the Rise of the Moors and others	Wakefield Police Department; Massachusetts State Police

Casualties and losses
11 arrested	0

On July 3, 2021, a standoff occurred between individuals, some of whom are alleged to be members of a militia group called Rise of the Moors, some of whom were armed, and state and local police officers on Interstate 95 in Wakefield, Massachusetts. This incident began when an officer with the Massachusetts State Police responded to stopped vehicles and allegedly found several in the group carrying long guns, side-arms, and wearing body armor. Police said the group claimed to be traveling from Rhode Island to Maine for training on privately owned land. The standoff lasted several hours and resulted in eleven arrests, of ten adults and one child.

== Background ==
Rise of the Moors is a New England group whose members identify as Moorish Americans. An Instagram account connected to the group says its goal is to continue the work of Noble Drew Ali, founder of the Moorish Science Temple of America. According to The Washington Post, the group is part of the Moorish sovereign-citizen movement, who claim immunity from local, state and federal laws. Similarly, the Southern Poverty Law Center classifies the Rise of the Moors as an "anti-government group" and identifies the Moorish sovereign-citizen movement with the broader sovereign-citizen movement.

== Aftermath ==
About two weeks after the standoff, some of those arrested filed a $70,000,000 civil rights and defamation lawsuit against media outlets, the Massachusetts State Police, some individual troopers involved in the standoff, the presiding arraignment judge, and the Commonwealth of Massachusetts for "violating the claimants civil, national and human rights." The suit was dismissed as it would involve federal intervention in state court proceedings and that the allegations did not demonstrate any defamation.

At arraignment, all of the adults arrested and charged entered pleas of "not guilty", although some later changed their plea to "guilty" as of mid-2024. Several of the adults allegedly changed their names to Moorish Science inspired names. Many of the cases are still pending in Middlesex Superior Court as of mid-2024. Many of the individuals initially were representing themselves, but were also provided an indigent lawyer, or privately retained a lawyer. As of mid-October 2022 all of the defendants have been released from pretrial detention.

They were found guilty (June 17, 2024) and on July 16, 2024, Jamhal Tavon Sanders Latimer was sentenced to three to five years in prison for his involvement in the standoff. Steven Anthony Perez was sentenced to just over a year. Both received an additional four years of probation.
