= Moorish sovereign citizens =

Group of sovereign citizens

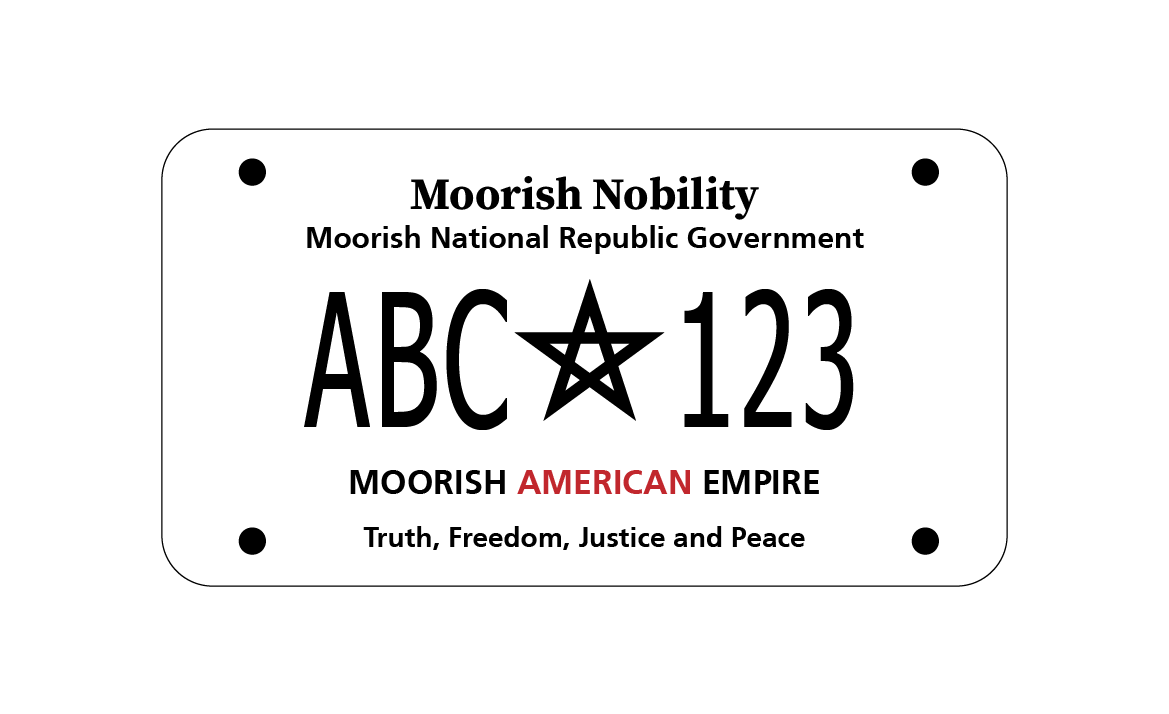
Example illustration of an irregular "Moorish" license plate.

The Moorish sovereign citizen movement, sometimes called the indigenous sovereign citizen movement, Neo-Moors or the Rise of the Moors, is a sub-group of sovereign citizens that mainly holds to the teachings of the Moorish Science Temple of America, a religious group that argues that African Americans are descendants of the Moroccan Moabites (descendants of the Hebrew Biblical Abraham's nephew Lot) and thus are "Moorish" by nationality and Islamic by faith.

== History ==
During the 1990s, the Moorish sovereign citizen movement was started by former followers of the Moorish Science Temple of America and the Washitaw Nation. Groups classified as Moorish sovereigns have included Dwight York's Nuwaubian Nation.

== Beliefs ==
Members believe the United States federal government to be illegitimate, which they attribute to a variety of factors, including racist and dysfunctional policy during the Reconstruction era following the American Civil War and the abandonment of the gold standard in the 1930s. The number of Moorish sovereign citizens is uncertain but possibly ranges between 3,000 and 6,000 organized mostly in small groups of several dozen.

In addition to the Moorish Science Temple doctrine that Black Americans are of Moorish descent, Moorish sovereign citizens claim legal immunity from U.S. federal, state, and local laws, stemming from a mistaken belief that the Moroccan–American Treaty of Friendship (1786) grants them sovereignty. In reality, the 1786 treaty was primarily a trade agreement.

Some also believe that Black Americans are indigenous to the United States. The Moorish sovereign citizen movement has also expanded to include a few White Americans.

The Southern Poverty Law Center classifies Moorish sovereign citizens as an extremist anti-government group. Tactics used by the group include filing false deeds and property claims, false liens against government officials, frivolous legal motions to overwhelm courts, and invented legalese used in court appearances and filings. Various groups and individuals identifying as Moorish sovereign citizens have used the unorthodox "quantum grammar" created by David Wynn Miller. An article syndicated by the Associated Press states that the Moorish Science Temple of America has disavowed any affiliation with those responsible, calling them "radical and subversive fringe groups" and also states that "Moorish leaders are looking into legal remedies". The article also quotes an academic who has been advising authorities on how to distinguish registered Temple members from impostors in the sovereign citizen movement.

== Incidents ==
Some "Moorish" activists have practiced hostile possession of properties, citing "reparations" as a justification for their actions, even though their victims included other Black Americans. In June 2021, Hubert A. John, a self-identified citizen of the Al Moroccan Empire, was arrested and charged with counts of criminal mischief, burglary, criminal trespass and terroristic threats after he occupied a house in Newark, New Jersey, claiming that it fell into the jurisdiction of the Al Moroccan Empire.

In 2005, musician Roy "Future Man" Wooten pleaded guilty to income tax evasion after being indicted in 2001 on charges that he had failed to file or pay taxes between 1995 and 1998. He was affiliated with the Washitaw Nation. Before his guilty plea, he had been judged possibly incapable of assisting in his own defense after filing incomprehensible sovereign citizen paperwork with the court.

In 2016, Washitaw Nation affiliate Gavin Eugene Long ambushed six police officers and killed three of them in Baton Rouge, Louisiana. Police killed Long in the resulting confrontation. A Rise of the Moors member had earlier been arrested in Danvers, Massachusetts, in 2019 on an outstanding warrant. He alleged his arrest was unlawful and filed a federal lawsuit against the police, which was dismissed after he tried to pay the court fees with a silver coin, saying U.S. currency was unconstitutional because it was "not backed by anything of value".

In July 2021, eleven male individuals identifying themselves as a group called Rise of the Moors were arrested on Interstate 95 in Wakefield, Massachusetts, after a state trooper responding to disabled vehicles allegedly found the group carrying long guns, side-arms, and wearing tactical body armor. Police said the group claimed to be traveling from Rhode Island to Maine for "training" on their privately owned land. An Instagram account belonging to the group says its goal is to continue the work of Noble Drew Ali.

On August 23, 2023, 63-year-old William Hardison Sr. opened fire on Pittsburgh, Pennsylvania law enforcement officers attempting to serve an eviction notice on him for occupying a former family home that had been sold after the death of the original owner. Over a hundred rounds were fired between Hardison and multiple officers in the city's Garfield neighborhood. The standoff lasted several hours before Hardison was eventually shot dead by police. The shooting started at 11 a.m. and ended at around 5 p.m, and was described by the Pittsburgh Post-Gazette as "perhaps the biggest gun battle in [Pittsburgh's] history". Over 70 police officers were placed on leave over the incident, pending investigation by higher authorities. Hardison was a self-declared Moorish sovereign citizen.

== See also ==
- Moorish movement
