= Islamic Republic of Iran Army Day =

Iranian public holiday, 18 April

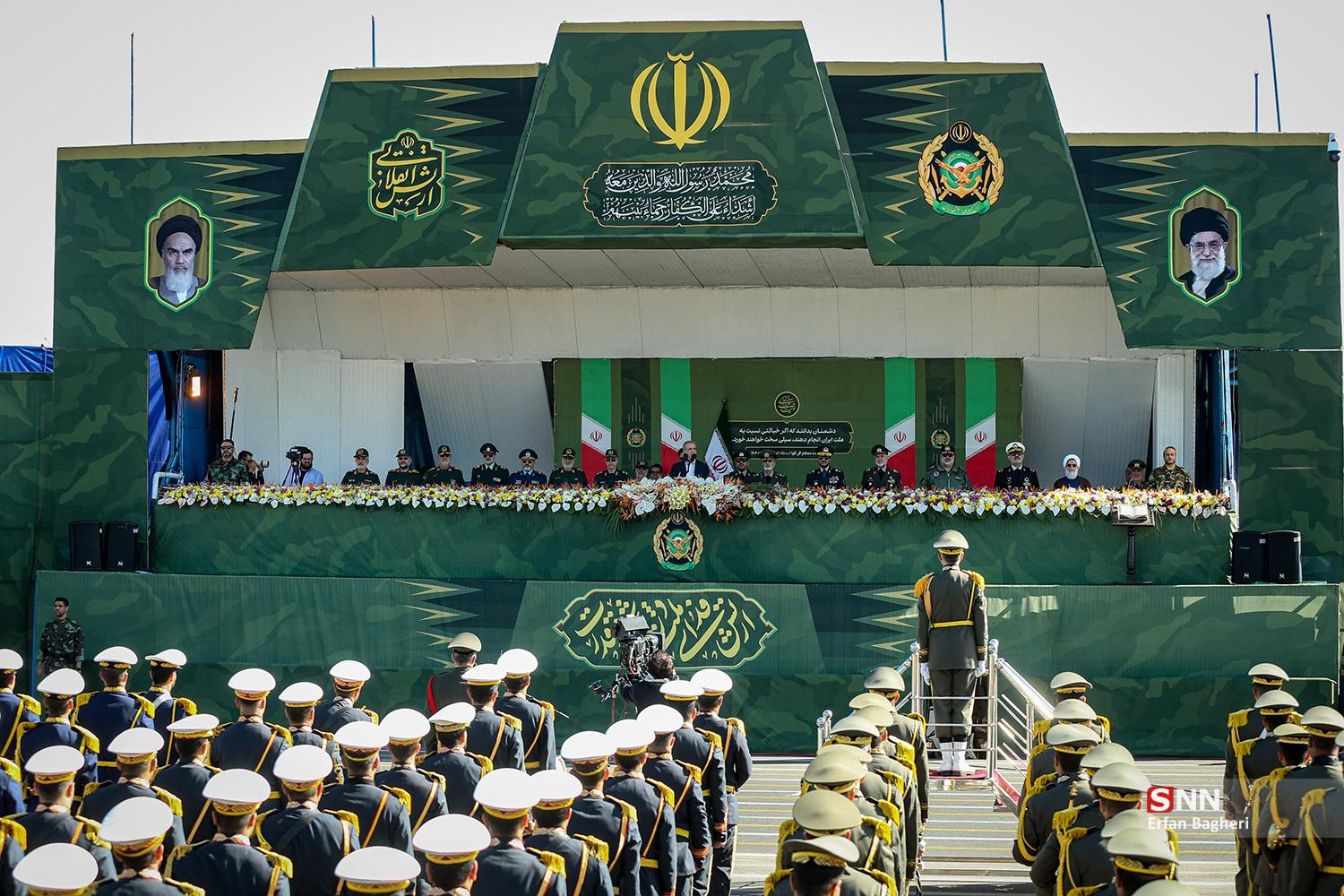
- IRI Army Day parade, Tehran, 2025
- Also called: Army Day
- Observed by: Iran
- Celebrations: Military parades, ceremonies
- Date: 18 April
- Next time: 18 April 2027
- Frequency: annual

Islamic Republic of Iran Army Day (Persian: روز ارتش جمهوری اسلامی ایران) is a national holiday of Iran, celebrated annually on 18 April. The day of the Iranian Army has been celebrated since 1921.

== History ==
The current holiday was established by the former Supreme Leader of Iran, Ruhollah Khomeini on 18 April 1979. Previously, Army Day was celebrated on 21 February (3 Esfand) to commemorate the 1921 Persian coup d'état during the Qajar era. The holiday was moved to 12 December (28 Azar) in 1946 by Mohammad Reza Pahlavi as it was the date when the Imperial Iranian Army defeated the Soviet-backed Azerbaijan People's Government.

On 8 April 1979, two months after the fall of the Shah, Khomeini met with Iranian Armed Forces soldiers who made an invaluable contribution to the victory of the revolution. Ten days later, Khomeini named 18 April as Army Day, during a speech to the people calling for military parades to exhibit the nation's military preparedness.

== Celebrations ==
The Iranian government makes a show of military force on Iran Army Day with parades every 18 April, often demonstrating new defense technologies. Army veterans, active servicemen and reservists, also take part in the annually held parade. The parade is held in front of the Mausoleum of Ruhollah Khomeini.

== Gallery ==
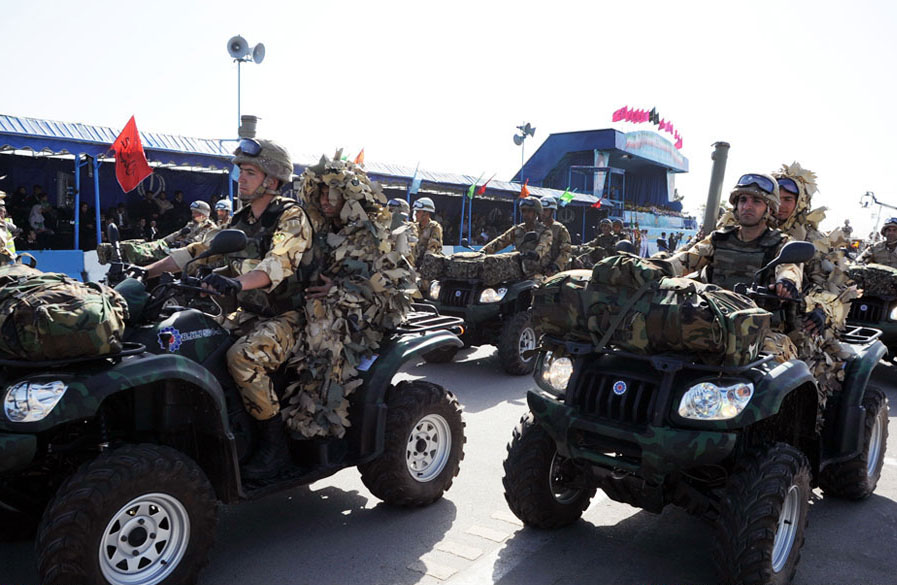
IRIA 2011 parade

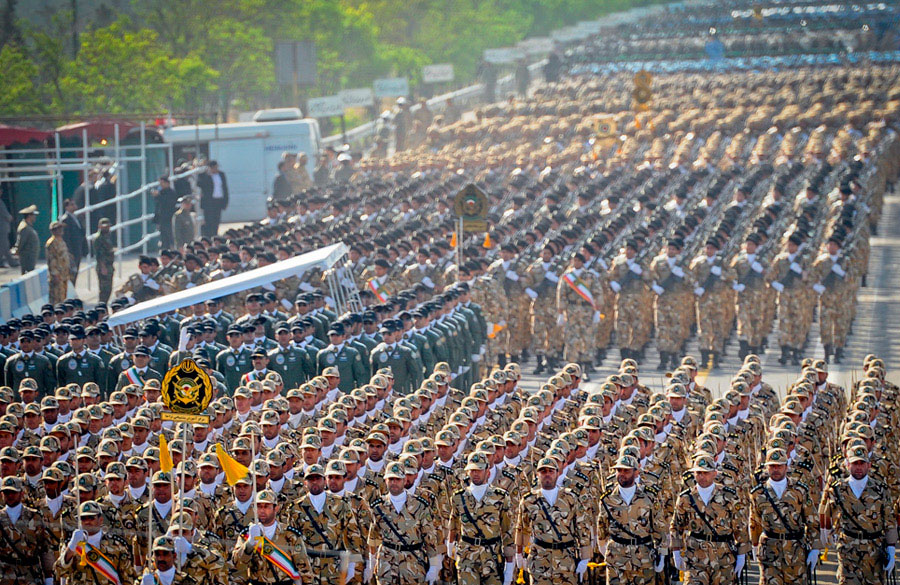
2012 parade

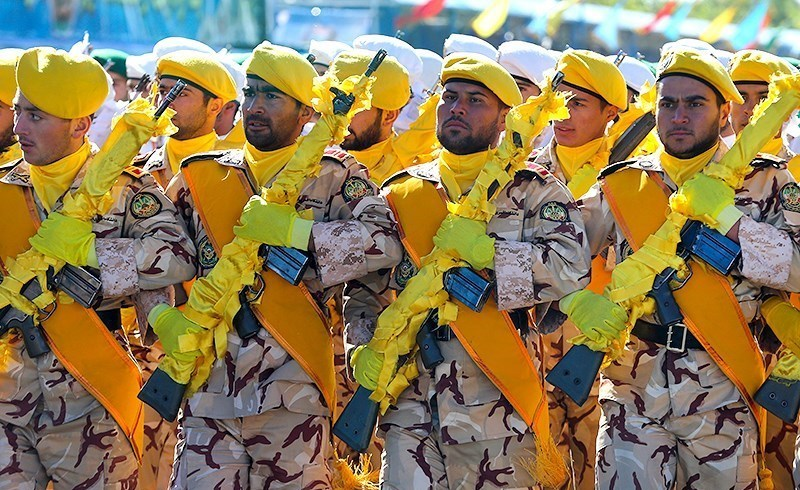
2016 parade

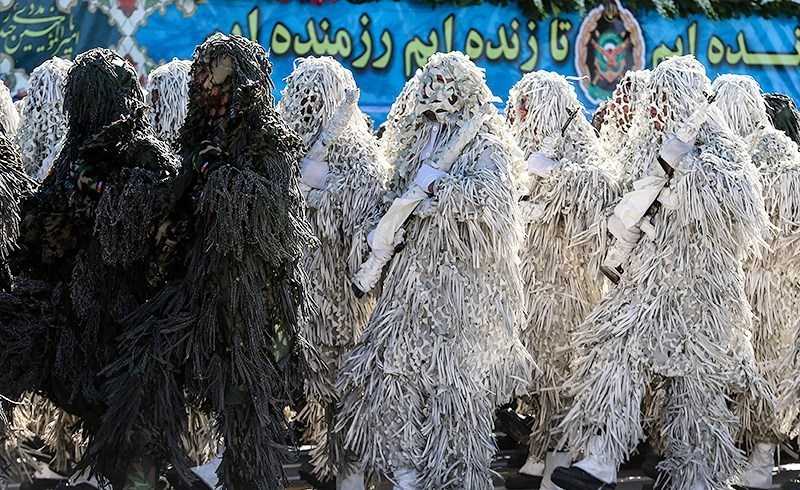
2016 parade

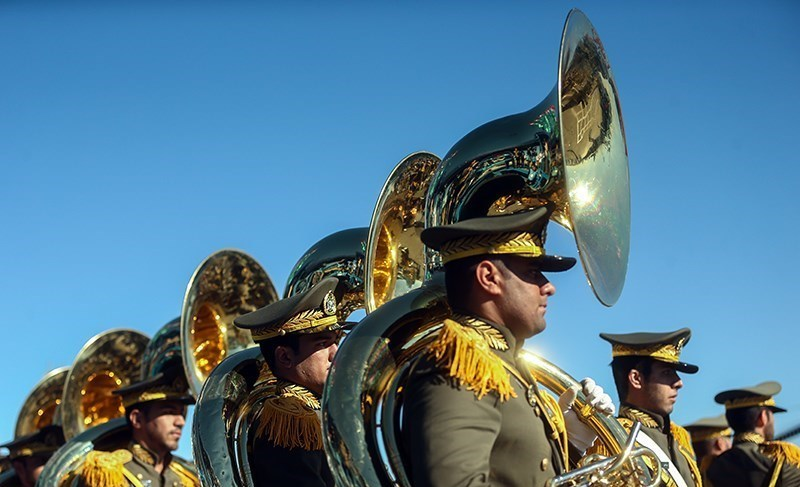
2016 parade

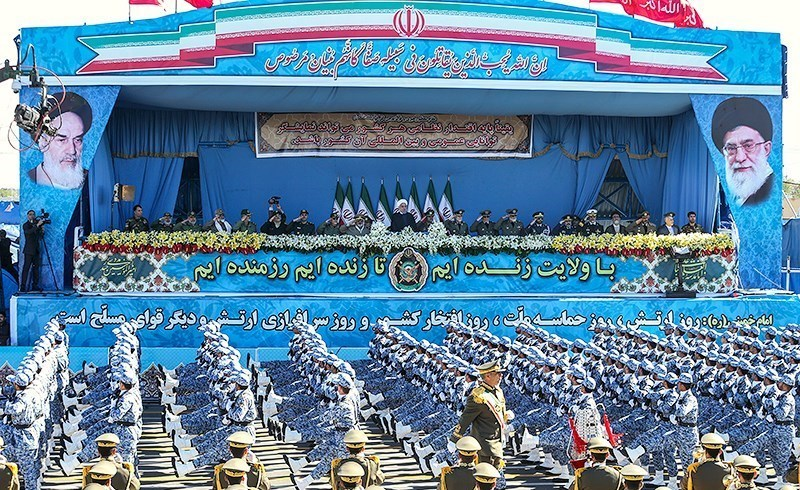
2016 parade

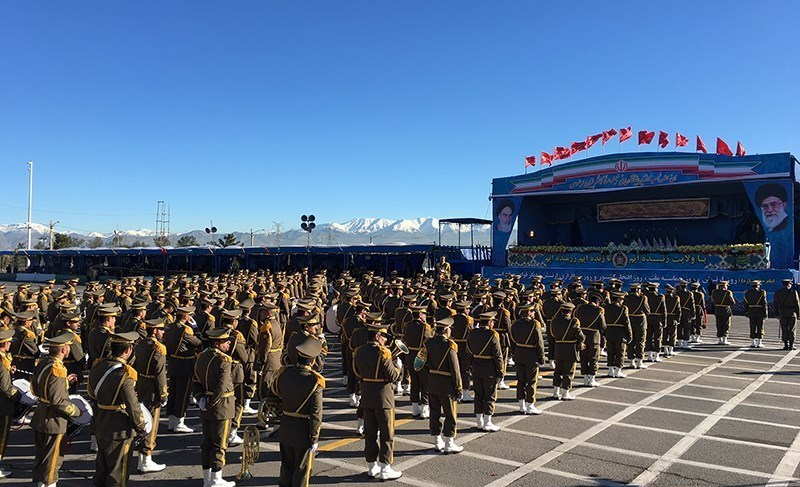
2016 parade

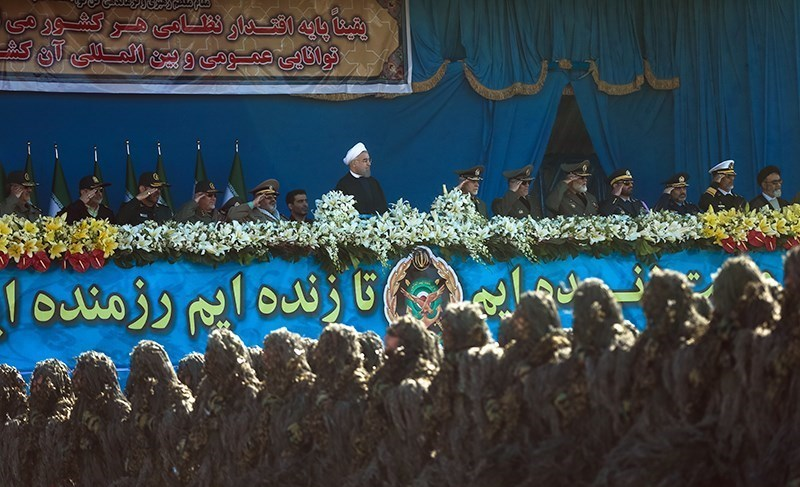
2016 parade

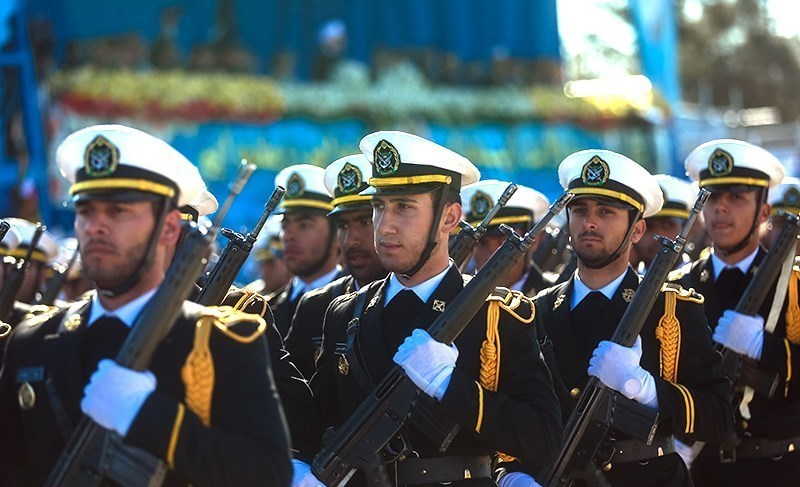
2016 parade

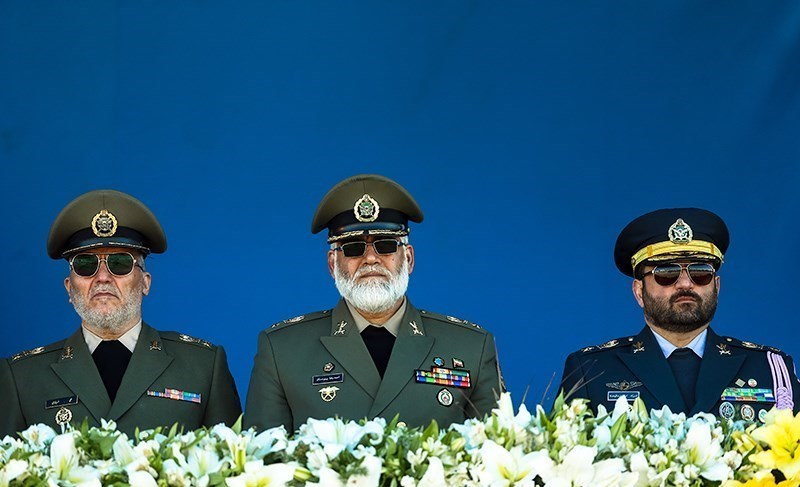
2016 parade

== See also ==
- Public holidays in Iran
- Armed Forces Day

== Videos ==
- Iranian Army Day 2018
