= Doria Sharaf El-Din =

Egyptian politician

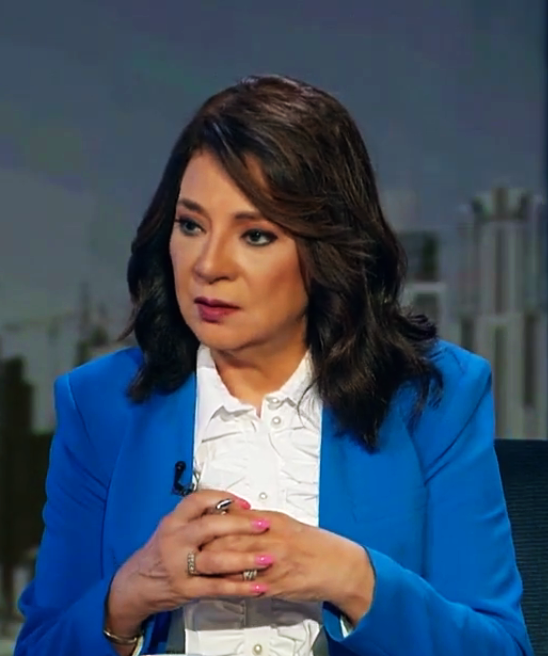

Former Minister of Information

Personal details
- Education: Cairo University

Doria Sharaf El-Din (born 30 May 1948) is an Egyptian media figure, writer, and politician. She is the former Egypt's Minister of Information and currently the Head of the Culture, Media, and Antiquities Committee in the Egyptian House of Representatives.

== Early life and education ==
Doria Sharaf El-Din was Born in Damietta Governorate, Egypt. She bagged her higher education degree certificate from Cairo University, where she studied at the Faculty of Economics and Political Science. She later earned a Ph.D. from the Academy of Arts.

== Media career ==
Sharaf El-Din gained prominence as the host of the long-running television program Cinema Club (Nadi El-Cinema), which aired on Egyptian Channel One. The show introduced Egyptian audiences to international films and provided critical analyses of cinematic works, that influences Egypt's cultural landscape.

== Political career ==
In July 2013, Sharaf El-Din was appointed as Egypt's Minister of Information, becoming the first woman to hold this position.

== Honors and recognition ==
Sharaf El-Din was honored at the seventh edition of the Aswan International Women Film Festival in March 2023. The festival acknowledged her efforts in promoting cinematic culture and supporting the arts in Egypt.
