= United States Army Birthdays =

1775 foundation of the U.S. Army

The U.S. Army was founded on 14 June 1775, when the Continental Congress authorized enlistment of riflemen to serve the United Colonies for one year. June 14th is celebrated as the U.S. Army Birthday.

June 14th is when the Congress adopted "the American continental army" after reaching a consensus position in The Committee of the Whole. This procedure and the desire for secrecy account for the sparseness of the official journal entries for the day. The record indicates only that Congress undertook to raise ten companies of riflemen, approved an enlistment form for them, and appointed a committee (including Washington and Schuyler) to draft rules and regulations for the government of the army.

The delegates' correspondence, diaries, and subsequent actions make it clear that they really did much more. They also accepted responsibility for the existing New England troops and forces requested for the defense of the various points in New York. The former were believed to total 10,000 men; the latter, both New Yorkers and Connecticut men, another 5,000.

At least some members of Congress assumed from the beginning that this force would be expanded. That expansion, in the form of increased troop ceilings at Boston, came very rapidly as better information arrived regarding the actual numbers of New England troops. By the third week in June delegates were referring to 15,000 at Boston. When on 19 June Congress requested the governments of Connecticut, Rhode Island, and New Hampshire to forward to Boston "such of the forces as are already embodied, towards their quotas of the troops agreed to be raised by the New England Colonies," it gave a clear indication of its intent to adopt the regional army. Discussions the next day indicated that Congress was prepared to support a force at Boston twice the size of the British garrison, and that it was unwilling to order any existing units to be disbanded. By the first week in July delegates were referring to a total at Boston that was edging toward 20,000. Maximum strengths for the forces both in Massachusetts and New York were finally established on 21 and 22 July, when solid information was on hand. These were set, respectively, at 22,000 and 5,000 men, a total nearly double that envisioned on 14 June.

The "expert riflemen" authorized on 14 June were the first units raised directly as Continentals. Congress intended to have the ten companies serve as a light infantry force for the Boston siege. At the same time it symbolically extended military participation beyond New England by allocating 6 of the companies to Pennsylvania, 2 to Maryland, and 2 to Virginia. Each company would have a captain, 3 lieutenants, 4 sergeants, 4 corporals, a drummer (or horn player), and 68 privates. The enlistment period was set at one year, the norm for the earlier Provincials, a period that would expire on 1 July 1776. Responsibility for recruiting the companies was given to the three colonies' delegates, who in turn relied on the county committees of those areas noted for skilled marksmen. The response in Pennsylvania's western and northern frontier counties was so great that on 22 June the colony's quota was increased from six to eight companies, organized as a regiment. On 25 June the Pennsylvania delegates, with authority from the Pennsylvania Assembly, appointed field officers for the regiment. Since there was no staff organization, company officers and volunteers performed the necessary duties.

On 11 July delegate George Read secured the adoption of a ninth company that his wife's nephew had organized in Lancaster County. In Virginia, Daniel Morgan raised one company in Frederick County, and Hugh Stephenson raised another in Berkeley County. Michael Cresap's and Thomas Price's Maryland companies were both from Frederick County. All thirteen companies were organized during late June and early July. They then raced to Boston, where their frontier attitudes created disciplinary problems.

== Selection of Commanders ==
The inclusion of troops from outside New England gave a continental flavor to the army at Boston. A desire to broaden the base of support for the war also led John Adams to work for the appointment of a southerner as the commander of all the continental forces, raised, or to be raised, for the defense of American liberty. On 15 June Congress unanimously chose George Washington. Washington had been active in the military planning committees of Congress and by late May had taken to wearing his old uniform. His colleagues believed that his modesty and competence qualified him to adjust to the "Temper & Genius" of the New England troops. Washington was given the rank of General and Commander in Chief.

Congress clearly respected Washington, for it granted him extensive powers which combined functions of a regular British commander with the military responsibilities of a colonial governor. His instructions on 20 June told him to proceed to Massachusetts, "take charge of the army of the United Colonies," and capture or destroy all armed enemies. His was also to prepare and to send to Congress an accurate strength return of that army. On the other hand, instructions to keep the army obedient, diligent, and disciplined were rather vague. The Commander in Chief's right to make strategic and tactical decisions on purely military grounds was limited only by a requirement to listen to the advice of a council of war. Within a set troop maximum, including volunteers, Washington had the right to determine how many men to retain, and he had the power to fill temporarily any vacancies below the rank of colonel. Permanent promotions and appointments were reserved for the colonial governments to make.

Although sectional politics were involved in Washington's selection, in strictly military terms he was in fact the best-qualified native American. He had begun his military career in 1752 in the Virginia militia as one of four regional adjutants responsible for training. During the first phase of the French and Indian War, he served with gallantry as Edward Braddock's volunteer aide at the battle of the Monongahela, and later as the commander of Virginia's two Provincial regiments defending the colony's frontiers. In 1758 he commanded a brigade composed of Virginia, Maryland, and Pennsylvania units on John Forbes' expedition against Fort Duquesne. Washington was the only American in that war to command so large a force. The experience of these years taught him the importance of discipline, marksmanship, and professional study. Exposure to Forbes' ideas on adapting European tactics to the American wilderness also contributed significantly to his military education. Above all, he came to the conclusion that only unyielding commitment to hard work and attention to administrative detail could keep troops in the field.

On 16 June, the day after Washington's appointment, Congress authorized a variety of other senior officers for its new army. Details were again settled by the Committee of the Whole. Positions for five major staff officers were established: an Adjutant General, a Commissary of Musters, a Paymaster General, a Commissary General, and a Quartermaster General. These officers were expected to assist the Commander in Chief with the administration of the "grand army." The forces allocated to New York already were considered a separate department and were authorized their own deputy quartermaster general and deputy paymaster general. A military secretary and 3 aides for Washington, a secretary for the separate department, and 6 engineers (3 for each force) completed the staff. Congress also created the ranks of major general and brigadier general. The number of generals remained uncertain for several days as Congress debated. Between 17 and 22 June it finally decided on 4 major generals, each having 2 aides, and 8 brigadier generals. These totals allowed each colony raising troops to have a share of the patronage. Congress then took steps for issuing paper money to finance the army, and on 30 June it adopted the Articles of War.

Selection of the subordinate generals and senior staff officers led to political maneuvering as delegates sought appointments for favorite sons. On 17 June Congress elected Artemas Ward and Charles Lee as the first and second major generals and Horatio Gates as the Adjutant General. Ward received seniority because he was in command at Boston and because Massachusetts had furnished the largest contingent of troops. Ward was a Harvard graduate with many years of political experience. After two years of active duty as a field officer in the French and Indian War, he had compiled an excellent record as a militia administrator. Lee and Gates were professional English officers in their forties who were living in Virginia on the half-pay (inactive) list. Both had served in the French and Indian War and were associates of politicians in England and America who opposed British policies. Lee had also seen service in Portugal and in the Polish Army. Gates had ended the Seven Years' War as a major in the Caribbean. His appointment as Adjutant General (with the rank of brigadier general) reflected Congress' hope that his staff experience would enable him to provide Washington with strong administrative assistance.

On 19 June two more major generals were appointed to satisfy other colonies' contributing large troop contingents. Philip Schuyler, a New York delegate with close ties to Washington, was expected to take command of the troops in his colony. A member of one of New York's leading families, the 42-year-old Schuyler had been a major in the French and Indian War, specializing in logistics. His experience, political connections, and extensive business interests in Albany were particularly valuable in his new command. Connecticut's delegation could not agree on a nominee for that colony's major general. In the end Israel Putnam's status as a folk hero outweighed consideration of seniority, and he received the appointment. Putnam, at 57, had seen extensive service in the French and Indian War, rising to the rank of lieutenant colonel. He had also been an early, vocal leader of the Connecticut Sons of Liberty. The process of selecting brigadier generals on 22 June was the product of a compromise. Congress allotted these appointments in proportion to the number of men contributed by each colony and followed the recommendations of the colony's delegates in the actual selection. Congress, however, created problems by ignoring seniority and status. When it elected Massachusetts' Seth Pomeroy, William Heath, and John Thomas as the first, fourth, and sixth brigadier generals, respectively, Thomas felt he had been slighted. The situation was resolved when Pomeroy declined the appointment, citing age, before Washington handed out the commissions. Congress then made Thomas the first brigadier general, although it did not fill the vacancy created by Pomeroy's withdrawal. Thomas, a surgeon militiamen, and former Provincial born in 1724, had gained combat experience primarily in medical roles. Heath, thirteen years younger, was strictly a product of the militia.

Richard Montgomery of New York became the second ranking brigadier general. Born in Ireland in 1738 and educated at Dublin's Trinity College, he had entered the British Army in 1756. After combat service in North America and in the Caribbean, he resigned in 1772 when he failed to receive a promotion to major. He moved to New York, married into the powerful Livingston family, and in 1775 won election to the New York Provincial Congress. Montgomery's appointment was intended to complement Schuyler's logistical and administrative skills with combat experience. David Wooster and Joseph Spencer of Connecticut became the third and fifth brigadier generals. Born in 1711 and educated at Yale, Wooster had served in Connecticut's navy during King George's War. He later commanded a regiment in the French and Indian War. Spencer, three years younger, had also served in both wars. The two men initially refused to serve under Putnam, disputing his seniority, and had to be coaxed into accepting their commissions. Delegate John Sullivan of New Hampshire, a 35-yearold lawyer, became the seventh brigadier general instead of Nathaniel Folsom. Nathanael Greene of Rhode Island completed the list.

In retrospect, the June 1775 decision of the Continental Congress to create the Continental Army seems remarkably free from political strife. Delegates of all shades of opinion supported each step, and arguments largely concerned technical details. Unanimity resulted from a conviction that British actions required defensive measures and from carefully worded compromises. Those individuals committed to the ideal of the citizen-soldier saw Congress' adoption of the short-term New England force as an acceptance of a yeoman army. Others, remembering practical lessons of the colonial wars, believed that they were forming an army based on the Provincial model. Officer selection was another area of compromise; the fact that Washington and Schuyler were given blank commissions from Congress to distribute to the regimental officers confirmed local selections while retaining a nominal national level of appointment.

== Basic branches ==
=== Infantry, 14 June 1775 ===
Ten companies of riflemen were authorized by a resolution of the Continental Congress on 14 June 1775. However, the oldest Regular Army infantry regiment, the 3d, was constituted on 3 June 1784, as the First American Regiment.

=== Adjutant General's Corps, 16 June 1775 ===
The post of Adjutant General was established 16 June 1775, and has been continuously in operation since that time. The Adjutant General's Department, by that name, was established by the act of 3 March 1813, and was redesignated the Adjutant General's Corps in 1950.

=== Corps of Engineers, 16 June 1775 ===
Continental Congress authority for a "Chief Engineer for the Army" dates from 16 June 1775. A corps of Engineers for the United States was authorized by the Congress on 11 March 1779. The Corps of Engineers as it is known today came into being on 16 March 1802, when the President was authorized to "organize and establish a Corps of Engineers ... that the said Corps ... shall be stationed at West Point in the State of New York and shall constitute a Military Academy." A Corps of Topographical Engineers, authorized on 4 July 1838, was merged with the Corps of Engineers in March 1863.

=== Finance Corps, 16 June 1775 ===
The Finance Corps is the successor to the old Pay Department, which was created in June 1775. The Finance Department was created by law on 1 July 1920. It became the Finance Corps in 1950.

=== Quartermaster Corps, 16 June 1775 ===
The Quartermaster Corps, originally designated the Quartermaster Department, was established on 16 June 1775. While numerous additions, deletions, and changes of function have occurred, its basic supply and service support functions have continued in existence.

=== Field Artillery, 17 November 1775 ===
The Continental Congress unanimously elected Henry Knox "Colonel of the Regiment of Artillery" on 17 November 1775. The regiment formally entered service on 1 January 1776.

=== Office of Mounted Commands, 12 December 1776 ===
The Armor branch traces its origin to the Cavalry. Four regiments of Continental Light Dragoons were authorized to be raised by the Continental Congress Resolve of 12 December 1776. Although mounted units were raised at various times after the Revolution, the first unit to have prolonged service was the United States Regiment of Dragoons, organized in 1833. The oldest continuous service is the Second Regiment of Dragoons, established in 1836. The Tank Corps was formed on 5 March 1918 as part of the WW-I AEF. The Armored Force was formed on 10 July 1940. Armor became a permanent branch of the Army in 1950.

=== Ordnance Corps, 14 May 1812 ===
The Ordnance Department was established by act of Congress on 14 May 1812. During the Revolutionary War, ordnance material was under supervision of the Board of War and Ordnance. Numerous shifts in duties and responsibilities have occurred in the Ordnance Corps since colonial times. It acquired its present designation in 1950.

=== Signal Corps, 21 June 1860 ===
The Signal Corps was authorized as a separate branch of the Army by act of Congress on 3 March 1863. However, the Signal Corps dates its existence from 21 June 1860, when Congress authorized the appointment of one signal officer in the Army, and a War Department order carried the following assignment: "Signal Department—Assistant Surgeon Albert J. Myer to be Signal Officer, with the rank of Major, 27 June 1860, to fill an original vacancy."

=== Chemical Corps, 28 June 1918 ===
The Chemical Warfare Service was established on 28 June 1918, combining activities that until then had been dispersed among five separate agencies of Government. It was made a permanent branch of the Regular Army by the National Defense Act of 1920. In 1945, it was redesignated the Chemical Corps.

=== Military Police Corps, 26 September 1941 ===
A Provost Marshal General's Office and Corps of Military Police were established in 1941. Prior to that time, except during the Civil War and World War I, there was no regularly appointed Provost Marshal General or regularly constituted Military Police Corps, although a "Provost Marshal" can be found as early as January 1776, and a "Provost Corps" as early as 1778.

=== Transportation Corps, 31 July 1942 ===
The historical background of the Transportation Corps starts with World War I. Prior to that time, transportation operations were chiefly the responsibility of the Quartermaster General. The Transportation Corps, essentially in its present form, was organized on 31 July 1942.

=== Military Intelligence, 1 July 1962 ===
Intelligence has been an essential element of Army operations during war as well as during periods of peace. In the past, requirements were met by personnel from the Army Intelligence and Army Security Reserve branches, two-year obligated tour officers, one-tour levies on the various branches, and Regular Army officers in the specialization programs. To meet the Army's increased requirement for national and tactical intelligence, an Intelligence and Security Branch was established in the Army effective 1 July 1962, by General Orders No. 38, 3 July 1962. On 1 July 1967, the branch was redesignated as Military Intelligence.

=== Aviation, 12 April 1983 ===
Following the establishment of the U.S. Air Force as a separate service in 1947, the Army began to develop further its own aviation assets (light planes and rotary wing aircraft) in support of ground operations. The Korean War gave this drive impetus, and the war in Vietnam saw its fruition, as Army aviation units performed a variety of missions, including reconnaissance, transport, and fire support. After the war in Vietnam, the role of armed helicopters as tank destroyers received new emphasis. In recognition of the growing importance of aviation in Army doctrine and operations, Aviation became a separate branch on 12 April 1983, and a full member of the Army's combined arms team.

=== Special Forces, 9 April 1987 ===
The first Special Forces unit in the Army was formed on 11 June 1952, when the 10th Special Forces Group was activated at Fort Bragg, North Carolina. A major expansion of Special Forces occurred during the 1960s, with a total of eighteen groups organized in the Regular Army, Army Reserve, and Army National Guard. As a result of renewed emphasis on special operations in the 1980s, the Special Forces Branch was established as a basic branch of the Army effective 9 April 1987, by General Orders No. 35, 19 June 1987.

== Special branches ==
=== Army Medical Department, 27 July 1775 ===
The Army Medical Department and the Medical Corps trace their origins to 27 July 1775, when the Continental Congress established the Army hospital headed by a "Director General and Chief Physician." Congress provided a medical organization of the Army only in time of war or emergency until 1818, which marked the inception of a permanent and continuous Medical Department. The Army Nurse Corps dates from 1901, the Dental Corps from 1911, the Veterinary Corps from 1916, the Medical Service Corps from 1917, and the Army Medical Specialist Corps from 1947. The Army Organization Act of 1950 renamed the Medical Department as the Army Medical Service. On 4 June 1968, the Army Medical Service was redesignated the Army Medical Department.

=== Chaplains, 29 July 1775 ===
The legal origin of the Chaplains is found in a resolution of the Continental Congress, adopted 29 July 1775, which made provision for the pay of chaplains. The Office of the Chief of Chaplains was created by the National Defense Act of 1920.

=== Judge Advocate General's Corps, 29 July 1775 ===
The Office of Judge Advocate of the Army may be deemed to have been created on 29 July 1775, and has generally paralleled the origin and development of the American system of military justice. The Judge Advocate General's Department, by that name, was established in 1884. Its present designation as a corps was enacted in 1948.

=== Civil Affairs, 17 August 1955 ===
The Civil Affairs/Military Government Branch in the Army Reserve Branch was established on 17 August 1955. It was later redesignated the Civil Affairs Branch on 2 October 1959, and it has continued its mission to provide guidance to commanders in a broad spectrum of activities ranging from host–guest relationships to the assumption of executive, legislative, and judicial processes in occupied or liberated areas.
