= United States Navy Birthday =

Annual ceremony held by the Navy League of the United States

The United States Navy Birthday is an annual celebratory ball and ceremony held by the Navy League of the United States (NLUS) in Washington, D.C., and in other cities around the world. The United States Navy celebration is always on October 13, the day the Continental Congress passed a resolution to establish a navy in 1775. In 2018, the 243rd birthday was scheduled for the Ronald Reagan Building and International Trade Center in Washington, D.C.

== History ==
The founding of the U.S. Navy dates back to the Revolutionary War. George Washington created the United States' first naval fleet by converting three Massachusetts schooners into warships. The makeshift fleet's purpose was to intercept an unarmed British supply ship. The next day, Washington sent a letter to Congress urging them to establish a naval force. On October 13, the Continental Congress passed a resolution in order to create the Continental Navy. This date now represents the official establishment of the U.S. Navy.

In 1972, the Chief of Naval Operations Elmo Zumwalt designated October 13 as the Navy's official birthday, in order "to enhance a greater appreciation of our Navy heritage, and to provide a positive influence toward pride and professionalism in the naval service." Since then each CNO has encouraged and celebrated the Navy's birthday.

== Celebration ==
In contrast with Navy Day, the Navy's Birthday is an internal activity for members of the active forces and reserves, as well as retirees and dependents.

== Navy Ball ==
Each year, NLUS hosts a ball and ceremony in the Washington, D.C., capital region. The Chief of Naval Operations sends out invites to a wide variety of officials and officers such as the Secretary of Defense, Secretary of the Navy, Chief of Staff of the Army, Chief of Staff of the Air Force, Commandant of the Marine Corps, Commandant of the Coast Guard, and the former CNO.

Navy ball is a formal event. Active duty and male midshipman wear Service Dress Uniforms, while female midshipman wear conservative dresses or modified SDBs. NLUS schedules the evening around a keynote speech, dinner and desserts, cake cutting ceremony, official toasts from high level officers, and musical performances.
