= Chouf TV =

Moroccan media company

- Industry: Media
- Founded: 2013; 13 years ago
- Founder: Driss Chahtane
- Owner: S W Media, LLC

Chouf TV (Arabic: شوف تيفي) is an arabophone Moroccan media company created in 2013 by Driss Chahtane and owned by S W Media, LLC, of which Chahtane is the sole shareholder.

It has been described as an "unprecedented media phenomenon". It primarily produces tabloid-style videos with exaggerated headlines, and emotionally charged language. Chouf TV has been regularly accused of violating the privacy of public figures and everyday individuals. It has a pro-establishment and ultra-nationalist editorial line.

== Name ==
In Moroccan vernacular Arabic, شوف (shūf) is the imperative of the verb شاف (shāf, "to look"). The company's name in Latin script is romanized according to French orthography.

== History ==
The founder of the company, Driss Chahtane was the previous publishing director of Al-Michaal newspaper. He was sentenced to one year in prison for sexual assault, and publishing of adult content, and was incarcerated in Morocco in 2009, but he was released by order from Mohammed VI in 2010.

Driss said: "The idea at the beginning was to present something new, as I saw that the readership of the written press was eroding. The transition was digital. At the time, newspapers used the digital but in a very traditional way."

The media company publishes content with the potential to create buzz.
