= Islam in New York City =

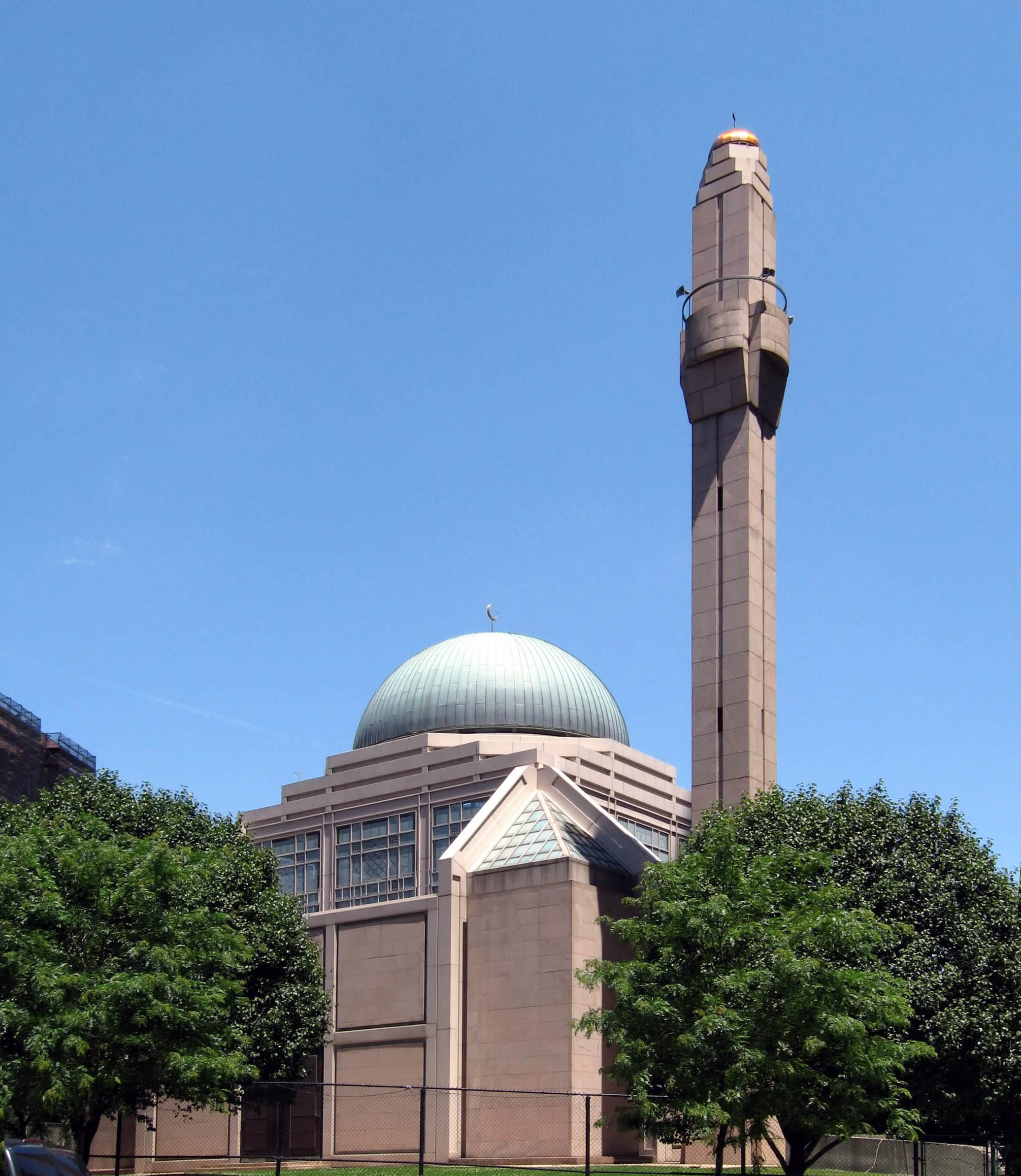
The Islamic Cultural Center of New York in Manhattan was one of the first purpose-built mosques and Islamic cultural centers in New York City.

Islam is the third most widely professed religion in New York City, after Christianity and Judaism. A 2018 study estimated that there are over 750,000 Muslims living in New York City, the largest population of Muslims by city in the United States. Approximately 9% of New York City residents are Muslim, constituting 22.3% of American Muslims, with 1.5 million Muslims in the greater New York metropolitan area, representing the largest metropolitan Muslim population in the Americas—and the most ethnically diverse Muslim population of any city in the world.

== History ==
=== Colonial Muslims ===
The history of Islam in New York City can be traced back to the 17th century, with the foundation of the New Amsterdam colony. The first Muslim settler could have been Dutch North African merchant Anthony Janszoon van Salee (known by contemporaries as Anthony the Turk). He is recorded as owning a Quran, which was supposedly auctioned off in the late 19th century.

It is possible that a small minority of enslaved West African and Madagascan Muslims lived in the city through to the 19th century, although evidence remains anecdotal and is based on assumptions around the names and regions of origin of various enslaved individuals.

=== Modern Muslims ===
==== Early Immigration ====
As with other parts of the United States, small-scale Muslim migration to New York began in the 1840s, with the arrival of Yemenis and Turks, as well as Bengali and Levantine sailors and merchants and lasted until World War I.

In 1907, Lipka Tatar immigrants from the Podlasie region of Poland founded the first Muslim organization in New York City, the American Mohammedan Society. In 1931 they founded the Powers Street Mosque in Williamsburg, making it the oldest continuously operating mosque in the city.

==== African-American Muslims ====
Following the Great Migration in the early 20th century, New York City emerged as a center of African-American Islam, in significant part through the Moorish Science Temple of America and the Nation of Islam.

In 1904, a Sudani imam by the name of Satti Majid travelled to New York, taking up caretaking duties for the small population of South Asian and Arab Muslims residing in the five boroughs. Imam Majid played an influential role introducing large parts of the city to mainstream Sunni Islam. One of these people was Shaikh Daoud Faisal, a Grenadian-born convert who helped found The International Muslim Society in Harlem, which linked African-American Muslims with their Somali, Yemeni, and South Asian co-religionists.

Shaikh Daoud would later set up The Islamic Mission of America in Brooklyn Heights in 1939. Known today as the State Street Mosque, or Masjid Dawood, the institution is the second-oldest operating mosque in the city.

New York was Malcolm X's base for several years, before his assassination in the Washington Heights section of Manhattan in 1965.

Following the death of Elijah Muhammad in 1975, the vast majority of Nation of Islam adherents in the city converted to mainstream Sunni Islam, guided by Imam Warith Deen Muhammad.

==== Immigration and Nationality Act of 1965 ====
The passing of the Hart-Celler Act in 1965 opened the way for a rapid growth of immigration into the United States from several Muslim-majority countries. Prior to this moment, immigration had been severely restricted by ethnic quotas. Beginning most notably during the 1970s, a wave of Muslims from Asia and Africa began arriving into New York City. The majority of current Muslim residents trace their history in the city to this wave.

==== 1980s to present ====
In the 1980s and 1990s, the city began receiving Muslim refugees from war-torn areas of the world, as well as green card lottery recipients from countries such as Bangladesh and the new Central Asian republics. Through skilled employment visas and family reunification programs, immigration also increased from countries such as Pakistan, Senegal, Ghana, Guyana, Egypt, Palestine, and Yemen. Most of these new immigrants settled in the outer boroughs, in neighborhoods such as Bay Ridge, Jackson Heights, Midwood, Astoria, Boerum Hill, and the West Bronx. Alongside other foreign-born residents, they would play a key role in reviving the city's fortunes following the crisis years of the 1970s. As of 2024, a significant new wave of Chinese Uyghur Muslims is fleeing religious persecution in northwestern China’s Xinjiang Province and seeking religious freedom in New York, concentrating in Queens.

==== Building community roots ====
With the arrival of new Muslim immigrants and the consolidation of the African-American Sunni community, Islam in New York began to flourish in the late 20th century. In the decades prior to 9/11 and the killing of Amadou Diallo in 1999, the city emerged as a destination for working Muslims around the globe, developing a reputation as a land of relative opportunity where faith could be freely practiced. Halal butchers and other Muslim-owned businesses began dotting the landscapes of the outer boroughs. The 1970s also saw the formal foundation of a wave of religious community organizations, including the Nigerian Muslim Association (Masjid Ibaadurahman) in Fort Greene and the Muslim Center of New York in Flushing, which was built by South Asian migrants and funded by Saudi Arabia.

Other mosques that date back to this period include:

- Masjid al-Abidin in Richmond Hill, founded by Indo-Guyanese Muslims in 1977
- Masjid al-Farah in Tribeca, founded by white American Sufi converts in 1983
- Masjid al Falah in Corona, the city's first purpose-built mosque built in 1983 by Haji Mohammed Abdul Alim Khan. Designed by a Korean engineer, it received an honorable mention from the Queens Chamber of Commerce for excellence in construction.
- Masjid al-Aman in East New York, founded by Bangladeshis in 1987
- PIEDAD, a Latin Muslim organisation founded by the Puerto Rican Muslim Khadijah Rivera in 1988
- The Imam al-Khoei Foundation in Jamaica, Queens, founded by Iranian Shias in 1989

As Muslim immigrant communities began to establish themselves in Europe and the US throughout the 1970s and 1980s, they began appearing on the radar of governments across the Arab world such as Kuwait and Saudi Arabia. Keen to exert influence over these groups and to take advantage of their location at the centre of global political and economic power, many of these governments turned their attention to urban mega-mosque projects, such as London's Regent's Park Mosque. In New York, these energies coalesced around the idea to build a new site for the city's Islamic Cultural Center, which had originally been founded on the Upper West Side in the early 1960s by a group of Muslim ambassadors to the United Nations. These plans eventually resulted in the construction of the Islamic Cultural Center in 1987 on Manhattan's East Side. The Center became Manhattan's first purpose-built mosque and, as intended by its original trustees, a New York City architectural landmark, a symbolic testament to the presence of Muslims across the city.

=== 21st century ===
==== Islam after 9/11 ====
The September 11 attacks were a defining moment for New York's Muslims, and led to a wave of backlash against residents deemed to be Muslim. Following the launch of the war on terror, Muslims across the city came under suspicion by individuals and the government alike. The INS Special Registration System, which required that noncitizen adult men from 24 Muslim-majority countries register with the newly formed Immigration and Customs Enforcement (ICE) agency, had a noted impact on the city's Muslim communities. It is estimated that up to 20,000 Muslims fled Brooklyn alone during this period, as a result of FBI raids and widespread fear around deportation and religious persecution.

In 2002, the NYPD's Intelligence Bureau began surveilling Muslim communities across the New York metro area, recruiting informants to spy on mosques and Muslim student groups. The NYPD focused specifically on Muslim institutions and neighborhoods, notably excluding from its scope the activities of Iranian Jews and Egyptian Copts. The program was denounced as unconstitutional and declared illegal in court, with the police department settling the lawsuit paying $72,500 in damages.

==== The post-2016 era ====
The election of Donald Trump in 2016 marked the beginning of another difficult chapter for Islam in the city, with state-sanctioned nativism targeting Muslims in particular. In 2016, in the midst of Trump's election campaign, a Bangladeshi imam and his assistant were shot dead in the Ozone Park section of Queens. Although a motive was never uncovered, some congregants blamed the presidential candidate for cultivating a climate of anti-Muslim hatred. According to the Muslim Community Network, more than 26% of black Muslims and approximately 32% of Asian Muslims have experienced or witnessed hate crimes in 2023 in New York city.

In January 2017, following the signing of Executive Order 13769 (commonly known as the Muslim Ban), thousands of protesters of all faiths convened at John F. Kennedy Airport in Queens, setting off a national protest movement in solidarity with Muslims across the country. Members of the New York Taxi Workers' Alliance, a predominantly Muslim taxi worker union, went on strike at the airport and refused to pick up passengers.

New York's Muslims have responded to these challenges in a variety of ways, from filing lawsuits against the police and forming community patrols, to focusing on business and running for political office. Among this latter category include a handful of progressive Muslim politicians, most notably New York Mayor Zohran Mamdani and City Councillor Shahana Hanif.

In recent years, New York's Muslim population has continued to grow in numbers and visibility, with ongoing streams of international migrants joined by a new wave of second generation students, professionals and creatives from other parts of the US. The growth of this latter group has accompanied a new set of institutions and consumption patterns, including music venues, Yemeni coffee shops, and alternative religious spaces. As a result, Muslim New York is no longer solely the domain of immigrant workers and small business owners, but more broadly represents the class distribution of the city at large.

In 2024, Assemblyman Zohran Mamdani announced that he would be running for mayor in the Democratic primary on a left-wing platform of ambitious social policies. Through mosque visits, mass canvassing, and community outreach, Mamdani made Muslim voters a priority demographic for his campaign and centered his Muslim background at several points. Mamdani's attempt to cohere a Muslim electoral bloc largely succeeded, with his eventual victory in the 2025 Democratic mayoral primary counting on large-scale turnout in a number of Muslim-populated districts. Throughout the campaign, and in the wake of his victory, Mamdani faced a significant Islamophobic backlash. That November, Mamdani was elected as the first Muslim and first Indian American mayor of New York City.

== Demographics ==
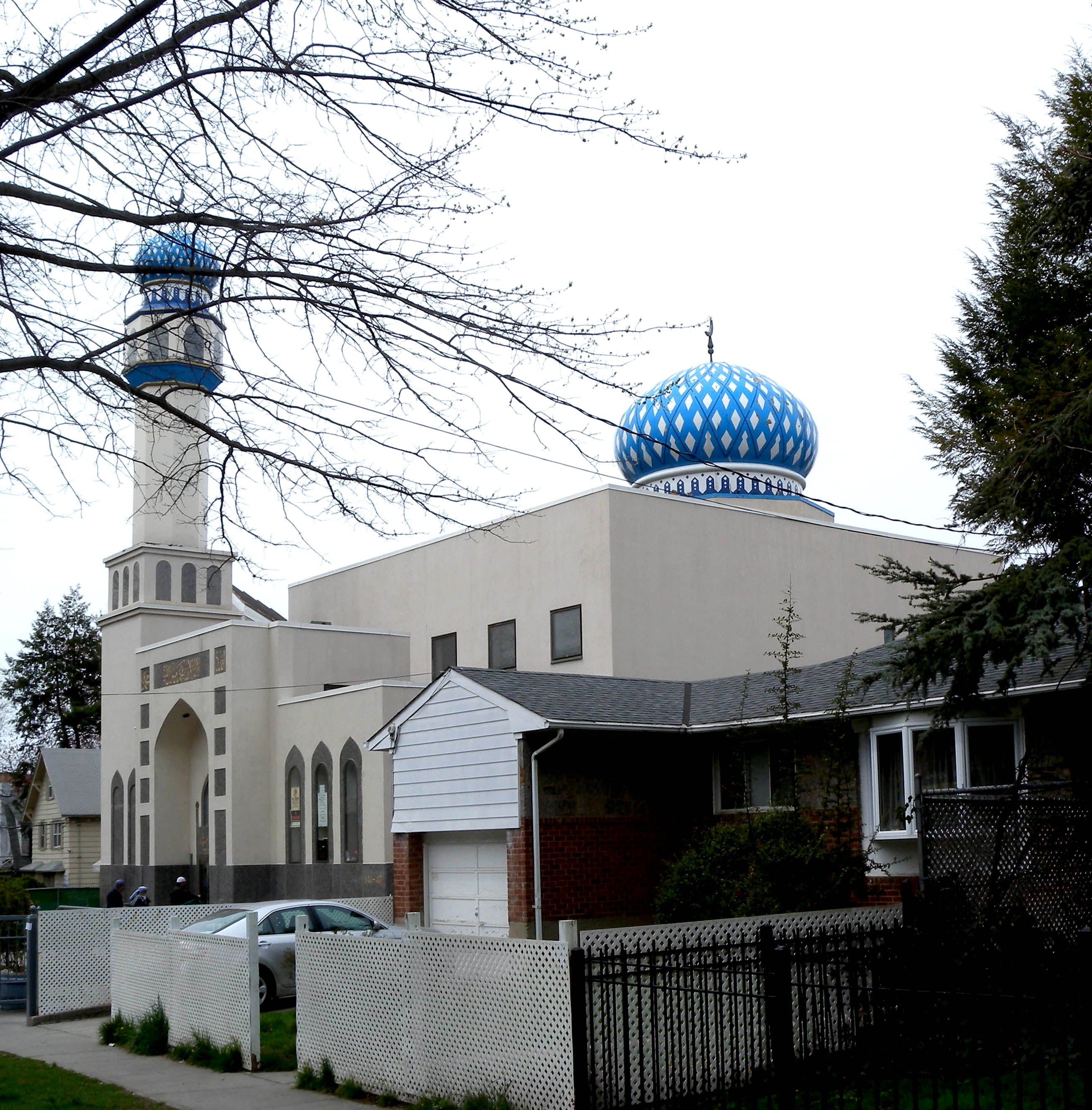
Mosque in Queens, New York City with classical dome architecture

The ethnic background of New York City's Muslims reflects the diversity of the city at large. No other large city in the world contains such a well-proportioned split of Muslims by region of origin. The largest groups are South Asians, followed by African-Americans and West Africans. Other large communities include North Africans, Caribbean people, West Asians, Balkan Europeans, and Central Asians.

As across the world at large, Sunnis form a majority among the city's Muslims, representing a range of madhahib. However significant communities of Shia Muslims also call the city home. Various Shia mosques can be found across the outer boroughs, and an annual Ashura procession has taken place in Manhattan since the mid-1980s.

== Notable mosques and other institutions ==
The New York metropolitan area is home to 275 mosques, more than anywhere else in the country. Notable mosques in the New York metropolitan region include the Islamic Cultural Center of New York, Masjid Malcolm Shabbaz, and the Islamic Center of Passaic County in Paterson, New Jersey.

In 2023, Mayor Eric Adams announced new rules allowing mosques in the city to broadcast the adhan on Fridays, and at sundown during the holy month of Ramadan.

== Islam elsewhere in the New York metropolitan area ==
Paterson, New Jersey, in the New York metropolitan area west of New York City, was estimated to have become home to 25,000 to 30,000 Muslims as of 2011. Paterson has been nicknamed Little Ramallah and contains a neighborhood with the same name and an Arab American population estimated as high as 20,000 in 2015.

=== Little Istanbul ===
"Little Istanbul" (Turkish: Küçük İstanbul) is an area of South Paterson centered on Main Street. This rapidly growing Turkish American enclave is the largest in the United States in addition to housing many Palestinians, Lebanese, Syrians, Jordanians, and Arab immigrants from a variety of other countries. Paterson is home to the largest Turkish-American immigrant community in the United States (Little Istanbul) and the second largest Arab-American community after Dearborn, Michigan. Therefore, it also called "Little Ramallah" (Arabic: رام الله الصغيرة Rām Allāh al-Ṣaḡīra). The Paterson-based Arab American Civic Association runs an Arabic language program in the Paterson school district. Paterson's Arab American population was estimated as high as 20,000 in 2015.

The area is also part of Lakeview, which lies to the east of East Railroad Avenue. The area is bounded on the south by Clifton, on the west by NJ 19 and on the north by I-80. There are many Middle Eastern restaurants, grocery stores and stores in the area. Main Street has the largest concentration of these, but there are other Turkish and Arab stores and restaurants throughout the area. The area is mostly residential with commercial zoning along Main Street.

=== Little Bangladesh ===
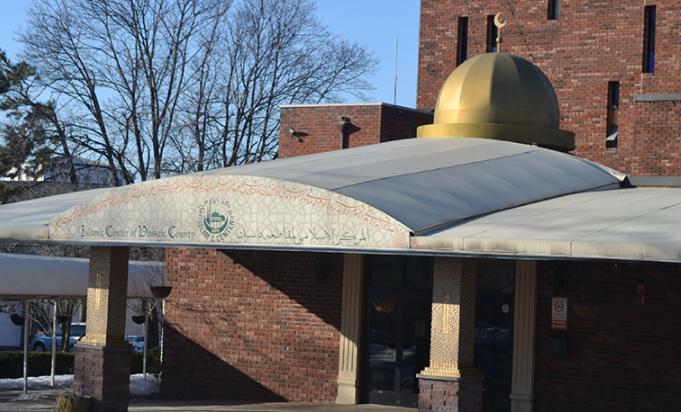
The Islamic Center of Passaic County in Paterson, New Jersey, in the New York City metropolitan area. Paterson is home to the second largest Bangladeshi American population, after New York City.

Paterson, New Jersey, is home to a significant and growing Bangladeshi American community. Many Bangladeshi grocery stores and clothing stores are locating in the emerging Little Bangladesh on Union Avenue and the surrounding streets in Paterson, as well as a branch of the Sonali Exchange Company Inc., a subsidiary of Sonali Bank, the largest state-owned financial institution in Bangladesh. Masjid Al-Ferdous is also located on Union Avenue, which accommodates Paterson's rapidly growing Bangladeshi pedestrian population in Paterson.

Mohammed Akhtaruzzaman was ultimately certified as the winner of the 2012 city council race in the Second Ward, making him northern New Jersey's first Bangladeshi-American elected official. The current 2nd Ward Councilman is Bangladeshi Shahin Khalique, who defeated Akhtaruzzaman in 2016 as well as in 2020.

On 11 October 2014, the groundbreaking ceremony for the Shaheed Minar Monument in West Side Park in Paterson took place. The monument pays tribute to people killed in Pakistan in 1952 while protesting that country's policies that banned Bangladeshis from speaking their Bangla language, and replicates similar monuments in Bangladesh, according to the World Glam Organization, the Bangladeshi cultural group working on the Paterson project. The Shohid Minar was completed and unveiled in 2015. This project reflected the increasing influence of Paterson's growing Bangladeshi community, as reported in The Record.

== Muslim funeral practices ==
In Islam, funeral practices center around simplicity, dignity, and prayer. Muslim funerals typically consist of a short congressional prayer that is performed at a mosque or outside before the burial takes place. The body is often buried before 24 hours, and also placed in the coffin on their right side facing Mecca. Coffins are not elaborate and decorations are also not encouraged to emphasize humility and equality. Moreso, these simple burials are meant to highlight the spiritual belief in the afterlife.

Muslim communities in NYC have begun facing serious challenges in securing cemetery space that follows Islamic standards. New York has no Muslim-only cemetery, so burials instead take place in Washington Memorial Park Cemetery in Long Island or in New Jersey.

Given NYC's large Muslim population and the importance of Muslim funeral practices to Muslim communities, there is a need for funeral homes that specialize in Islamic burial tractions. In New York City, there are many enclaves of Muslim New Yorkers, from Little Pakistan in Brooklyn to Harlem in Manhattan.

== Notable people ==
- Khalid Khannouchi, former marathon world record holder
- Louis Farrakhan, head of Nation of Islam
- Malcolm X, revolutionary and Black nationalist leader
- Mike Tyson, former professional boxer
- Yasiin Bey, rapper, singer, and actor
- Zohran Mamdani, first Muslim mayor of New York City

== See also ==
- Religion in New York City
