= Noble Drew Ali =

American religious leader (1886–1929)

Drew Ali
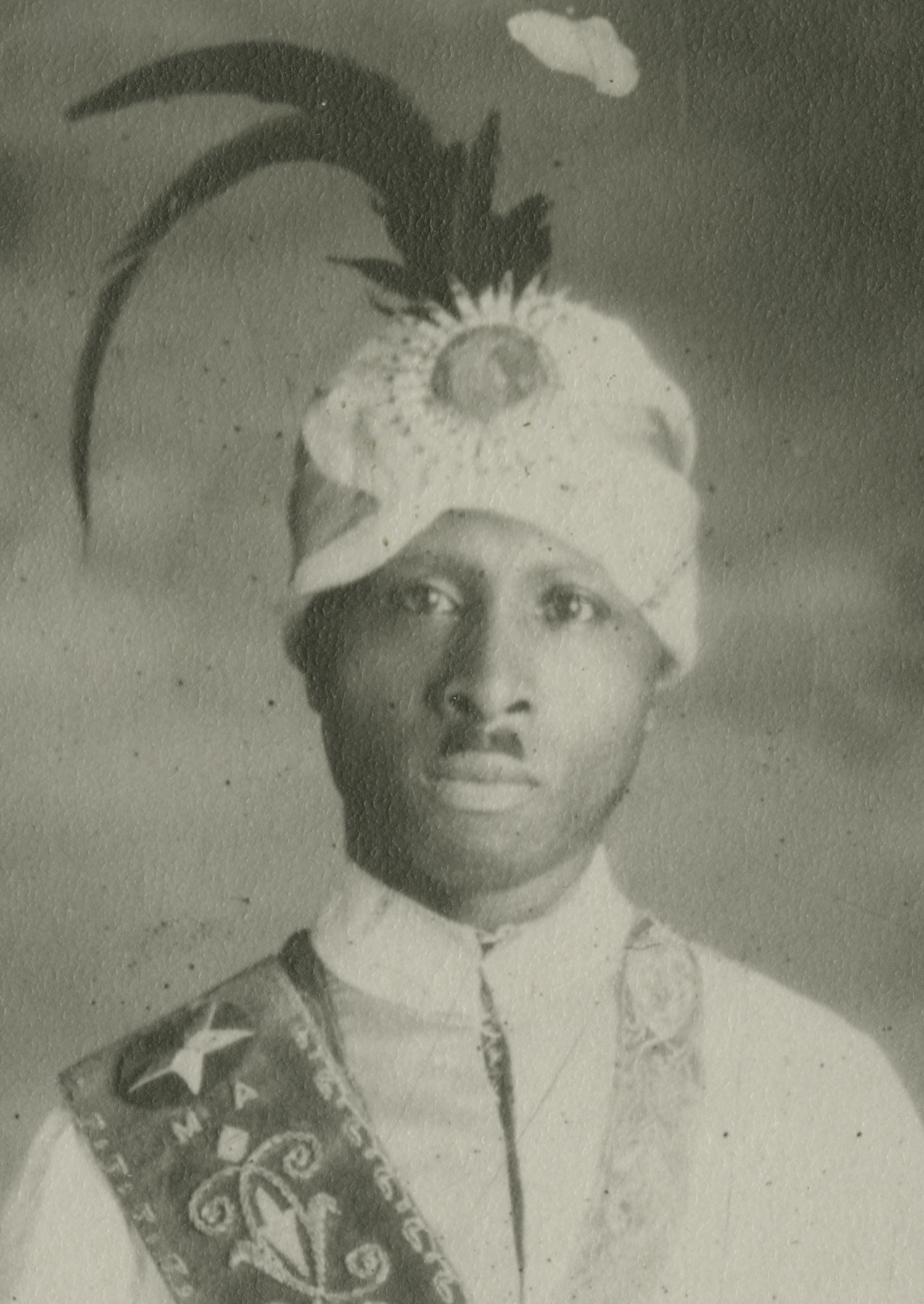
- Drew Ali in 1925
- Born: Timothy Drew; January 8, 1886; North Carolina, United States
- Died: July 20, 1929 (aged 43); Chicago, Illinois, United States
- Cause of death: Tuberculosis and bronchopneumonia
- Resting place: Burr Oak Cemetery
- Spouse(s): Pearl Drew Ali & Mary Drew Ali

Noble Drew Ali (January 8, 1886 – July 20, 1929; possibly born Timothy or Thomas Drew) was an American civil and religious leader who, in the early 20th century, founded a series of organizations that he ultimately placed under the umbrella title, the Moorish Divine and National Movement of the World; including the Canaanite Temple (1913–1916), the Moorish Holy Temple of Science (1925–1928), and the Moorish Science Temple of America (1928 onwards). Considered a Surah An-Nahl style prophet by his followers, he founded the Canaanite Temple in 1913 while living in Newark, New Jersey. From there, he made his way westward and eventually settled in Chicago between 1922 and 1925. Upon reaching Chicago, his movement would gain thousands of converts under his instruction. Upon the murder of a rival Moorish Science Temple leader, Drew Ali was arrested (but never charged) and sent to jail; he died on July 20, 1929, shortly after being released.

It is traditionally held that Drew Ali founded the first officially state-registered Islamic organization in U.S. history, and was the first American-born Islamic religious leader. Although the Moorish Science Temple of America has largely declined, Drew Ali's legacy is significant because of its influence on the founding and ideology of the Nation of Islam.

== Early life ==
Several details of Drew Ali's early life are uncertain, as true information became mixed with that of legend by his devout followers. He is believed to have been born Timothy Drew, on January 8, 1886, in North Carolina. Sources differ as to his background and upbringing: one reports he was the orphaned son of two former slaves, his early followers believed he was raised by Cherokee. Another describes him as the son of a Moroccan Muslim father and a Cherokee mother.

One version of his life, common among Moorish Science Temple of America members, holds that Drew was raised by an abusive aunt, who once threw him into a furnace. This version holds that he left home at 16 and joined a band of Romani people who took him overseas to Egypt, and the Middle East. Drew Ali worked as a merchant seaman before founding the Canaanite Temple in 1913. He never received a formal education, but at some point came into contact with Eastern philosophy.

In 2014, a new understanding of Drew Ali's early life was presented with the publication of an article in the online Journal of Race Ethnicity and Religion. The article presented newly compiled evidence, including census records, newspaper ads, newspaper articles, a World War I draft card, and street directory records, to link Noble Drew Ali to one "Thomas Drew," who was born on the same date as "Timothy Drew" but census registered as 'from' Virginia instead of North Carolina.

== Religious formation ==
Drew Ali reported that during his travels in Egypt, he met a high priest of Egyptian magic. In one version of Drew Ali's biography, the leader saw him as a reincarnation of the founder. In others, he claims that the priest considered him a reincarnation of Jesus, the Buddha, Muhammad and other religious prophets. According to the biography, the high priest trained Ali in mysticism and gave him a "lost section" of the Quran.

Noble Drew Ali's central religious text, listed by the Library of Congress as called The Holy Koran of the Moorish Science Temple of America : [circle] 7 It alternatively came to be nicknamed the "Circle Seven Koran" because of its cover, which features a red "7" surrounded by a blue circle.

The first 19 chapters are from The Aquarian Gospel of Jesus the Christ, published in 1908 by esoteric Ohio preacher Levi Dowling. In The Aquarian Gospel, Dowling described Jesus's supposed travels in India, Egypt, and Palestine during the years of his life which are not accounted for by the New Testament. Chapters 20 through 44 are borrowed from the Rosicrucian work, Unto Thee I Grant, with minor changes in style and wording. They are instructions on how to live, and the education and duties of adherents.

Drew Ali wrote the last four chapters of the Circle Seven Koran himself. In these he wrote:

The fallen sons and daughters of the Asiatic Nation of North America need to learn to love instead of hate; and to know of their higher self and lower self. This is the uniting of the Holy Koran of Mecca for teaching and instructing all Moorish Americans, etc. The key of civilization was and is in the hands of the Asiatic nations. The Moorish, who were the ancient Moabites, and the founders of the Holy City of Mecca.

Drew Ali used this material to claim Jesus and his followers were Asiatic. ("Asiatic" was the term Drew Ali used for all dark or olive-skinned people); he labeled whites as European, although he labeled whites who became a part of the MSTA as "Persians" or "Celts". He suggested that all Asiatics should be allied.

Drew Ali believed that African Americans were all Moors, who he claimed were descended from the ancient Moabites (describing them as belonging to Northwest Africa as opposed to Moab as the name suggests). He claimed that Islam and its teachings are more beneficial to their earthly salvation, and that their 'true nature' had been 'withheld' from them. Male members of the Temple wear a fez or turban as head covering; women wear a turban.

As Drew Ali began urging the "Moorish-Americans" to become better citizens, he made speeches like, "A Divine Warning By the Prophet for the Nations", in which he urged them to reject derogatory labels, such as "Black," "colored," and "Negro." He urged Americans of all races to reject hate and embrace love. He believed that Chicago would become a second Mecca.

Drew Ali crafted Moorish Science ideology from a variety of sources, a "network of alternative spiritualities that focused on the power of the individual to bring about personal transformation through mystical knowledge of the divine within". In the interwar period in Chicago and other major cities, he used these concepts to preach Moorish pride. His approach appealed to thousands of African Americans who had left severely oppressive conditions in the South through the Great Migration and faced struggles adapting in new urban environments.

== Satti Majid ==
Satti Majid viewed Ali as part of an attempt to spread sceptical views about the finality of Prophet Muhammad's message. This is because prophet Muhammad is known as the Seal of the Prophets to Muslims. Satti Majid was especially concerned about Noble Drew Ali's claims of being a prophet and his creation of a book named Circle Seven Koran. In response, Satti asked Ali to change his name and burn his Koran. Satti Majid also accused Ali of departing from Islam.

Satti Majid departed the United States on 13 January 1929, (Note: or 31 January 1929 with Satti Majid going to Alexandria from New York) and upon reaching Cairo, he aimed to secure a fatwa against Noble Drew Ali from Al-Azhar Al-Sharif. Al-Azhar issued a fatwa in Arabic along with an English translation branding Drew Ali as an "imposter and disbeliever." Satti Majid also garnered support for the fatwa from religious scholars in Sudan. However, there's no evidence that the fatwa reached the United States before Noble Drew Ali's death on 20 July 1929.

Satti Majid seemingly intended to use this official condemnation of Drew Ali upon his return to the US, intending it as a tool to attract followers among other Muslim leaders. He tried to raise funds for his return and requested al-Azhar's official recognition as a missionary to the US. Yet, in 1934, his request was denied by al-Azhar, which cited his lack of the required scholarly qualifications for the role. Thus, instead of going back to the United States, Satti Majid split his time during the 1930s between Egypt and Sudan.

== Founding the Moorish Science Temple ==
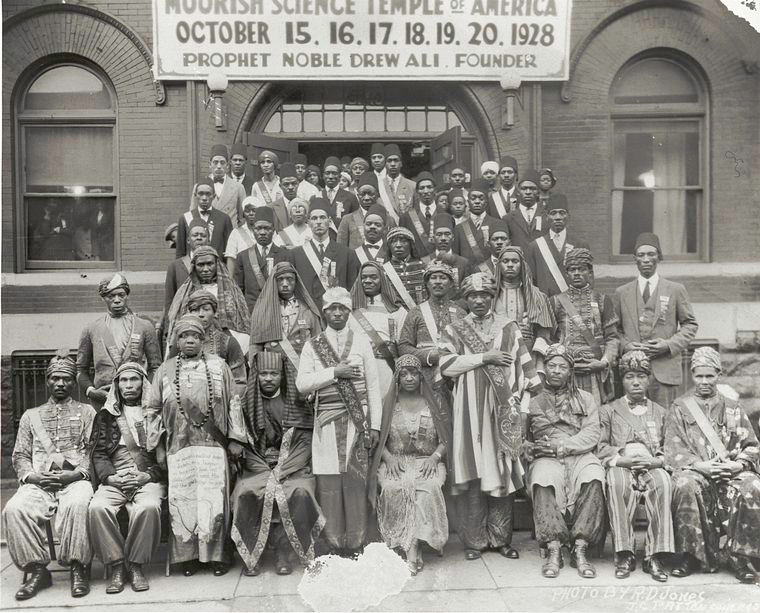
Attendees of the 1928 Moorish Science Temple Conclave in Chicago. Noble Drew Ali is in white in the front row center.

It is possible that Drew Ali did actually travel to Egypt and Morocco, but historians believe that after leaving North Carolina, he moved to Newark, New Jersey, where he worked as a train expressman. According to MST tradition, in 1913, Drew Ali formed the Canaanite Temple in Newark. He left the city after agitating people with his views on race. Drew Ali and his followers migrated, while planting congregations in Philadelphia; Washington, D.C., and Detroit. Finally, Drew Ali settled in Chicago in 1925, saying the Midwest was "closer to Islam." The following year he officially registered Temple No. 9.

There he instructed followers not to be confrontational but to build up their people to be respected. In this way, they might take their place in the United States of America by developing a cultural identity that was congruent with Drew Ali's beliefs on personhood. In the late 1920s, journalists estimated the Moorish Science Temple had 35,000 members in 17 temples in cities across the Midwest and upper South.

The ushers of the Temple wore black fezzes. The leader of a particular temple was known as a Grand Sheik, or Governor. Noble Drew Ali was known to have had several wives. According to The Chicago Defender, he claimed the power to marry and divorce at will. The Moorish Science movement was reportedly studied and watched by the Chicago police.

Drew Ali attended the 1929 inauguration of Illinois Governor Louis Lincoln Emmerson. The Chicago Defender stated that his trip included "interviews with many distinguished citizens from Chicago, who greeted him on every hand." With the growth in its population and membership, Chicago was established as the center of the Moorish Science movement.

=== Internal split and murder ===
In early 1929, following a conflict over funds, Claude Green-Bey, the business manager of Chicago Temple No. 1 split from the Moorish Science Temple of America. He declared himself Grand Sheik and took a number of members with him. On March 15, Green-Bey was stabbed to death at the Unity Hall of the Moorish Science Temple, on Indiana Avenue in Chicago.

Drew Ali was out of town at the time, as he was dealing with former Supreme Grand Governor Lomax-Bey (professor Ezaldine Muhammad), who had supported Green-Bey's attempted coup. When Drew Ali returned to Chicago, the police arrested him and other members of the community on suspicion of having instigated the killing. No indictment was sworn for Drew Ali at that time.

== Death ==
Shortly after his release by the police, Drew Ali died at age 43 at his home in Chicago on July 20, 1929. Although the exact circumstances of his death are unknown, the Certificate of Death stated that Noble Drew Ali died from "tuberculosis broncho-pneumonia". Despite the official report, many of his followers speculated that his death was caused by injuries from the police or from other members of the faith.

Others thought it was due to pneumonia. One Moor told The Chicago Defender that "The Prophet was not ill; his work was done and he laid his head upon the lap of one of his followers and passed out." His funeral took place on July 25, 1929, with hundreds attending. The services were held at the Pythian Temple in Chicago, followed by the burial at Burr Oak Cemetery in nearby Alsip.

The death of Drew Ali brought out a number of candidates who vied to succeed him. Edward Mealy El stated that he had been declared Drew Ali's successor by Drew Ali himself, while John Givens-El, Drew Ali's chauffeur, declared that he was Drew Ali reincarnated. However, the governors of the Moorish Science Temple of America declared Charles Kirkman-Bey to be the successor to Drew Ali and named him Grand Advisor.

== Legacy ==
Wallace Fard Muhammad, the founder of Nation of Islam, may have been a prominent member of the Moorish Science Temple of America, where he was known as David Ford-El; however, due to his obfuscated and poorly-documented history, this is disputed by scholars. After Drew Ali's death, he claimed to be the Prophet reincarnated.

When his leadership was largely rejected, he broke away from the Moorish Science Temple, moved to Detroit, and founded the Nation of Islam. Nation of Islam leaders denied any historical connection to the Moorish Science Temple of America, until February 26, 2014, when Louis Farrakhan acknowledged Noble Drew Ali's contribution to the Nation of Islam.

In 1986, the Moroccan Ambassador to the United States officially recognized the Moorish Science Temple's Islamic linkage to Morocco through Drew Ali.

== See also ==
- Islam in the United States
- Liberation theology
- Malcolm X
- Elijah Muhammad
- Religion of black Americans
