= E. Mealy El =

American religious leader (1870–1935)

Sheikh E. Mealy El
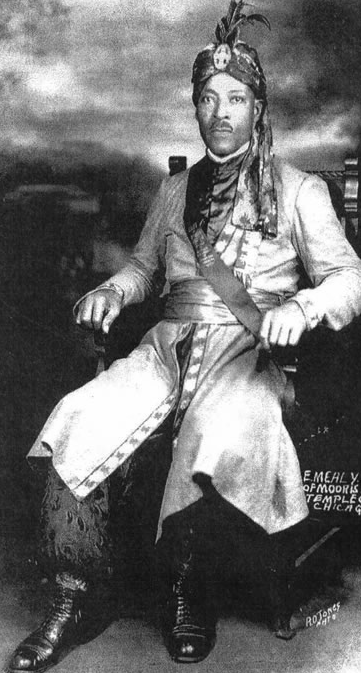
- Mealy El, circa 1928.

1st Grand Sheik of the Moorish Science Temple of America (Mealy El faction)
- Appointed by: Noble Drew Ali
- Preceded by: Position established

Personal details
- Born: Edward Mealy; September 17, 1870 Wilkerson, Mississippi, United States
- Died: 1935 (aged 64–65)
- Spouse: Dealia Mealy El

Edward Mealy El (born Edward Mealy; September 17, 1870 – 1935), often known as E. Mealy El, was an American religious leader who was Prophet Noble Drew Ali's successor as head of the Moorish Science Temple of America. He was appointed as the first Assistant Chairman of the Moorish Science Temple of America, Incorporated by the Prophet Noble Drew Ali on June 1, 1927. On August 1, of the same year he received an appointment to General Chairman from the Prophet Drew Ali. In February 1928, Mealy El was appointed Grand Sheik and Chairman of the Moorish Science Temple of America by the Prophet Noble Drew Ali. By the close of the first annual convention of the Moorish Science Temple of America (October 15–20) Edward Mealy El was promoted to Supreme Grand Sheik of the organization's highest tribunal and executive cabinet, the Supreme Grand Council. In all his appointments, he was unanimously approved by the "Grand Body", or, executive heads of all subordinate temples within the Moorish Science Temple of America. In February 1929, an annual corporation report filed with the Illinois Secretary of State lists Edward Mealy El as President of the Moorish Science Temple of America Inc.

Upon Drew Ali's death on July 20, 1929, Mr. Mealy El continued to run the organization. Edward Mealy died in 1935.

== Early life ==
Edward Mealy was born on September 17, 1870, in Wilkerson, Mississippi, which was renamed Huntington and later abandoned.

== Moorish Science ==
Mealy El moved to Chicago, Illinois, and became involved with Noble Drew Ali's Moorish-American Islamic religious movement, the Moorish Science Temple of America Incorporated. He became the Governor (pastor) of Chicago's Grand Major Temple No. 1.

=== Noble Drew Ali's death and succession controversy ===
Prophet Noble Drew Ali died on July 20, 1929, and his attorney, Aaron Payne Ali, tried to unite the Moorish Science movement under his leadership. He was unsuccessful, and several of Drew Ali's former disciples emerged to vie for power amidst the leadership vacuum. Mealy El stated that he had been declared Drew Ali's successor by the Prophet himself. In August, John Givens El, Drew Ali's chauffeur, declared that he was Drew Ali reincarnated. He is said to have fainted while working on Drew Ali's automobile and "the sign of the star and crescent [appeared] in his eyes".

Mealy El was present at the Second Annual National Convention of the Moorish Science Temple of America, or "Unity Conference," in September 1929. As the end of the convention neared, hours were spent discussing the Prophet's intentions. Around this time, John Givens El entered the chamber and sat himself on the Prophet's empty seat. He announced:

I am back. I am the Prophet Noble Drew Ali, reincarnated, and Prophet Noble Drew Ali, the founder. We two are one in [sic] the same.

A silence fell over the convention chamber. Despite this, the convention delegates did not vote for Givens El to lead the Moorish Science Temple of America. Instead, with two-thirds of the votes, the grand sheikhs elected Mealy El as the first Supreme Grand Sheikh and C. Kirkman Bey as his Grand Advisor. Ultimately, the election was not accepted by all members, and both Givens El and Kirkman Bey went on to lead their own factions of the Moorish Science Temple. Kirkman Bey took Mealy El to court to try to gain legal leadership over the denomination, but lost each time. On My 7, 1931, Judge Eberhart ruled in his favor in the case of C. Kirkman vs. E. Mealy El. In response, Kirkman Bey created his own organization, called the "Moorish Science Temple of America, Inc," taking most of the Moors with him.

By then, Mealy El only retained leadership over Temple No. 1 in Chicago, but possessed Drew Ali's original documents. Several years after the leadership feud, Mealy El suffered a stroke and was sent to live with his family in Mississippi by his wife, Dealia, who was unable to care for him. He died in late 1935 while on a business trip, no longer living in Chicago due to infighting. Following his death, Dealia Mealy El inherited Noble Drew's papers and used them to place, William Morris El, who she was rumored to have started a relationship with after her husband's death, in the position of Supreme Grand Sheikh. Over time, his leadership was rejected by many of the members of Temple No. 1. In response, some of them turned Noble Drew Ali's documents over to Charles Kirkman Bey, thus strengthening his legitimacy as Noble Drew Ali's successor.
