= Satti Majid =

Sudanese Islamic leader (1883–1967)

Imam Satti Majid
- ساتي ماجد
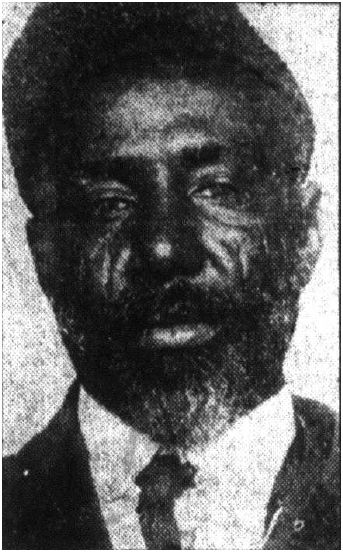
- Satti Majid in 1925

Personal life
- Born: Satti Majid Muhammad al-Qadi Suwar al-Dhahab; 1883 Al-Ghaddar village, Old Dongola, Turco-Egyptian Sudan
- Died: 17 March 1963 (aged 79–80) Al-Ghaddar, Northern State, Sudan
- Region: US
- Main interest: Islamic missionary
- Education: Al-Azhar University (no degree)
- Posthumous name: Shaykh al-Islam in North America; Shaykh of Buffalo; Shaykh of America

Religious life
- Religion: Sunni Islam
- Lineage: Suwar al-Dhahab (Danagla)

Senior posting
- Influenced: Elijah Muhammad Daoud Faisal Malcolm X

Imam Satti Majid (Arabic: ساتي ماجد; 1883 – 17 March 1963), also known as Shaykh al-Islam in North America, was a Sudanese Islamic leader who is considered as one of the first Muslim missionaries in the United States and known for establishing Islam as an organised religion in the United States during the interwar period. Satti Majid Muhammad al-Qadi Suwar al-Dhahab was from a Dongolawi family of religious judges and clerics. He studied Islam in a khalwa, then pursued education at al-Azhar University in Egypt. With intentions to spread Islam, he moved to England, where he co-founded the Islamic Missionary Society with fellow Dongolawi and Yemeni men, delivering speeches and lectures across Britain, where he used his knowledge in Quran and Hadith while his associates translated to English.

Satti Majid's influence extended to the United States, where he settled in the Yemeni community in Brooklyn, New York, and became an imam around 1904. He played a crucial role in organising Sudanese expatriates and formed national associations. His impact stretched from New York to Detroit, establishing organisations like the United Moslem Society and the African Moslem Welfare Society of America, aimed at promoting Islamic identity and community coordination.

An orthodox (Sunni) Muslim, Satti Majid had a dispute with the Ahmadiyya movement, and in 1929 he attempted to condemn Noble Drew Ali's teachings with Al-Azhar's support but was not able to return to the US from Egypt. He later returned to Sudan, engaged in Islamic conventions, and founded the Islamic Unity Association.

Satti Majid's efforts to convert African Americans to Islam were recognised and celebrated, and he left a lasting impact on American Islam, emphasising unity, education, and community building. His influence on figures like Shaykh Daoud Ahmed Faisal and Elijah Muhammad, and his indirect impact on Malcolm X reshaped American Muslim history.

== Biography ==
=== Early life ===
Satti Majid Muhammad al-Qadi Suwar al-Dhahab was born in 1883 in al-Ghaddar village in Old Dongola, Turco-Egyptian Sudan. He belonged to Suwar al-Dhahab family, a family of religious judges and clerics, that is part to the Danagla people. (Note: Zubaid section of the Bedaria tribe) In the Dongolawi language, "Satti" means "the poor". However, it has also come to be associated with "the reciters of the Qur'an."

Satti Majid pursued Islamic studies under local shaykhs, aligning with family tradition. He began his education at the khalwa of Shaykh Awad at al-Ghaddar, then he continued his education in memorising the Qur'an and studying the principles of jurisprudence in the khalwa of Shaykh Ahmed Wedidi in the village of Romi al-Backry, few miles from al-Ghaddar. With a desire to study at al-Azhar University, he left Sudan for Egypt in 1893 but he did not complete his studies there. He emigrated to Egypt in the era of the Mahdist state (1885–1899).

=== Departure from Sudan (early 1900s – 1920s) ===
According to Abu Shouk et al., Majid's departure from Sudan was likely to counter perceived anti-Islamic sentiments in the west, and engage with a broader Islamic community beyond his homeland. After reaching England, he was greeted by a fellow Dongolawi and a Yemeni. Together, they founded an Islamic missionary society, and embarked on establishing a religious initiative, in which he assumed the role of leader and guide. They spread their message through extensive preaching and talks across the British Isles. While Satti Majid spoke in Arabic, his two associates provided English translations. Additionally, he excelled at substantiating his points using references from the Quran and the Hadith, the recorded teachings of Prophet Muhammad.

From Britain, Satti Majid proceeded to New York, driven to spread Islam. According to historian Patrick D. Bowen, details of his early US years are scarce and occasionally inconsistent. (Note: Bowen and Abu Shouk note it was circulated, especially by Ahmed Abdalhalim Mohamed, that Satti Majid 's journey to the US was driven by his mission to combat islamophobia, sparked by derogatory writings about Islam by an Italian priest in the New York Times. This led to a publicised debate, where Satti Majid aimed to defend Islam. After the debate, Satti Majid was stabbed by an assailant, yet forgave him, leaving a "profound impact". This incident played a role in converting numerous individuals to Islam. Both scholars did not find any evidence, including not finding articles in the New York Times, to support this claim.) Despite claiming arrival in 1912 or 1915, a passenger coupon suggests 1904 entry via New Orleans. Upon his arrival in New York, he was aided by Turkish embassy to integrate into the Brooklyn's Yemeni community. In that community he became the imam. As a community organiser, he aided Sudanese compatriots and formed a nationwide association for their progress. Collaborating with leaders like Shaykh Mehmed Ali, he aimed to replicate their strategies. His post-World War I efforts included aiding overseas Muslims and facilitating burial plot purchases.

Satti Majid established connections with foreign Muslims along the East Coast in the early 20th century. Notably, he associated with Shaykh Mehmed Ali, the imam of the Ottoman Embassy's mosque in Washington, D.C., among the first public mosques in the United States. The Ottoman consulate began supporting an apartment on Manhattan's 17 Rector Street in 1910, known as the "Oriental," where Muslims and Asian immigrants resided and traded goods since the 1890s. Shaykh Mehmed's influence led local Muslims to adhere more closely to Islamic practices, with up to a hundred visiting the Manhattan mosque for prayers. He held sway beyond New York, guiding Muslims in Boston, Lowell, Worcester, and Providence.

Inspired by Shaykh Mehmed's success, Satti Majid emulated his methods upon arriving in Detroit around 1912, establishing organisations like the Islamic Benevolence Society. During World War I, he aided overseas Muslims and arranged the purchase of Muslim burial plots in 1920, while leading a Detroit chapter of the Red Crescent Society.

While striving for prominence in Detroit, he also worked to build his influence in New York. By 1921, he had established an office near the Rector Street mosque, advocating for financial aid for Muslim seamen in the city. Notably, he gained recognition among the Sudanese community in New York. Simultaneously, he continued his work in Detroit and established the Moslem Welfare Society in 1922, partly motivated by addressing criticisms of Islam.

Amid tensions within Detroit's Muslim community, Satti Majid's clash with the Ahmadiyya movement emerged. This movement sought to convert African Americans to Islam, leading to disputes over religious practices. Patrick D. Bowen asserts that Satti Majid's actions reflected his endeavour to safeguard his interpretation of Sunni Islam, a manifestation of institutionalised religion in the United States. Amid these endeavours, Bowen believes that Satti Majid made exaggerated claims about his conversions as he sought to build his reputation as a community leader.

=== Buffalo (late 1920s) ===
Muslim immigrants from diverse backgrounds arrived in Buffalo, New York, in the early 20th century, attracting Satti Majid's attention as he sought out emerging Muslim communities in need of religious leadership. Around 1922, Buffalo's Muslims congregated at a Muslim-owned coffeehouse on Seneca Street, where Satti Majid also resided from approximately 1924 to 1927. His residence made him a central figure in Buffalo's community.

From this location, Satti Majid successfully organised the Buffalo Moslem Welfare Society in 1924, attracting hundreds of members and holding meetings across various sections of the city. He not only managed the financial aspects of the society but also supported immigrant Muslims by acting as an interpreter in courts, facilitating English language learning, and addressing employment-related issues. He emphasised that it was possible to be both a devout Muslim and a patriot American, while working to secure Islamic reading materials and a mosque.

Satti Majid's influence as a religious leader was challenged by Achmed Ali, another influential Imam in Buffalo, resulting in a case where Ali threatened Satti Majid's life resulting on the later being sentenced to six months. Despite internal tensions within the Muslim community, Satti Majid establishing the United Moslem Society (UMS) as an umbrella organisation for local benevolence societies. According to Patrick D. Bowen, although Satti Majid's claims of UMS role in the community were exaggerated, its founding marked an important step in the history of Islam in the United States, illustrating efforts by immigrant and foreign Muslims to establish national organisations well before the 1950s. The UMS reflected a growing sense of American Muslim identity and community coordination during the interwar period.

In 1927, Satti Majid co-found the African Moslem Welfare Society of America (AMWSA) in Pittsburgh, with the aim of uniting Muslims and eliminating racial differences. The AMWSA group, made of Arab immigrants and black American, continued its activities after Satti Majid's departure in 1929, by establishing branches in Detroit, New York City, Cleveland, and make connections in other cities like Chicago, Cincinnati, and Washington, D.C.

=== Noble Drew Ali and departure from the US ===
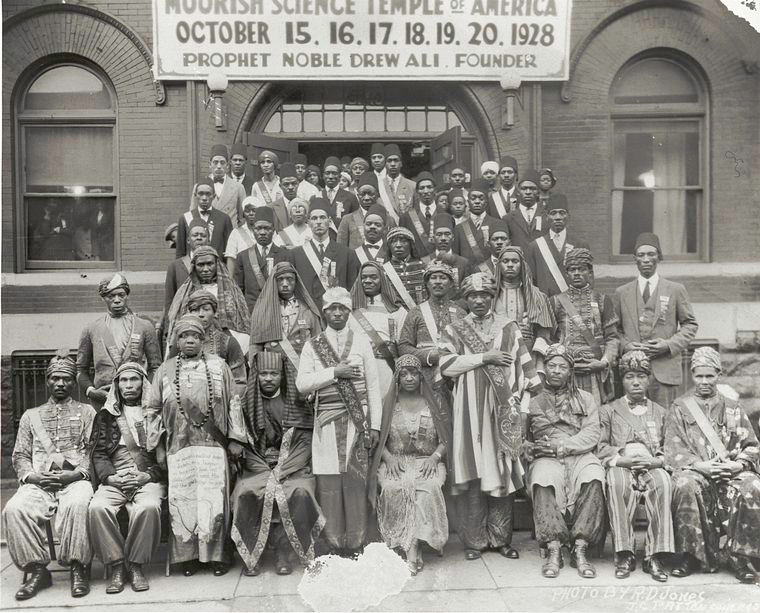
Attendees of the 1928 Moorish Science Temple Of America Convention in Chicago. Noble Drew Ali is in white in the front row centre.

In the early 20th century, Noble Drew Ali, founded the Moorish Science Temple of America. Ali was considered a prophet by his followers, and in 1913 he founded the Canaanite Temple in Newark, New Jersey, before relocating to Chicago, where he gained a following of thousands of converts. During that time, Satti Majid viewed Ali as part of an attempt to spreading sceptical views about the finality of Prophet Muhammad's message. This is because prophet Muhammad is known as the Seal of the Prophets to Muslims. Satti Majid was especially concerned about Noble Drew Ali's claims of being a prophet and his creation of a book named Circle Seven Koran. In response, Satti asked Ali to change his name and burn his Koran. Satti Majid also accused Ali of departing from Islam.

Satti Majid departed the United States on 13 January 1929, (Note: or 31 January 1929 with Satti Majid going to Alexandria from New York) and upon reaching Cairo, he aimed to secure a fatwa against Noble Drew Ali from Al-Azhar Al-Sharif. Al-Azhar issued a fatwa in Arabic along with an English translation branding Drew Ali as an "imposter and disbeliever." Satti Majid also garnered support for the fatwa from religious scholars in Sudan. However, there's no evidence that the fatwa reached the United States before Noble Drew Ali's death on 20 July 1929.

Satti Majid seemingly intended to use this official condemnation of Drew Ali upon his return to the US, intending it as a tool to attract followers among other Muslim leaders. He tried to raise funds for his return and requested al-Azhar's official recognition as a missionary to the US. Yet, in 1934, his request was denied by al-Azhar, which cited his lack of the required scholarly qualifications for the role. Thus, instead of going back to the United States, Satti Majid split his time during the 1930s between Egypt and Sudan.

Contrary to Bowen, Abu Shouk claimed that the United States government ultimately took the step of banishing Satti Majid from its territory due to concerns about potential religious and social conflicts. Other scholars argued that he was not allowed to the US because he was perceived as a potential Japanese agent by the FBI.

=== Egypt and return to Sudan ===
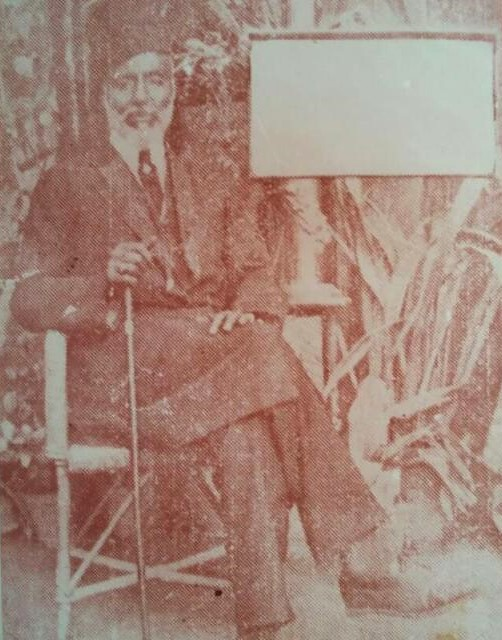
late Satti Majid

In Cairo, Satti Majid engaged in Islamic conventions, launched an Arabic-language Islamic magazine, and founded the Islamic Unity Association with branches in various locations. During the 1930s, he remained connected to African American Muslims in the US. His magazine reached US converts, and they participated in his Cairo-based association. Correspondence from his followers conveyed enthusiasm for his activities and a desire for news from both African Muslims and the broader Muslim world. He even proposed transatlantic trade and financial assistance.

Satti Majid returned to Sudan in 1943, and he was received by Sayed Abdul Rahman Al Mahdi (former leader of the Sudanese Umma Party), who held a great honouring ceremony for him attended by many religious, political and cultural delegations of various sects. His activity in Sudan was focused on the field of education by the establishment of mosques and khalawi in Dongola.

=== Personal life and death ===
Satti Majid stood 6 feet (180 cm) tall and had three vertical scars (shilukh) on both of his cheeks, which served as a distinct cultural identifier for males originating from Dongola region. He was an orthodox (Sunni) Muslim.

Satti Majid died on 17 March 1963, and was buried in al-Ghaddar village cemetery.

== Legacy and influence ==
According to Patrick D. Bowen, Satti Majid was "one of the most influential Muslims in the United States during the interwar period." He was instrumental in establishing a number of Muslim societies and organisations in various cities, including New York City, Buffalo, Detroit, and Pittsburgh. Satti Majid was dubbed Shaykh of Buffalo, Shaykh of America, and Shaykh al-Islam in North America for his work to convert African Americans to Islam, in which he achieved notable success in this endeavour. His efforts were pivotal in integrating American-born black individuals into Sunni Muslim organisations. Crucially, he believed that Islam could contribute to racial justice in the US.

Satti Majid was remembered in a memorial ceremony sponsored by Zain Sudan and held in the Friendship Hall, Khartoum on 1 October 2017. The event was under the auspices of the US Embassy in Khartoum, represented by the consul and a number of members of the US embassy, and in the presence of number of Sudanese officials led by Lieutenant General Abdel Rahim Mohammed Hussein, Governor of Khartoum State, Field Marshal Abdul Rahman Suwar Al Dhahab, former head of the transitional government, and Lieutenant General Al-Fatih Urwa, chairman of the Board of Directors of Zain Company. A group of members of the diplomatic corps, state ministers, intellectuals, community dignitaries, Satti Majid's family, and a large audience also attended. The memorial ceremony also featured the screening of a documentary about Satti Majid which was produced by Blue Nile Channel.

=== Daoud Faisal ===
Satti Majid played an influential role introducing large parts of New York city to mainstream Sunni Islam. One of these people was Shaykh Daoud Ahmed Faisal, born David A. Donald in Grenada in 1891. While Faisal pursued a career in music, he later embraced Islam through Satti Majid 's guidance. By 1928, Faisal had become Satti Majid 's representative in Harlem, gathering converts at a mosque established at 128th and Lenox Avenue. Although he initially retained his original name for professional reasons, he eventually adopted the name Daoud Faisal and fully committed to Islam in the late 1930s. He also helped found the International Muslim Society in Harlem, which linked African-American Muslims with their Somali, Yemeni, and South Asian co-religionists.

Faisal and his wife Khadija converted an apartment into the Islamic Mission of America (IMA) in Brooklyn in 1939, creating a thriving mosque and mission for indigent Muslims. The IMA became a renowned institution, promoting a Sunni anti-racist message that echoed Satti Majid's teachings. Daoud Faisal emerged as a prominent Muslim leader, participating in various organisations, interfaith initiatives, and serving as Morocco's representative at the United Nations. He also played a significant role in the creation of the Federation of Islamic Associations, a national umbrella organisation for Sunni Muslims. As stated by Bowen, Faisal's impact on American Muslim history and his role in furthering Satti Majid's legacy were unparalleled, solidifying Satti Majid's lasting influence in the United States.

=== Elijah Muhammad ===
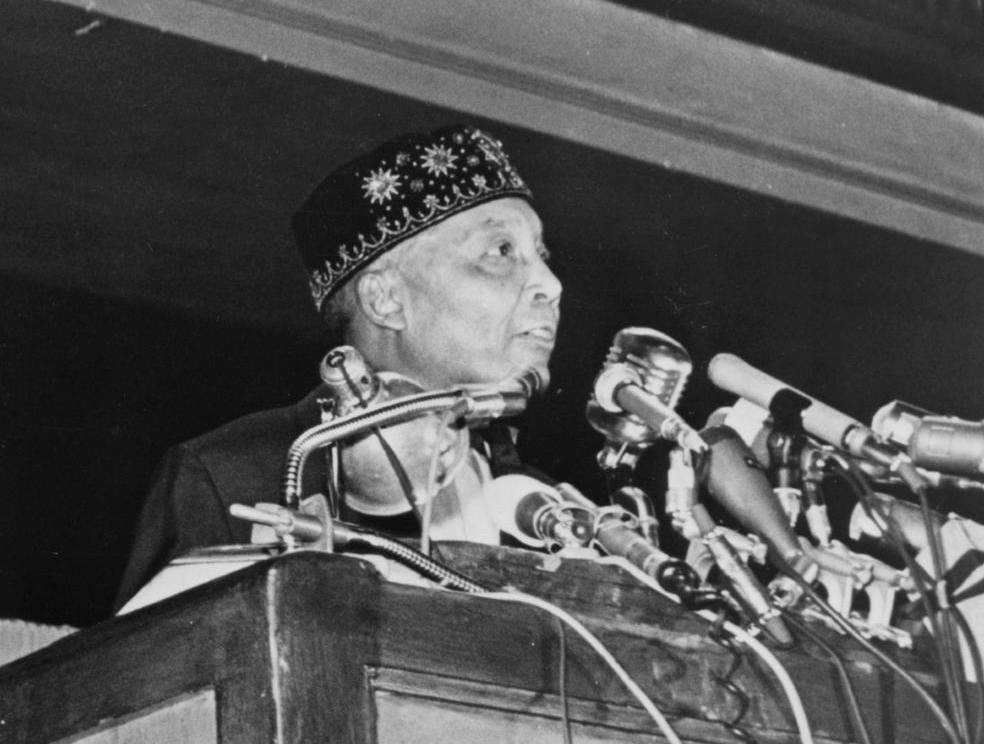
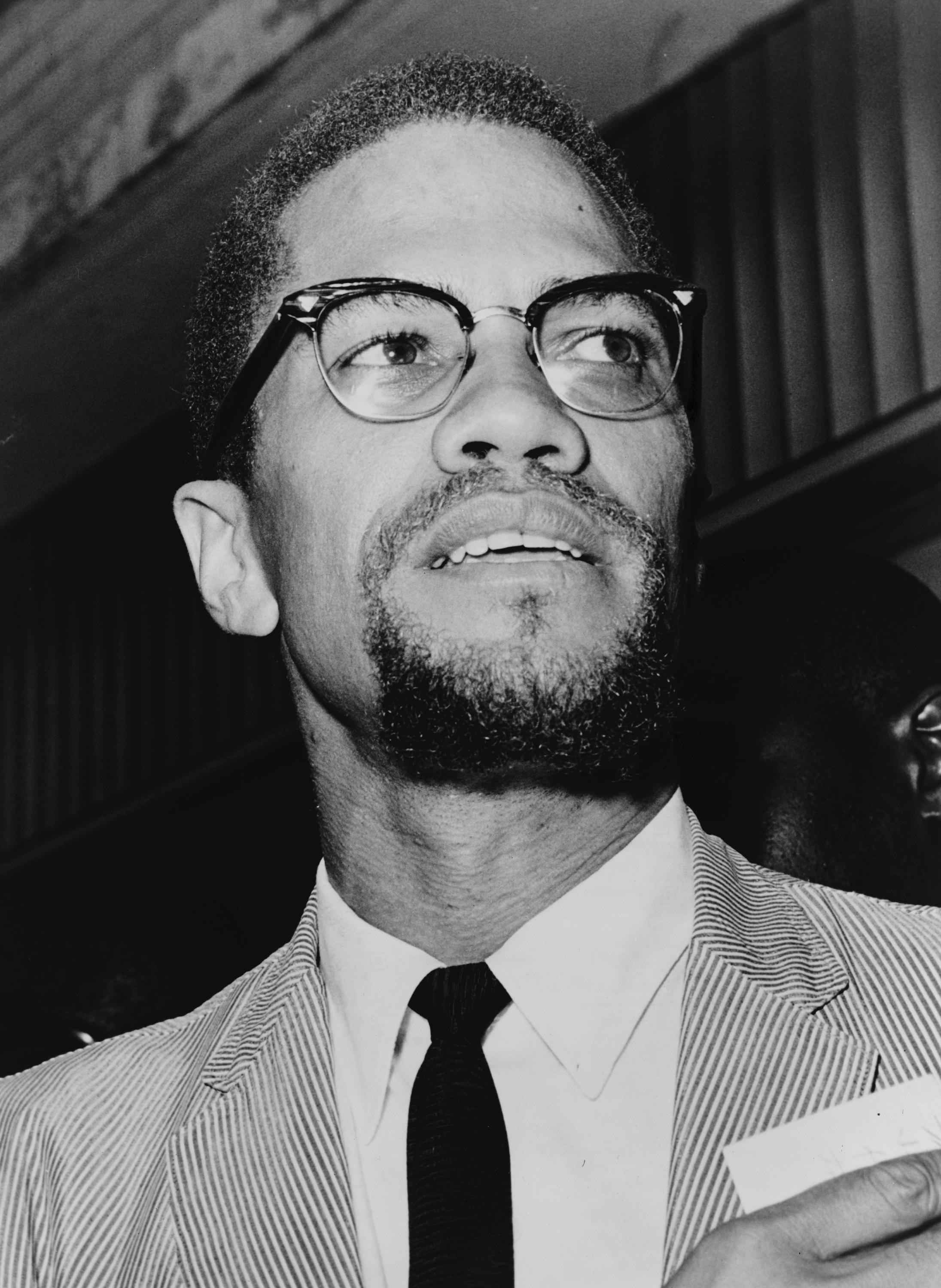
Satti Majid influenced Elijah Muhammad (left) and Malcolm X

According to Abu Shouk, Elijah Muhammad held the Majid in high esteem, considering him a model in values, ideals, and tolerance, an admiration shared by other black leaders and members of American society who regarded Satti Majid as a paramount educator. Elijah Muhammad addressed Satti Majid as the "Respectable Father Sheich of Islam of America" or the "Greatest Educator" in their correspondence. The communication between them persisted even after Satti Majid's departure from the US. An excerpt from a message written by Elijah Muhammad on 17 December 1928, underscores his acknowledgment of Satti Majid's contributions to the Islamic call and the impact it had on their community.

=== Malcolm X ===
Satti Majid's influence on Malcolm X was not direct, as Satti Majid had left the US for Egypt in 1929, when Malcolm X was just a child. Nevertheless, contemporary work by Sudanese Islamic scholar Muhammad Waqi Allah identified four influences that shaped Malcolm X's thinking, including the indirect influence of Satti Majid. This influence contributed to reshaping race relations in America by instilling confidence and pride in African Americans, encouraging their pursuit of rights, self-development, and societal progress. Satti Majid sought to convince Malcolm X through his followers to adopt Sunni Islam and leave Nation of Islam. Satti Majid advised his followers in Egypt to approach Malcolm X and offer guidance. Upon learning of Malcolm X's return to Sunni Islam, Satti Majid expressed happiness and gratitude.

== See also ==
- Ahmad Surkati – Founder of Arab Association for Reform and Guidance
- Mufti Muhammad Sadiq
- Sudan–United States relations
