= Tornado outbreak of November 20–21, 1900 =

Weather event in the United States

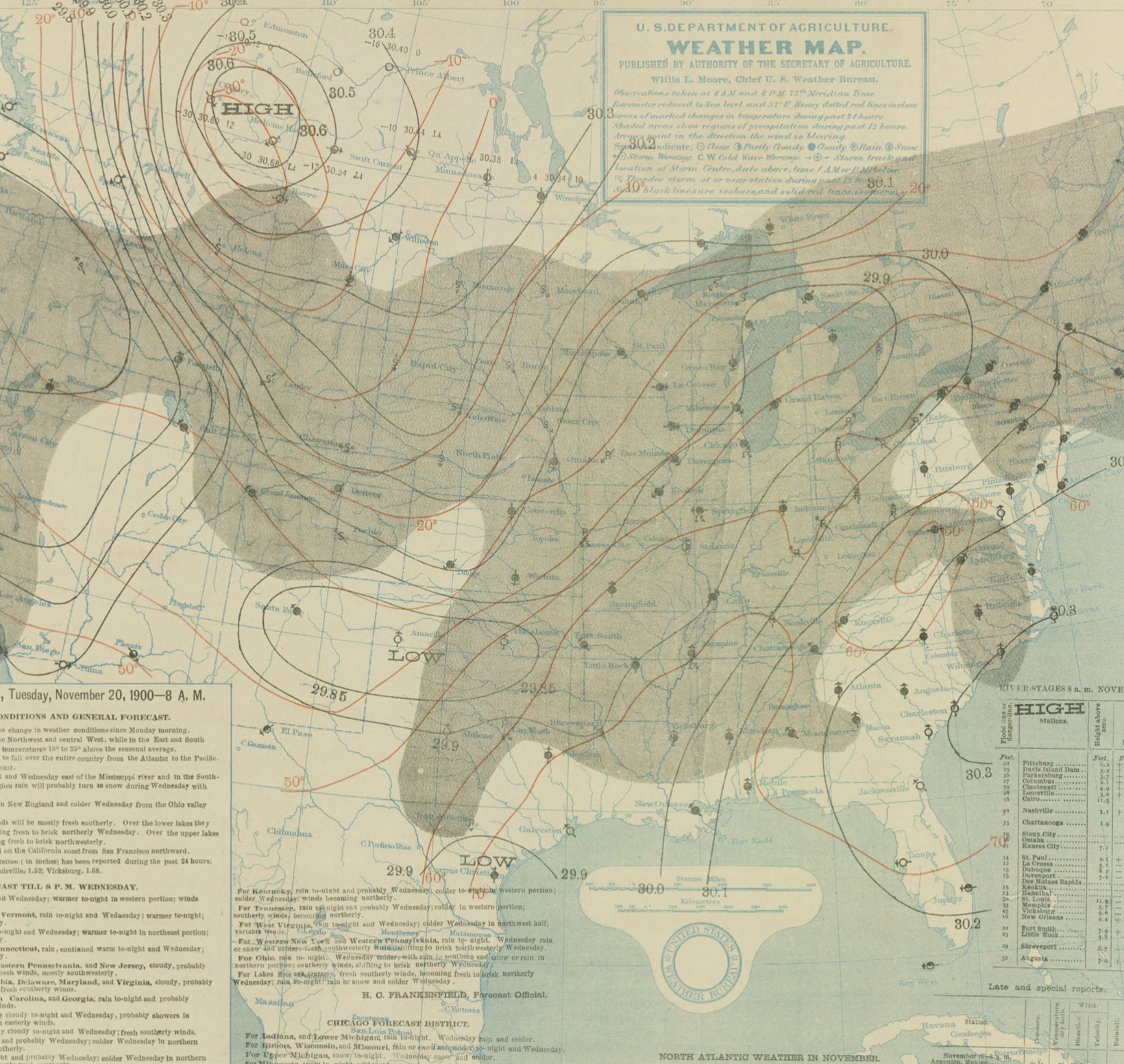
- Weather map on November 20, showing the low pressure system that produced the tornado outbreak across the Southern United States

Tornado outbreak
- Tornadoes: ≥ 14
- Max. rating: F4 tornado
- Duration: November 20–21, 1900

Overall effects
- Fatalities: ≥ 97
- Injuries: > 388
- Damage: >$90,000 ($3,480,000 in 2025 USD) (Note: All losses are in 1900 United States dollars unless otherwise noted.)
- Areas affected: Southern United States
- Part of the tornadoes and tornado outbreaks of 1900

On November 20–21, 1900, the deadliest November tornado outbreak in United States history killed at least 97 people and injured more than 388 others, generating at least 14 tornadoes; many of the tornadoes were long-lived and significant (F2 or stronger on the present-day Fujita scale). The deadliest of these tornadoes, retroactively rated F4, killed 42 people in northern Mississippi and southwestern Tennessee. Another F4 hit Columbia, Tennessee, killing 27 others. A deadly F3 also claimed half a dozen or more lives in Arkansas, while another F3 in Tennessee killed a dozen more. (Note: An outbreak is generally defined as a group of at least six tornadoes (the number sometimes varies slightly according to local climatology) with no more than a six-hour gap between individual tornadoes. An outbreak sequence, prior to (after) the start of modern records in 1950, is defined as a period of no more than two (one) consecutive days without at least one significant (F2 or stronger) tornado.)

== Confirmed tornadoes ==
Confirmed tornadoes by Fujita rating
FU	F0	F1	F2	F3	F4	F5	Total
0	0	2	6	4	2	0	≥ 14

- One or more tornadoes may have struck Lewis County, Tennessee.

Prior to 1990, there is a likely undercount of tornadoes, particularly E/F0–1, with reports of weaker tornadoes becoming more common as population increased. A sharp increase in the annual average E/F0–1 count by approximately 200 tornadoes was noted upon the implementation of NEXRAD Doppler weather radar in 1990–1991. (Note: Historically, the number of tornadoes globally and in the United States was and is likely underrepresented: research by Grazulis on annual tornado activity suggests that, as of 2001, only 53% of yearly U.S. tornadoes were officially recorded. Documentation of tornadoes outside the United States was historically less exhaustive, owing to the lack of monitors in many nations and, in some cases, to internal political controls on public information. Most countries only recorded tornadoes that produced severe damage or loss of life. Significant low biases in U.S. tornado counts likely occurred through the early 1990s, when advanced NEXRAD was first installed and the National Weather Service began comprehensively verifying tornado occurrences.) 1974 marked the first year where significant tornado (E/F2+) counts became homogenous with contemporary values, attributed to the consistent implementation of Fujita scale assessments. (Note: The Fujita scale was devised under the aegis of scientist T. Theodore Fujita in the early 1970s. Prior to the advent of the scale in 1971, tornadoes in the United States were officially unrated. Tornado ratings were retroactively applied to events prior to the formal adoption of the F-scale by the National Weather Service. While the Fujita scale has been superseded by the Enhanced Fujita scale in the U.S. since February 1, 2007, Canada used the old scale until April 1, 2013; nations elsewhere, like the United Kingdom, apply other classifications such as the TORRO scale.) Numerous discrepancies on the details of tornadoes in this outbreak exist between sources. The total count of tornadoes and ratings differs from various agencies accordingly. The list below documents information from the most contemporary official sources alongside assessments from tornado historian Thomas P. Grazulis.

=== November 20 event ===
List of confirmed tornadoes – Tuesday, November 20, 1900
F#	Location	County / Parish	State	Time (UTC) (Note: All dates are based on the local time zone where the tornado touched down; however, all times are in Coordinated Universal Time and dates are split at midnight CST/CDT for consistency.)	Path length	Width (Note: The listed width values are primarily the average/mean width of the tornadoes, with those having known maximum widths denoted by ♯. From 1952 to 1994, reports largely list mean width whereas contemporary years list maximum width. Values provided by Grazulis are the average width, with estimates being rounded down (i.e. 0.5 mi (0.80 km) is rounded down from 880 yards to 800 yards.)	Damage (Note: The National Oceanic and Atmospheric Administration's Storm Data publication does not list exact damage totals for every event, instead giving damage categories. As such, damage for individual tornadoes is not comprehensive.)
F1	Gallatin	Sumner	TN	14:00–?	4 mi (6.4 km)	Unknown	Unknown
F1	A tornado toppled and shredded trees, including some of the "finest"; tore a windmill "into a thousand pieces"; destroyed a mobile photograph gallery; wrecked small buildings; unroofed or destroyed some barns; knocked down chimneys; and tore up fences, according to local media. It also unroofed a mill, flattened a shed annex, smashed windows, blew away light fixtures, and badly damaged a tollhouse.						
F3	S of Stuttgart to Yoder to Moro to near Oak Forest	Arkansas, Monroe, Lee	AR	19:00–20:15	45 mi (72 km)	300 yd (270 m)	Unknown
F3	6+ deaths – An intense tornado leveled "dozens" of small homes near Blackton, according to Grazulis, claiming a life, and killed a few more near Ulm, where it wrecked dwellings. While fleeing school in a wagon, 15 children and a teacher encountered the tornado, 10 of whom received severe injuries. The tornado obliterated all but four buildings at Moro, where three people died. Three more deaths may have occurred at Yoder. 40 injuries occurred.						
F4	Moon Lake (MS) to near Strayhorn (MS) to La Grange (TN)	Coahoma (MS), Tunica (MS), Tate (MS), DeSoto (MS), Marshall (MS), Fayette (MS)	MS, TN	20:38–22:28	90 mi (140 km)	500 yd (460 m)	>$50,000
F4	42 deaths – A large, violent, long-lived tornado family, attended by much lightning, passed close to Lula, killing 15 people, badly damaging fences, and destroying numerous buildings. Between Arkabutla and Dundee it felled trees and more buildings, including "hundreds" of homes, leaving "general desolation" on plantations, reports noted, while moving bodies 1/2 mi (0.80 km). In the Strayhorn–Arkabutla area it killed 22 people and wrecked 10–12 buildings near Love, where possible multiple vortices were reported. Little or no damage occurred in Marshall County, where the tornado may have weakened or dissipated. Entering Tennessee, it wrecked 20 buildings at La Grange and killed two people there. A sign from Lula was found there, 80 mi (130 km) away. In all 100 people were injured.						
F2	Tutwiler to Batesville	Tallahatchie, Quitman, Panola	MS	22:30–?	30 mi (48 km)	100 yd (91 m)	Unknown
F2	An intermittent tornado, the first member of a two-state family, destroyed many barns and small homes, tracking erratically. It also tore the roof off a church and injured 15 people.						
F3	E of Hamilton	Marion	AL	23:30–?	4 mi (6.4 km)	200 yd (180 m)	Unknown
F3	A tornado destroyed three farmhouses, injuring 11 people. Reports described it as resembling a "half-open umbrella".						
F3	W of West Harpeth to Nolensville to La Vergne	Williamson, Davidson, Rutherford	TN	00:00–00:41	25 mi (40 km)	350 yd (320 m)♯	Unknown
F3	12+ deaths – An intense tornado wrecked "dozens" of homes, dispersing items "miles" from stores and houses, reports stated. 44 injuries occurred.						
F2	Bethlehem to Tacaleeche to northwestern Ripley to E of Corinth	Marshall, Union, Benton, Tippah, Alcorn	MS	00:30–01:30	55 mi (89 km)	200 yd (180 m)	Unknown
F2	2 deaths – The second member of the Tutwiler–Batesville family, this tornado wrecked a few homes each at Tacaleeche and Bethlehem. It then hit Ripley, destroying approximately 25 homes there and injuring 30 people. Near Corinth it swept away cabins. In all 40 injuries occurred.						
F2	Near Cayce (MS) to Tracy to Vance (MS) to near Moscow (TN)	Marshall (MS), Fayette (TN)	MS, TN	00:45–01:15	17–24 mi (27–39 km)	Unknown	Unknown
F2	3 deaths – A strong tornado annihilated a two-story home, a frame store, and a brick office. It also destroyed 10 cabins, a number of farmhouses, another residence, and a general store. 25 injuries occurred.						
F2	Near Huntington to N of Cleveland to N of Charleston to near Reynolds	Bolivar, Sunflower, Tallahatchie, Yalobusha, Panola	MS	01:00–03:30	95 mi (153 km)	Unknown	Unknown
F2	A probable tornado family injured 30 people, several critically, striking plantations. Little additional information is available.						
F3+	SW of Red Sulphur Springs to Lowryville to ENE of Houston	Hardin, Wayne	TN	02:00–?	25 mi (40 km)	Unknown	Unknown
F3+	4 deaths – Related to the Tutwiler–Corinth family, an intense tornado flattened trees, barns, houses, and fences, especially in the Indian Creek valley. At Lowryville it swept away a home, carrying off "every piece of timber", fencing, and trees on the property "as if swept by a broom", according to local media. Numerous other homes were leveled as well, and many injuries, some severe, were reported. The tornado also killed much livestock. Damage may have reached F4 or greater intensity.						
F4	SE of Ashwood to northern Columbia	Maury	TN	03:30–?	8 mi (13 km)	300 yd (270 m)	$40,000
F4	27 deaths – The last member of the Tutwiler–Houston family, a violent tornado annihilated "dozens" of homes, most of which were frail, according to Grazulis. It destroyed a cluster of approximately 25 houses just west of downtown Columbia, trapping 13 people beneath debris and causing most of the known deaths. It also leveled a mill, while downing fences and trees at an arsenal near present-day Columbia Academy. In all it wrecked about 50 buildings. 75 injuries occurred.						
F1	NE of Fairfield	Sumner	TN	Unknown	≥2 mi (3.2 km)	Unknown	Unknown
F1	A tornado unroofed a barn, leveled another, and destroyed a tenant home. It also ripped up fences and prostrated trees. The tornado intensified over time and likely crossed into Kentucky, but further details are unavailable.						
F2	Northern White House to N of Cottontown to NNW of Buck Lodge	Robertson, Sumner	TN	Unknown	8 mi (13 km)	Unknown	Unknown
F2	A strong tornado shifted, unroofed, and collapsed a schoolhouse, burying a dozen out of 26 pupils beneath the roof; none of the students received more than slight injuries. The tornado also leveled other barns, a smokehouse, a dwelling, and much timber, killing a horse. A few wagons were tossed against a tree as well, while barns and homes were unroofed. Eight injuries occurred.						

=== November 21 event ===
List of confirmed tornadoes – Wednesday, November 21, 1900
F#	Location	County / Parish	State	Time (UTC)	Path length	Width	Damage
F2	Near Huntsville	Madison	AL	08:30–?	3 mi (4.8 km)	100 yd (91 m)	Unknown
F2	A low-end F2 tornado unroofed or ripped apart 19 cabins.						

== See also ==
- Dixie Alley
- List of North American tornadoes and tornado outbreaks

== Sources ==
- Agee, Ernest M.; Childs, Samuel (June 1, 2014). "Adjustments in Tornado Counts, F-Scale Intensity, and Path Width for Assessing Significant Tornado Destruction". Journal of Applied Meteorology and Climatology. 53 (6). American Meteorological Society: 1494–1505. Bibcode:2014JApMC..53.1494A. doi:10.1175/JAMC-D-13-0235.1.
- Brooks, Harold E. (April 2004). "On the Relationship of Tornado Path Length and Width to Intensity". Weather and Forecasting. 19 (2): 310–19. Bibcode:2004WtFor..19..310B. doi:10.1175/1520-0434(2004)019<0310:OTROTP>2.0.CO;2.
- Cook, A. R.; Schaefer, J. T. (August 2008). "The Relation of El Niño–Southern Oscillation (ENSO) to Winter Tornado Outbreaks". Monthly Weather Review. 136 (8): 3121–3137. Bibcode:2008MWRv..136.3121C. doi:10.1175/2007MWR2171.1.
- Edwards, Roger; LaDue, James G.; Ferree, John T.; Scharfenberg, Kevin; Maier, Chris; Coulbourne, William L. (May 1, 2013). "Tornado Intensity Estimation: Past, Present, and Future". Bulletin of the American Meteorological Society. 94 (5). American Meteorological Society: 641–653. Bibcode:2013BAMS...94..641E. doi:10.1175/BAMS-D-11-00006.1.
- Emery, S. C. (November 1900) [20 November 1900]. "Tornadoes in Tennessee, Mississippi, and Arkansas". Monthly Weather Review. 28 (11). Washington, D.C.: United States Weather Bureau: 499–501. Bibcode:1900MWRv...28..499E. doi:10.1175/1520-0493(1900)28[499:TITMAA]2.0.CO;2 – via American Meteorological Society.
- Garriott, E. B. (November 1900). "Forecasts and warnings" (PDF). Monthly Weather Review. 28 (11). Washington, D.C.: U.S. Weather Bureau: 477–8. Bibcode:1900MWRv...28..477G. doi:10.1175/1520-0493(1900)28[477b:FAW]2.0.CO;2. Archived from the original (PDF) on 3 March 2017 – via American Meteorological Society.
- Grazulis, Thomas P. (May 1984). Violent Tornado Climatography, 1880–1982. OSTI (Technical report). NUREG. Washington, D.C.: Nuclear Regulatory Commission. OSTI 7099491. CR-3670.
  - — (November 1990). Significant Tornadoes 1880–1989. Vol. 2. St. Johnsbury, Vermont: The Tornado Project of Environmental Films. ISBN 1-879362-02-3.
  - — (July 1993). Significant Tornadoes 1680–1991: A Chronology and Analysis of Events. St. Johnsbury, Vermont: The Tornado Project of Environmental Films. ISBN 1-879362-03-1.
  - — (2001a). The Tornado: Nature's Ultimate Windstorm. Norman: University of Oklahoma Press. ISBN 978-0-8061-3538-0.
  - — (2001b). F5-F6 Tornadoes. St. Johnsbury, Vermont: The Tornado Project of Environmental Films.
