= Daoud Ahmed Faisal =

Sunni Muslim missionary

Daoud Ahmed Faisal (1891–1980) was a Sunni Muslim missionary and leader in the United States. He founded the Islamic Mission of America with his wife, Khadijah, which is also known as the State Street mosque and is located in Brooklyn, New York. Faisal was a follower of Satti Majid, a Sudanese, Sunni Muslim missionary who helped the spread of Sunni Islam in the United States. While Faisal also spent time in Buffalo, New York, he gained recognition for his work in New York City communities, first in Harlem and later in Brooklyn. Faisal often made visits to other Sunni Islamic centers in the United States, and had written works explaining Islamic topics in English for the American audience. Faisal died in 1980, but the Islamic Mission of America still remains today.

== Life before Islam ==
Daoud Ahmed Faisal was born David A. Donald in 1891 in Grenada. At 25 years old, Faisal arrived in to the United States. While Faisal was a trained tailor, his musical abilities were the focus of his early career. He was a professional violinist as well as a music manager and teacher.

In 1924, Faisal married Clara Forbes, a Black Bermudan, who would later change her name to Khadijah Faisal. Together, both Daoud and Khadijah taught music at the Donald Concert Bureau which Daoud had founded. A year after two married, Faisal became a naturalized United States citizen.

== Conversion and early contributions to Islam in New York City ==
At the time of meeting Satti Majid, Daoud Ahmed Faisal had not yet changed his name. Historian Patrick Bowen presumes that the face that Daoud Ahmed Faisal's father was a Moroccan Muslim may have explained Faisal's initial attraction to Majid's work.

Faisal initially started his work in Harlem, specifically on 128th street and Lenox Avenue. There, Faisal led the congregation. At the time, the congregation was made up of both those new to Islam and immigrants who sought to continue practicing Islam in the United States. Many of these congregants were also seaman who had newly arrived to New York. However, Faisal did not initially change his name when he first started working under Majid in Harlem. It was not until the late 1930s that Faisal would adopt his Muslim name, which was some time after he had already been leading the prayers in Harlem. His wife would soon follow to change her name from Clara to Khadijah.

In 1939, Daoud Ahmed and Khadijah Faisal moved to Brooklyn. They converted their apartment on 143 State Street into a mosque. The space soon expanded to accommodate the couple's vision to a have space for the Sunni Muslim community in Brooklyn and was renamed the Islamic Mission of America, also known at the IMA. Faisal was able to found the IMA with the help of a Pakistani immigrant named Maqbul Ilahi and a small group of Yemeni seamen. The mosque became a space in which numerous African-Americans converted at. When Dwight York was released from prison, he had come to the IMA to convert. While Faisal did catch the attention of many Muslim Sudanese immigrants due to his inspiration from Satti Majid, Islamic Mission of America was quite diverse. Sudanese Muslims did attend the IMA, but so did the many Black and white converts Faisal converted as well as many other Muslims from various backgrounds.

Faisal was also a strong supporter of the Pan-Islamic and anti-racist movements, and he was active in reaching out to various Sunni communities in the United States, including the Pakistan League of America. Faisal also acknowledged that his wife, as well as a man named M.A. Faridi from Iran and Bashir Ahmed Khan from Pakistan, were among the people who assisted him the most with the works he came to author. Additionally, Faisal, who was Black himself, was an advocate for African Americans in the United States.

While the mosque was accommodating of Muslims of many backgrounds, tensions arose in the 1960s when disagreements between Sunni Muslims and groups such as the Five Percenters and the Nation of Islam grew more intense. In 1967, Faisal had required that Black members of the mosque carry "Sunni identification cards" to verify they were not members of the Nation of Islam.

== Faisal's works and propagation ==
Faisal was well-recognized by the press, including by the New York Times, for his efforts in spreading Islam in the United States. His presence was further emphasized by his 1950 publication of Al-Islam: the Religion of Humanity, which was a 200-page collection of short works discussing Islamic topics. Faisal's publication discussed both the practice and history of Islam, and its contents being in English made it a means for him to spread Islam to American communities.

Satti Majid's motivation to spread Sunni Islam in the United States was partially motivated by his disagreement with the practices of the Nation of Islam and the Moorish Science Temple. Faisal, as a follower of Majid, thus dealt with tensions between his own work and these two groups.

== Other contributions to Islam in the United States of America ==
Beyond running the IMA in Brooklyn, Faisal was active in Muslim circle in New York City and beyond. He was a representative of Morocco at the United Nations, contributed to the creation of the United Islamic Society of America, which intended to serve Black Sunni Muslims in the United States, and furthered Satti Majid's vision to unite Sunni Muslims nationally by joining the Federation of Islamic Associations.
