= Islamic Cultural Center of New York =

Mosque and Islamic cultural center in East Harlem, New York City

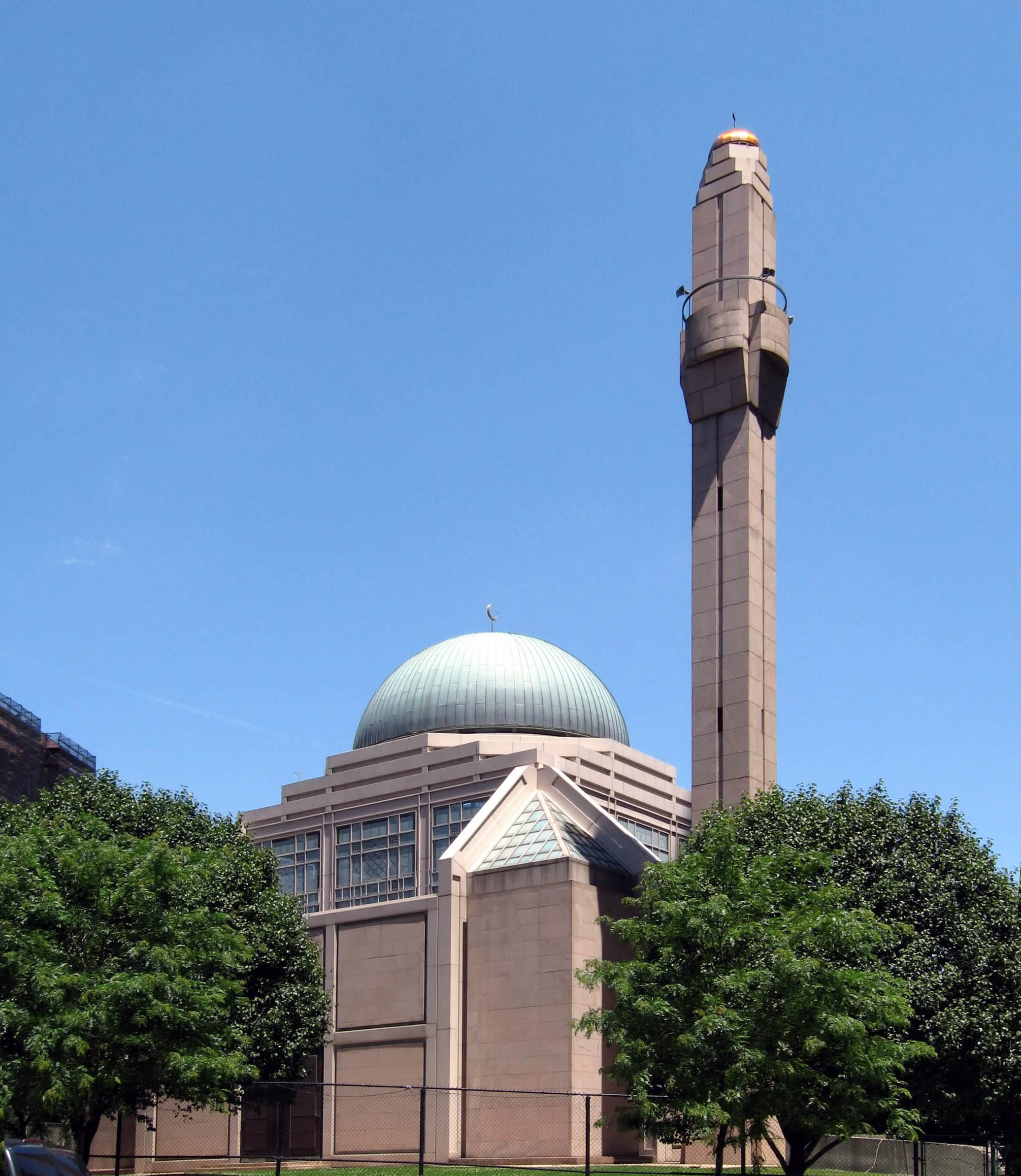
- Exterior view (2008)

Religion
- Affiliation: Islam

Location
- Location: 1711 Third Avenue, New York, NY 10029; United States
- Interactive map of Islamic Cultural Center of New York
- Coordinates: 40°47′7″N 73°56′55″W

Architecture
- Architect: Skidmore, Owings and Merrill
- Type: Mosque
- Style: post-modernism
- Groundbreaking: 1987
- Completed: 1991
- Construction cost: $14 million

Specifications
- Direction of façade: Mecca
- Capacity: Main prayer hall: 1,000
- Dome height (outer): 90 feet (27 m)
- Minaret height: 130 feet (40 m)
- Materials: Steel, concrete, marble, glass

Website
- icc-ny.us

The Islamic Cultural Center of New York is a postmodern mosque and an Islamic cultural center in East Harlem, Manhattan, New York City, United States. It is located at 1711 Third Avenue, between East 96th and 97th Streets. The Islamic Cultural Center was the first purpose-built mosque in New York and continues to be one of the city's largest. The mosque's older dwelling in a townhouse at 1 Riverside Drive is still in continual prayer use as a satellite location.

The Islamic Cultural Center of New York is a standing building that is 61 meters wide and 73 meters long. The mosque is located at the northeast corner of East 96th Street and 3rd Avenue, on the boundary of Manhattan's East Harlem and Upper East Side neighborhoods. When looking at it, the mosque is rotated 29 degrees towards the streets. The architects did this to portray the Turkish mosque and complete two goals. Those two goals were to stand out from its surroundings, and the mihrab can face Mecca, where it is the direction to pray towards the Kaaba.

== Design and history ==
Plans for a large Islamic center in New York were originally drawn up in the late 1960s. The first cultural center occupied a house at 1 Riverside Drive, at the intersection of Riverside Drive and 72nd Street. The first Islamic Center started functioning on a small scale from a modest townhouse at that address. However, the board of trustees later aspired to build a new larger center in a way suiting its prestigious position in the community, and to be one of the landmarks of New York City. Later, an overall project comprising a mosque, a school, a library, a museum, and a lecture hall was planned out. After years of delays which included raising funds from Muslim countries, a prolonged process of relocating tenants, and the eventual demolition of the buildings on the site, construction of the Islamic Cultural Center began in October 1984. Construction of the associated mosque began on May 28, 1987, the day which corresponded to the end of Ramadan. The cornerstone of the minaret was laid on September 26, 1988.

Construction was delayed during the Iraqi Invasion of Kuwait and the First Gulf War. The mosque opened on April 15, 1991, for the feast of Eid ul-Fitr. In the end, more than 46 Muslim countries made contributions toward the $17 million construction cost of the mosque.

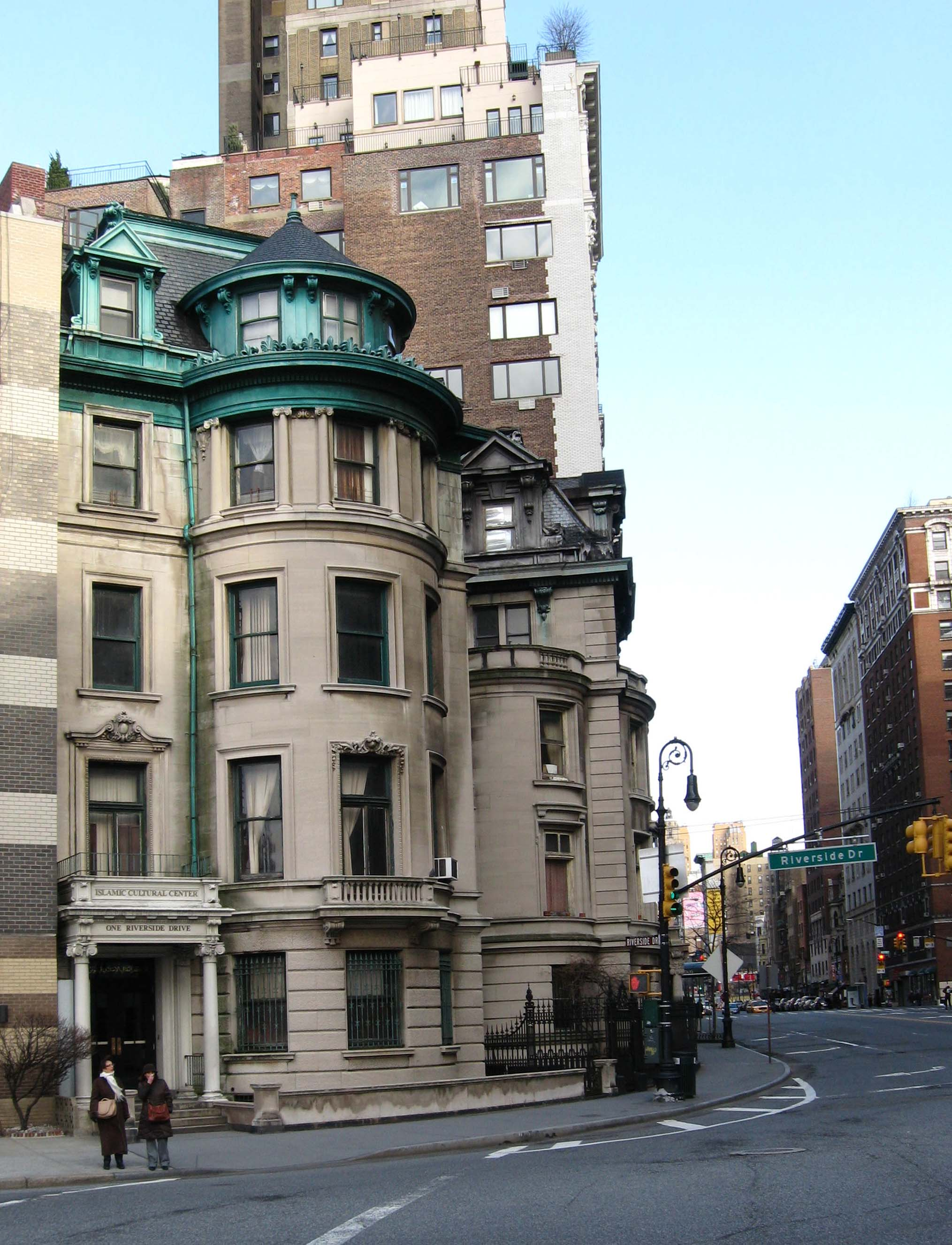
One Riverside Drive, the site of New York's first Islamic cultural center

Today, like most mosques, the mosque at the Islamic Cultural Center of New York is oriented toward Mecca at a heading of 58°. Consequently, the building is rotated 29° from Manhattan's north-south street grid, which in turn is rotated 29° from due north-south. The precise calculation of the direction from New York to Mecca was based on the great circle that produces the shortest distance between the two cities. As with many mosques, the direction of Mecca is marked inside by a niche on the wall, known as the mihrab. Placed in the center of the large room, the mihrab is ornamented with a large design. Additionally, next to the mihrab is the minbar, which is a staircase from which the imam leads prayer.

== Building design ==
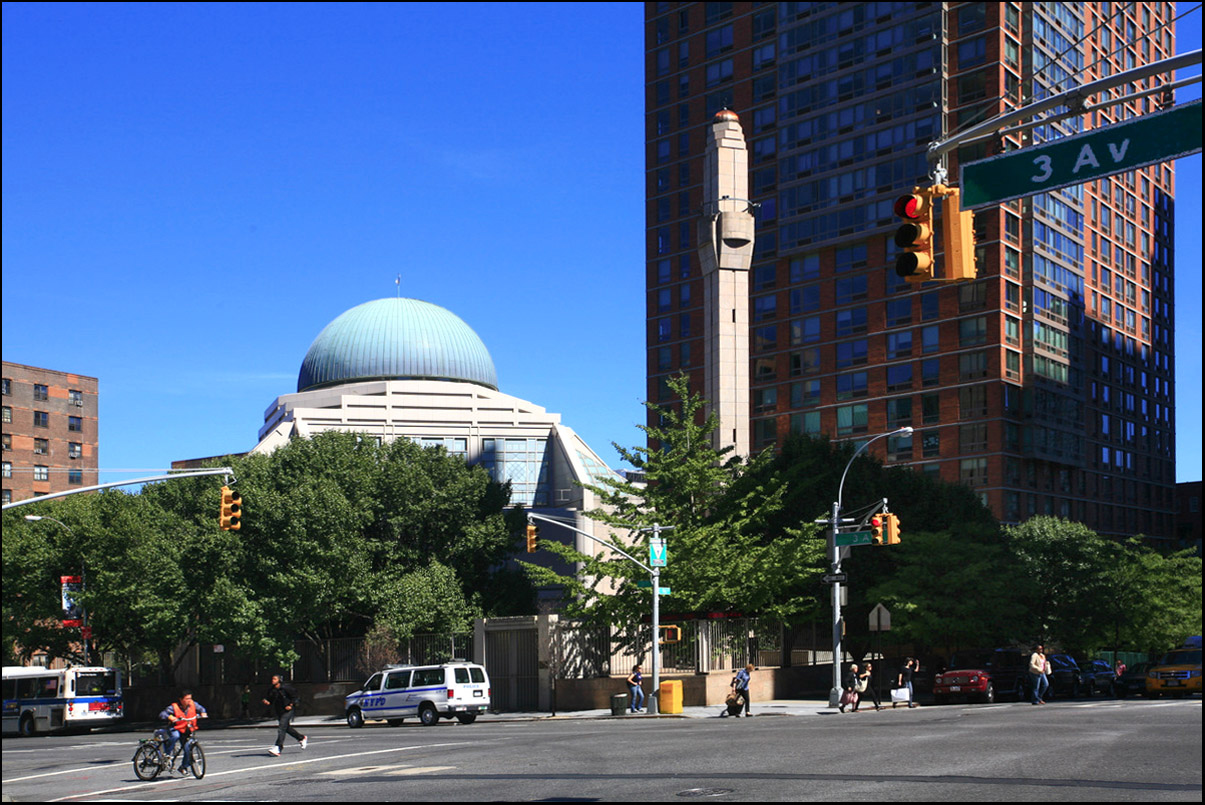
Exterior of the Islamic Cultural Center of New York, at the boundary of East Harlem and Upper East Side, in Manhattan.

The site has an edge length of 274 meters. Furthermore, it also includes eight columns and four trusses, where they all intersect, forming a solid framework to contain the building and balance it out. The building also consists of six infill panels containing slabs of pink granite with glass beading placed in front of welded steel tubes. The Islamic Culture Center of New York has two floors that separate the men and women. These two floors consist of each gender's washroom, meeting and administration rooms, and a prayer hall for everyone to use.

The design of the Islamic Culture Center of New York is designed based on a pure cube. Three identical windows are set at a certain angle on the left and right the corner of the buildings, where light can come through it and shine the masjid. The mosque walls are clad with stone from a quarry located in Stony Creek, Bradford, Connecticut. The central aspect of the building is the dome, where it is three stacked layers of frames and takes the shape of a hemisphere. Another essential part about the crown is that even though the masjid interior and exterior are designed very differently, the mosque's dome is made of copper, such as the Statue of Liberty located in New York.

== Outreach ==
Imam Abu-Namous engaged in a series of interfaith dialogues with prominent Muslim leaders and rabbis. Abu-Namous's successor as imam, Mohammed Shamsi Ali, continued the meetings. Due to political differences, Ali was fired from his post in 2011. Ali was replaced with Abdul Razzaq E. Al Amiri.

== See also ==
- List of mosques in the Americas
- Lists of mosques
- List of mosques in the United States
- Islam in New York City
- Islam in the United States
- Islamic architecture
- Park51, canceled Islamic center in the World Trade Center area
