= Bengali Harlem and the Lost Histories of South Asian America =

2013 book by Vivek Bald

- Author: Vivek Bald
- Language: English
- Genre: Historical non-fiction
- Publisher: Harvard University Press
- Publication date: January 2013
- Publication place: United States
- Media type: Hardcover
- Pages: 294
- ISBN: 978-0-674-06666-3

Bengali Harlem and the Lost Histories of South Asian America is a non-fiction book by American academic and filmmaker Vivek Bald about the historical migration of Bengali people from South Asia to the United States.

== About author ==
Vivek Bald is an associate professor of writing and digital media at the Massachusetts Institute of Technology and a filmmaker.

== Content ==
The book examines the arrival of Bengali sellers in Harlem in the early part of the 20th century, and the establishment of a Bengali neighborhood in Harlem in the 1920s. The book also examines the arrival of Bengali Hindu settlers in Treme, New Orleans. The book was inspired by a Bengali man, a sailor from Bengal who settled in Harlem in the 1930s. The book examines passenger records and census papers to picture the life of early Bengali settlers and how they settled in largely African-American neighborhoods because of racial segregation then.

== Reception ==
Bald was selected for a Whiting Public Engagement Fellowship for 2017-18 based on this book. The book has been called "intricately researched and exquisitely rendered," and was described in the Huffington Post as a "brilliantly revelatory book."

== See also ==
- Bengali Americans
