= The Aquarian Gospel of Jesus the Christ =

Book by Levi H. Dowling

The Aquarian Gospel of Jesus the Christ: The Philosophic and Practical Basis of the Religion of the Aquarian Age of the World and of the Church Universal
- Click to access a PDF
- Author: Levi H. Dowling
- Language: English
- Published: 1 December 1908

The Aquarian Gospel of Jesus the Christ (full title: The Aquarian Gospel of Jesus the Christ: The Philosophic and Practical Basis of the Religion of the Aquarian Age of the World and of the Church Universal) is a book by Levi H. Dowling. It was first published on 1 December 1908. Dowling said he had transcribed the text of the book from the akashic records, a purported compendium of mystical knowledge supposedly encoded in a non-physical plane of existence. In the later 20th century, it was adopted by New Age spiritual groups.

The title is derived from the practice in astrology of naming time periods in terms of constellations and their dominant positions in the sky, according to the earth's axial precession. In that system, the Age of Aquarius is approaching.

== Composition ==
- SECTION I (Aleph): Birth and Early Life of Mary, Mother of Jesus
- SECTION II (Beth): Birth and Infancy of John, the Harbinger, and of Jesus
- SECTION III (Gimel): Education of Mary and Elizabeth in Zoan
- SECTION IV (Daleth): Childhood and Early Education of John the Harbinger
- SECTION V (He): Childhood and Early Education of Jesus
- SECTION VI (Vau): Life and Works of Jesus in India
- SECTION VII (Zain): Life and Works of Jesus in Tibet and Western India
- SECTION VIII (Cheth): Life and Works of Jesus in Persia
- SECTION IX (Teth): Life and Works of Jesus in Assyria
- SECTION X (Jod): Life and Works of Jesus in Greece
- SECTION XI (Caph): Life and Works of Jesus in Egypt
- SECTION XII (Lamed): The Council of the Seven Sages of the World
- SECTION XIII (Mem): The Ministry of John, the Harbinger
- SECTION XIV (Nun): The Christine Ministry of Jesus—Introductory Epoch
- SECTION XV (Samech): The First Annual Epoch of the Christine Ministry of Jesus
- SECTION XVI (Ain): The Second Annual Epoch of the Christine Ministry of Jesus
- SECTION XVII (Pe): The Third Annual Epoch of the Christine Ministry of Jesus
- SECTION XVIII (Tzaddi): The Arrest and Betrayal of Jesus
- SECTION XIX (Koph): The Trial and Execution of Jesus
- SECTION XX (Resh): The Resurrection of Jesus
- SECTION XXI (Schin): Materialization of the Spiritual Body of Jesus
- SECTION XXII (Tau): Establishment of the Christine Church

== Major points ==
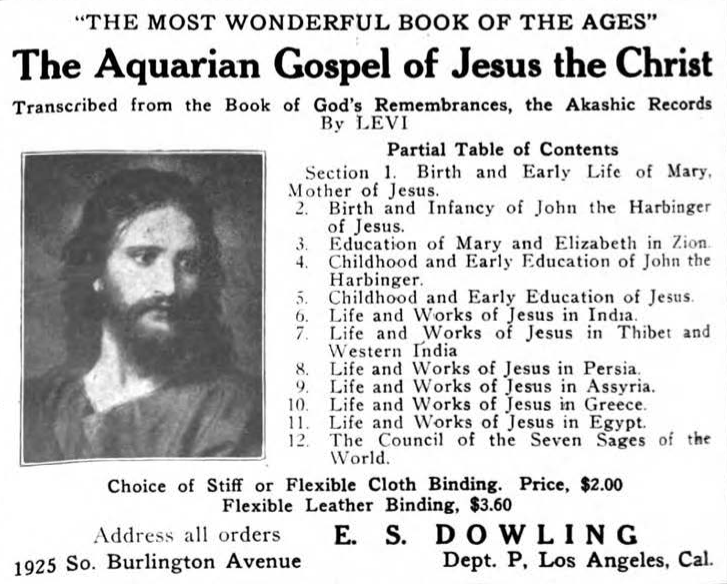
The Aquarian Gospel of Jesus the Christ advert, published in 1918

The Aquarian Gospel makes the following claims, among others:

- The revelation of The Aquarian Gospel was prophesied 2,000 years ago by Elihu, who conducted a school of the prophets in Zoan, Egypt. He said thus:
  This age will comprehend but little of the works of Purity and Love; but not a word is lost, for in the Book of God's Remembrance a registry is made of every thought and word and deed.
  And When The world is ready to receive, lo, God will send a messenger to open up the book and copy from its sacred pages all the messages of Purity and Love.
  — Aquarian Gospel 7:25–26
- There are 18 unknown years of Jesus' life missing in the Bible (ages 12–30). Like Nicolas Notovitch did before in his The Unknown Life of Jesus Christ: By the Discoverer of the Manuscript (1887), the Aquarian Gospel documents these 18 years as a time when Jesus travels to the centers of wisdom in western India, Tibet, Persia, Assyria, Greece, and Egypt. In each of these capital cities, he is educated, tested, and teaches the religious leaders. Jesus inevitably proves that he is 'God's chosen one' (the Christ) in these locales and brings back this multi-cultural wisdom and confidence to Galilee and Judea.
- Jesus puts on the role of the Christ, but is not automatically Christ by nature. By making himself, through desire, effort, ability, and prayer, a fit vessel, Jesus enabled the Christ to dwell within him. Christ is therefore used as a term for the seemingly perfect human being that Jesus exemplified, a human being that has been "Christened" (anointed) and therefore made holy.
- Jesus came to Earth to show the way back to God via his lifestyle and teachings. He is the example mankind must model their own lives after, if they seek salvation.
- Reincarnation exists and karma ("You reap what you sow") is the explanation for various injustices. Reincarnation allows people to settle debts they have incurred in past lives.
- Humanity has forgotten God and is currently working its way back to fully remembering God.
- Time is separated into ages. These ages last approximately 2,000 years. Mankind is now nearing the start of the Aquarian Age.
- All souls will eventually mature and evolve towards the perfect, like Jesus the Christ.
- No soul is ever abandoned by God.
- The trinity is strength, love and wisdom.

== Difficulties ==
In his 1931 book Strange New Gospels, the biblical scholar Edgar J. Goodspeed noted:

"Augustus Caesar reigned and Herod Antipas was ruler in Jerusalem." This opening sentence of the new gospel does not encourage any very high hopes as to its historical value. It is generally accepted that Antipas never rules in Jerusalem but in Galilee. Of course Dowling means Herod the Great.

Goodspeed also noted that Dowling borrowed a number of details from the apocryphal Gospel of James such as details about the childhood of Mary and her marriage to Joseph, the birth of Jesus in a cave, and the account of the death of Zacharias which differs from the account given by Origen and other early Fathers. Goodspeed notes that the many ancient religions and philosophies taught, in many different countries, to young Jesus in the book seem "colored by Christian Science."

Eric Pement has pointed out difficulties in Dowling's text:

- The book depicts Jesus as visiting the cities of Lahore, India (pre-Partition in India, now in Pakistan), Shri Jagannath in the temple at Puri in Odisha, India, and Persepolis in Persia. Only the temple at Puri existed at that period; Lahore did not exist during the period in question, and Persepolis had already been destroyed by Alexander the Great. The book asserts Jesus had remained in the Jagannātha Temple of Puri for four years, preaching among the downtrodden and low caste people.
- Dowling and Edgar Cayce both claimed to have produced an account of the life of Jesus through the transcription of the Akashic records, but there are significant differences between their accounts.
- Dowling claimed that Jesus knew Meng-tse of Lhasa, Tibet but Meng-tse lived 300 years before Jesus' time.

Supporters of Dowling argue that within theosophical thought, figures such as Meng-Tse, Matheno, Miriam, Moses, Elijah, and Vidyapati exist in an ascended state. As such, they communicated with Jesus after they had passed on from earthly existence.

== Aquarian church ==
The Aquarian Christine Church Universal, Inc. (ACCU) is a denomination based on the Aquarian Gospel. Members are commonly called Aquarians, but the proper term would be Aquarian Christines. The name Christine is used in the Aquarian Gospel instead of Christian, emphasizing that the church is the Bride of Christ. The church was incorporated in 2006, but had existed for numerous years previous to incorporation. There are no paid professional clergy.

The teachings of the Aquarian Church are based primarily on the Aquarian Gospel, but also on other writings by Levi Dowling, and share many teachings with the I AM Activity (I AM Movement) and Ascended Master Teachings. Some of the teachings include a Triune God, composed of God the Father, Christ the Son, and Holy Spirit the Mother, release from the cycle of rebirth through the Ascension Process, the equality of the races and sexes and the transformation (transmuting) of the individual, and the world through the study and practice of the teachings.

The Moorish Science Temple of America, a religion predominantly adhered to by African-Americans, founded five years after the publication of the Aquarian Gospel, takes much of its "Holy Koran" from the Aquarian Gospel.

== See also ==
- Jesuism
- List of Gospels
- New religious movement
- Theosophy
