= Huntington, Mississippi =

Huntington
- Ghost town
- Location within Mississippi Location within the United States
- Coordinates: 33°33′52″N 91°10′17″W
- Country: United States
- State: Mississippi
- County: Bolivar
- Time zone: UTC-6 (Central (CST))
  - Summer (DST): UTC-5 (CDT)

Huntington is a ghost town in Bolivar County, Mississippi, United States.

Located on the Mississippi River, Huntington was an important shipping location.

== History ==
The settlement was first called "Wilkerson" and "Wilkerson's Landing".

Oscar L. Shelby married the widow of Thomas Jefferson Wilkerson, in the 1870s. The town was built on the Wilkerson estate. Shelby later became a member of the Mississippi House of Representatives.

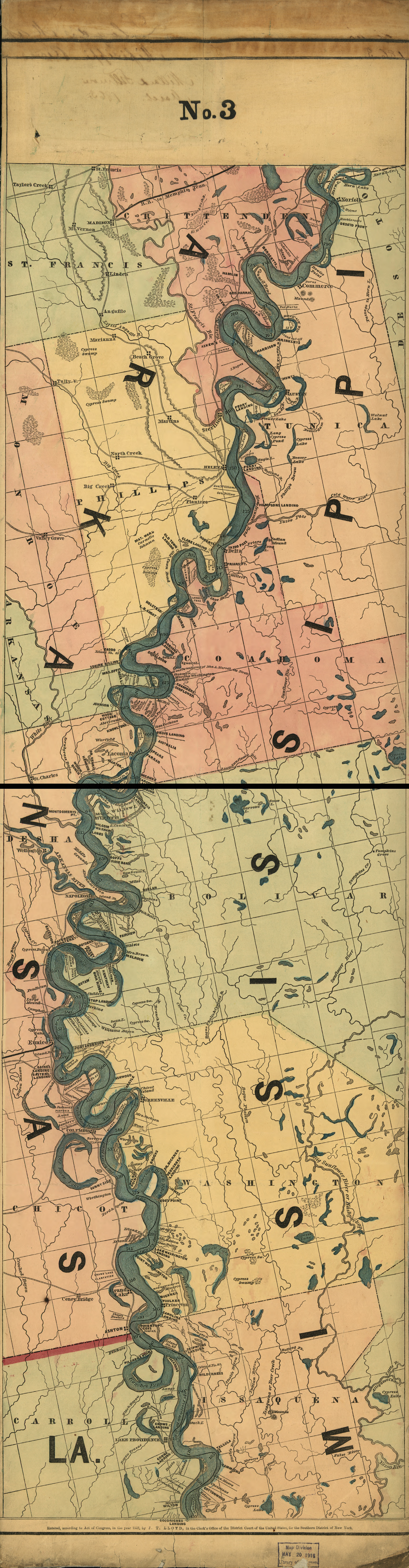
An 1862 map shows the location of Wilkerson (later called Huntington)

Wilkerson had a small store and some cottage homes.

In 1885, the "Arkansas City Branch" of the Louisville, New Orleans and Texas Railway was completed to Wilkerson. The name of the settlement was changed to "Huntington" to honor railroad magnate Collis Potter Huntington, who founded the Columbus and Greenville Railway. The railway was built to this location because Huntington was directly across the Mississippi River from Arkansas City, Arkansas, which was the terminus of the St. Louis, Iron Mountain and Southern Railway (StLIM&S). A ferry owned by the StLIM&S would carry goods and railroad cars across the river.

From 1885 to 1903, Huntington had a post office.

Huntington was incorporated on March 6, 1886. That same year, a large sawmill was established which supplied timber for local trade and to construct most of the buildings in Huntington.

It was described that at Huntington, "bunco men, crap shooters, all kinds of gamblers...gathered from all parts of the country—Greenville, Vicksburg, Leland, etc.", and that "on levee workers' paydays...a crowd of 200 men and women quickly gathered for gambling and drinking", after which "fights commenced".

Huntington was flooded in 1890, 1897, and 1903.

Although Huntington no longer exists, several nearby geographic features retain its name. A large body of land (on which the settlement was located) is now called "Huntington Point"; a sand bar in the Mississippi River is called "Huntington Bar"; a levee on the north shore of Huntington Point is called "Huntington Point Revetment"; and the location of the former settlement is accessible from "North Huntington Point Road".
