= Moorish Science Temple of America =

American national and religious organization

- Type: Organization
- Classification: Islam
- Orientation: Esoteric
- Scripture: Holy Koran of Mecca, Holy Koran of the Moorish Science Temple of America
- Founder: Noble Drew Ali
- Origin: 1925
- Separations: Nation of Islam; Moorish Orthodox Church of America
- Official website: moorishsciencetempleofamerica.org

The Moorish Science Temple of America is an American national and religious organization founded by Noble Drew Ali (born Timothy Drew) in the early 20th century. He based it on the premise that African Americans are descendants of the Moabites and thus "Moorish" by nationality, and Islamic by faith. Ali put together elements of major traditions to develop a message of personal transformation through historical education, racial pride, and spiritual uplift. His doctrine was also intended to provide African Americans with a sense of identity in the world and promote civic involvement.

One primary tenet of the Moorish Science Temple is the belief that African Americans are descended from the "Moroccan Empire". According to Ali, this area included other countries around Northwest Africa. To join the movement, individuals must proclaim their "Moorish nationality". They were given "nationality cards". In religious texts, adherents refer to themselves racially as "Asiatics", as the Middle East is also Western Asia. Adherents of this movement are known as "Moorish-American Moslems" and are called "Moorish Scientists" in some circles.

The Moorish Science Temple of America was incorporated under the Illinois Religious Corporation Act 805 ILCS 110. Timothy Drew, known to its members as Prophet Noble Drew Ali, founded the Moorish Science Temple of America in 1913 in Newark, New Jersey, a booming industrial city. After some difficulties, Ali moved to Chicago, establishing a center there and temples in other major cities. The movement expanded rapidly during the late 1920s. The rapid expansion of the Moorish Science Temple arose in large part from the search for identity and context among black Americans during the Great Migration to northern cities, as they became an urbanized people.

Competing factions developed among the congregations and leaders, especially after the death of the charismatic Ali. Three independent organizations developed from this ferment. The founding of the Nation of Islam by Wallace Fard Muhammad in 1930 also created competition for members. In the 1930s, membership was estimated at 30,000, with one-third in Chicago. During the postwar years, the Moorish Science Temple of America continued to increase in membership, albeit at a slower rate.

== Biography of Drew ==
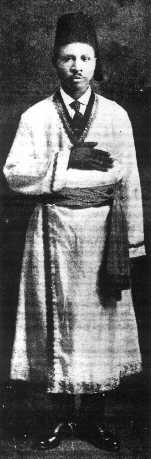
Noble Drew Ali

Timothy Drew is believed to have been born on January 8, 1886, in North Carolina, United States. Sources differ as to his background and upbringing: one reports he was the son of two former slaves who was adopted by a tribe of Cherokee; another describes Drew as the son of a Moroccan Muslim father and a Cherokee mother. In 2014, an article in the online Journal of Race Ethnicity and Religion attempted to link Timothy Drew to one Thomas Drew, born January 8, 1886, using census records, a World War I draft card, and street directory records.

== Founding of the Moorish Science Temple ==
Drew Ali reported that he met with a high priest of Egyptian magic during his travels. In one version of Drew Ali's biography, the leader saw him as a reincarnation of the founder. In others, he says that the priest considered him a reincarnation of Jesus, the Buddha, Muhammad, and other religious prophets. According to the biography, the high priest trained Ali in mysticism and gave him a "lost section" of the Quran.

This text became known as the Holy Koran of the Moorish Science Temple of America. It is also known as the Circle Seven Koran because of its cover, which features a red "7" surrounded by a blue circle. The first 19 chapters are from The Aquarian Gospel of Jesus the Christ, published in 1908 by esoteric preacher and Ohioan Levi Dowling. In The Aquarian Gospel, Dowling described Jesus's supposed travels in India, Egypt, and Palestine during the years of his life not accounted for by the Christian New Testament.

Chapters 20 to 45 are adapted from the Rosicrucian work Unto Thee I Grant, featuring minor stylistic changes. They provide guidance on living, education, and the responsibilities of adherents.

Drew Ali wrote the last four chapters of the Circle Seven Koran himself. In these, he wrote:

The fallen sons and daughters of the Asiatic Nation of North America need to learn to love instead of hate; and to know of their higher self and lower self. This is the uniting of the Holy Koran of Mecca for teaching and instructing all Moorish Americans, etc. The key of civilization was and is in the hands of the Asiatic nations. The Moorish, who were the ancient Moabites, and the founders of the Holy City of Mecca.

Drew Ali and his followers used this material to claim, "Jesus and his followers were Asiatic." ("Asiatic" was the term Drew Ali used for all darkly- or olive-colored people; he labeled all Whites as European.) He suggested that all Asiatics should be allied.

Ali crafted Moorish Science from a variety of sources, a "network of alternative spiritualities that focused on the power of the individual to bring about personal transformation through mystical knowledge of the divine within". In the inter-war years in Chicago and other major cities, he used these concepts to preach racial pride and uplift. His approach appealed to thousands of African Americans who had left severely oppressive conditions in the South through the Great Migration and faced struggles in new urban environments.

== Practices and beliefs ==
Ali believed that all African Americans are Moors, descended from the ancient Moabites, and taught that the kingdom of Moab evolved into modern Morocco. His claim does not align with peer-reviewed studies of human history, such as the genetics of African Americans and genetic history of sub-Saharan Africa. He claimed that Islam and its teachings are more beneficial to African Americans' salvation and that their "true nature" had been "withheld" from them. In the traditions Ali founded, male members of the Temple wear a fez or a turban as a head covering; women wear a turban.

Ali's followers added the suffixes Bey or El to their surnames to signify a connection to "Moorish heritage" and assert a new identity as "Moorish" Americans. This practice helped establish a distinct identity, acknowledging the loss of ancestral African tribal names while communicating their new identity.

As Ali taught his followers to be better citizens, he delivered speeches like "A Divine Warning By the Prophet for the Nations", urging them to reject labels such as "Black", "colored", and "Negro". He encouraged all Americans to embrace love over hate, believing Chicago could become a second Mecca.

The ushers of the Temple wore black fezzes. The leader of a given temple was known as a Grand Sheikh or Governor. Ali had several wives. According to The Chicago Defender, he claimed the power to marry and divorce at will.

== History ==
Noble Drew Ali (top center) with Chicago Alderman Louis B. Anderson (to his right) and Congressman Oscar De Priest (left)

=== Early history ===
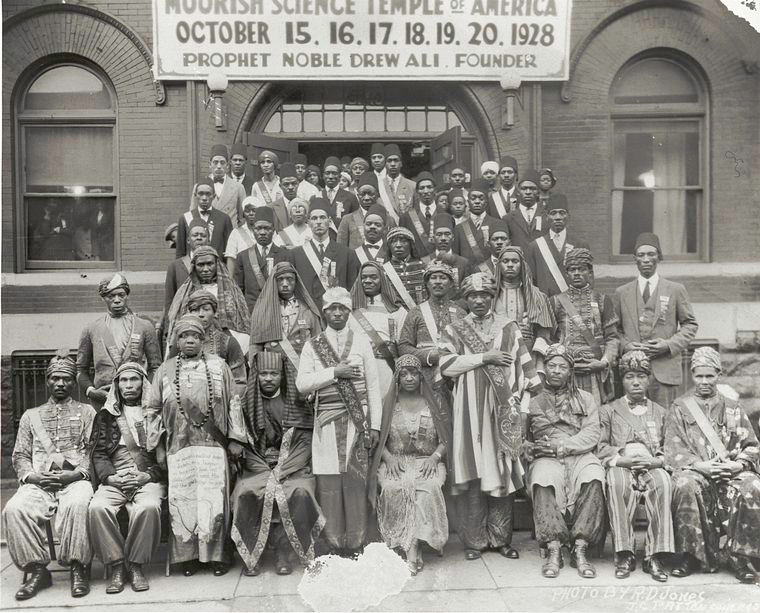
Attendees of the 1928 Moorish Science Temple Of America Convention in Chicago. Noble Drew Ali is in white in the front row center.

In 1913, Drew Ali formed the Canaanite Temple in Newark, New Jersey. He left the city after agitating people with his views on race. Drew Ali and his followers migrated while planting congregations in Philadelphia, Washington, D.C., and Detroit. Finally, Drew Ali settled in Chicago in 1925, saying the Midwest was "closer to Islam". The following year, he officially registered Temple No. 9.

Ali advised his followers to avoid confrontation and instead focus on uplifting their community to earn respect. By doing so, they could establish their position in the United States by cultivating a cultural identity aligned with his beliefs regarding Black personhood. In the late 1920s, Chicago Tribune journalists estimated the Moorish Science Temple had 35,000 members in 17 temples in cities across the Midwest and upper South. It was reportedly studied and watched by the Chicago police.

Building Moorish Science-affiliated businesses was part of the group's program, which was similar to Marcus Garvey's Universal Negro Improvement Association and African Communities League and the later Nation of Islam. By 1928, members of the Moorish Science Temple of America had obtained some respectability within Chicago and Illinois, being featured prominently and favorably in The Chicago Defender, an African-American newspaper, and conspicuously collaborated with African American politician and businessman Daniel Jackson.

Ali attended the January 1929 inauguration of Louis L. Emmerson as the 27th governor of Illinois in Springfield, Illinois. The Chicago Defender stated that his trip included "interviews with many distinguished citizens from Chicago, who greeted him on every hand." With the growth in its population and membership, Chicago was established as the center of the movement.

=== Internal split and murder ===
In early 1929, following a conflict over funds, Claude Green-Bey, the business manager of Chicago Temple No. 1, split from the Moorish Science Temple of America. He declared himself the Grand Sheik and took several members with him. On March 15, Green-Bey was stabbed to death at the Unity Hall of the Moorish Science Temple on Indiana Avenue in Chicago.

At the time, Drew Ali was out of town, dealing with former Supreme Grand Governor Lomax Bey (ie, Ezaldine Muhammad, a professor), who had supported Green-Bey's attempted coup. When Drew Ali returned to Chicago, the police arrested him and other members of the community on suspicion of having instigated the killing. No indictment was sworn for Drew Ali at that time.

=== The death of Drew Ali ===
Shortly after his release by the police, Drew Ali died at age 43 at his home in Chicago on July 20, 1929. Although the exact circumstances of his death remain unknown, his death certificate stated that he died from "tuberculosis broncho-pneumonia". Despite the official report, many of his followers speculated that his death was caused by injuries from the police or from other members of the faith. Others thought it was indeed due to pneumonia. One follower told the Chicago Defender: "The Prophet was not ill; his work was done and he laid his head upon the lap of one of his followers and passed out."

=== Succession and schism ===
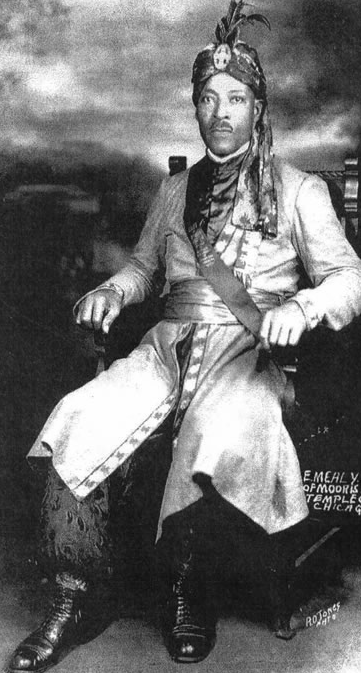
Grand Sheik E. Mealy El in an undated photo, c. 1928

The death of Ali prompted a number of candidates to step forward to succeed him. Edward Mealy El stated that Drew Ali had personally declared him to be his successor. In August, within a month of Drew Ali's death, John Givens El, Ali's chauffeur, declared that he was Drew Ali reincarnated. He was said to have fainted while working on Drew Ali's automobile, and "the sign of the star and crescent [appeared] in his eyes."

At the September Unity Conference, Givens again claimed reincarnation. However, the governors of the Moorish Science Temple of America declared Charles Kirkman Bey to be Drew Ali's successor and named him Grand Advisor.

With the support of several temples each, both Mealy El and Givens El went on to lead independent factions of the Moorish Science Temple. All three factions—formed and led by Kirkman Bey, Mealy El, and Givens El—are active today.

On September 25, 1929, Kirkman Bey's wife reported to the Chicago police his apparent kidnapping by Ira Johnson. Accompanied by two Moorish Science members, the police visited the home of Johnson when they were met by gunfire. The attack escalated into a shoot-out that spilled into the surrounding neighborhood. In the end, a policeman as well as a member were killed in the gun battle, and a second policeman later died of his wounds. The police took 60 people into police custody, and a reported 1000 police officers patrolled Chicago's South Side that evening. Johnson and two others were later convicted of murder.

Kirkman Bey went on to serve as Grand Advisor of one of the most important factions until 1959, when the reins were given to F. Nelson-Bey.

=== Nation of Islam ===
The community was further split when Wallace Fard Muhammad, known within the temple as David Ford-el, also claimed (or was taken by some) to be the reincarnation of Drew Ali. When his leadership was rejected, Ford El broke away from the Moorish Science Temple. He moved to Detroit, where he formed his own group, which would become the Nation of Islam. The Nation of Islam denied any historical connection with the Moorish Science Temple until February 26, 2014, when Louis Farrakhan acknowledged the contribution(s) of Noble Drew Ali to the Nation of Islam and its founding principles.

=== The 1930s ===
Despite the turmoil and defections, the movement continued to grow in the 1930s. It is estimated that membership in the 1930s reached 30,000. There were major congregations in Philadelphia, Detroit, and Chicago.

One-third of the members, or 10,000, lived in Chicago, the movement's center. There were congregations in numerous other cities where African Americans had migrated in the early 20th century. The group published several magazines, including the Moorish Guide National. During the 1930s and 1940s, continued police surveillance (and later the FBI) made the Moors more withdrawn and critical of the government.

=== FBI surveillance ===
During the 1940s, the Moorish Science Temple (specifically the Kirkman Bey faction) came to the attention of the FBI, who investigated claims of members committing subversive activities by adhering to and spreading Japanese propaganda. The investigation failed to find any substantial evidence, and the investigations were dropped. The federal agency later investigated the organization in 1953 for violation of the Selective Service Act of 1948 and sedition. In September 1953, the Department of Justice determined that prosecution was not warranted for the alleged violations. The file that the FBI created on the temple grew to 3,117 pages during its lifetime. They never found any evidence of any connection or much sympathy of the temple's members for Japan.

=== El Rukn connection ===
In 1976, Jeff Fort, leader of Chicago's Black P Stone Nation, announced at his parole from prison in 1976 that he had converted to Islam. Moving to Milwaukee, Fort associated himself with the Moorish Science Temple of America. It is unclear whether he officially joined or was rejected by its members.

In 1978, Fort returned to Chicago and changed the name of his gang to El Rukn ("the foundation" in Arabic), also known as "Circle Seven El Rukn Moorish Science Temple of America" and the "Moorish Science Temple, El Rukn tribe". Scholars are divided over the nature of the relationship, if any, between El Rukn and the Moorish Science Temple of America. Fort reportedly hoped that an apparent affiliation with a religious organization would discourage law enforcement.

=== 1980–2000s ===
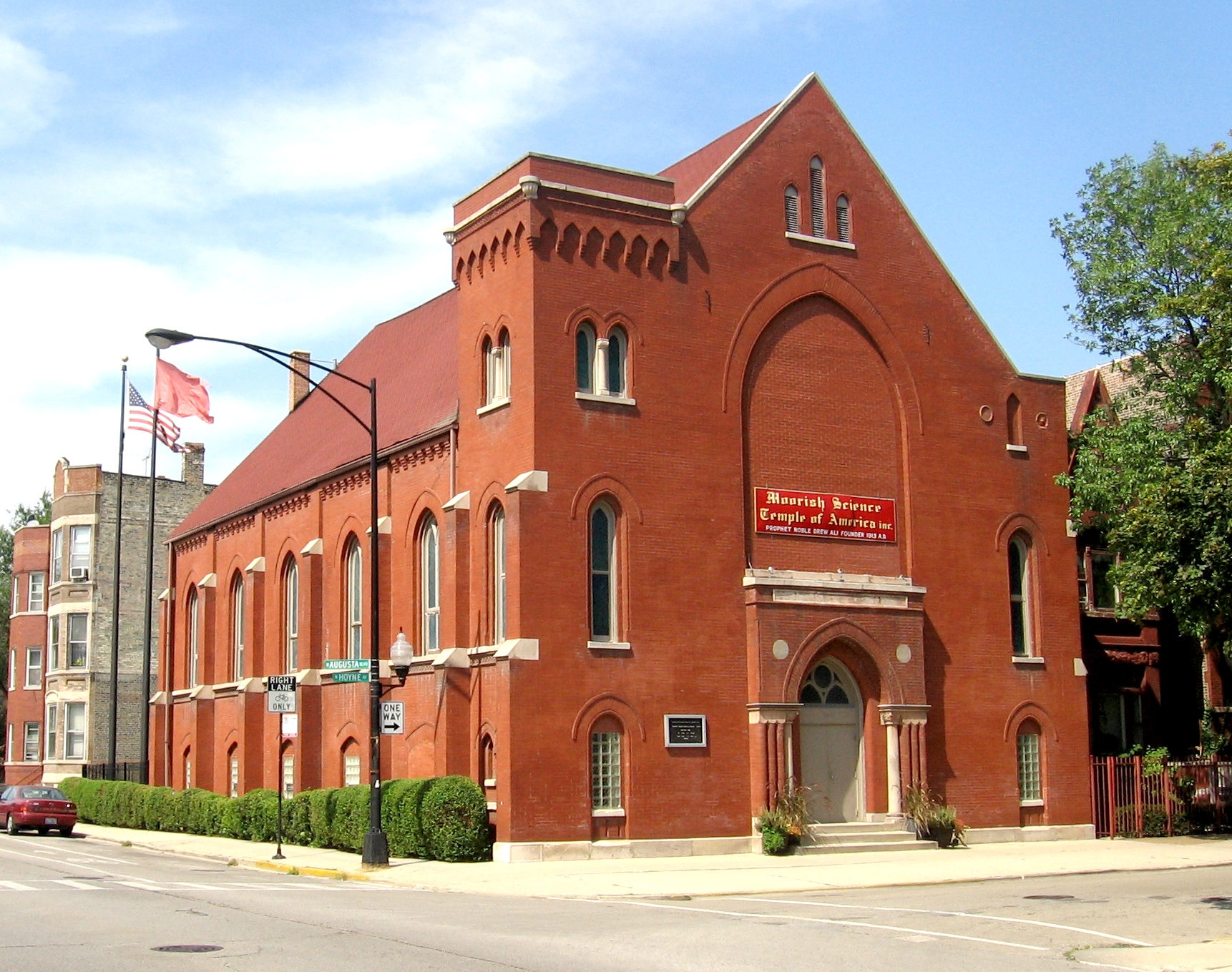
Temple No 9, in Chicago, Illinois

In 1984, the Chicago congregation bought a building from Buddhist monks in Ukrainian Village, which continues to be used for Temple No. 9. Demographic and cultural changes have decreased the attraction of young people to the Moorish Science Temple. Only about 200 members attended a convention in 2007, compared with thousands in the past. In the early 2000s, the temples in Chicago, Philadelphia, Detroit, and Washington, D.C., had about 200 members each, and many were older.

On July 15, 2019, Philadelphia mayor Jim Kenney, as part of a diversity program, proclaimed July 15 to be "Morocco Day". The city mistakenly invited members of the local Moorish Science temple to the ceremony, believing they were of actual Moroccan descent.

An organization with headquarters in Baltimore, Maryland, claiming to be "the only Moorish Science Temple teaching the full National side of the Moorish Movement", is the Moorish Science Temple, with registered business names of the Divine and National Movement of North America, Inc., and Moorish American National Republic.

== Moorish sovereign citizens ==
During the 1990s, some former followers of the Moorish Science Temple of America and the Washitaw Nation formed an offshoot of the sovereign citizen movement, which came to be known as Moorish sovereign citizens. Members believe the United States federal government to be illegitimate, attributing this to a variety of factors, including the dysfunction and racism of the Reconstruction era following the American Civil War and the abandonment of the gold standard in the 1930s. The number of Moorish sovereign citizens is uncertain but estimated to range between 3,000 and 6,000, organized primarily on small groups of several dozen. Moorish sovereign citizens believe black people constitute an elite class within American society, even though much of their underlying ideology originated among white supremacist groups.

The Southern Poverty Law Center classifies Moorish sovereign citizens as an extremist anti-government group. The group's tactics include filing false deeds and property claims, false liens against government officials, frivolous legal motions to overwhelm courts, and invented legalese used in court appearances and filings. Various groups and individuals identifying as Moorish sovereign citizens have used the unorthodox "quantum grammar" created by David Wynn Miller. An article syndicated by the Associated Press states that the Temple has disavowed any affiliation with Moorish sovereign citizens, calling them "radical and subversive fringe groups" and also states that "Moorish leaders are looking into legal remedies." The article also quotes an academic who has been advising authorities on how to distinguish registered Temple members from impostors in the sovereign citizen movement.

== See also ==
- Black Hebrew Israelites
- Five-Percent Nation
- Hoteps
- Moorish Orthodox Church of America, a splinter group
- New religious movement

== General references ==
- Ali, Drew (1928). Holy Koran of the Moorish Science Temple of America. LCCN 2018662631.
- Abdat, Fathie Ali (August 2014). "Before the Fez- Life and Times of Drew Ali 1886-1924" (PDF). Journal of Race, Ethnicity and Religion. 5 (8). Sopher Press: 1–39. Archived from the original (PDF) on October 27, 2014.
- Abu Shouk, Ahmed I.; Hunwick, J. O.; O'Fahey, R. S. (1997). "A Sudanese Missionary to the United States: Sāttī Mājid, 'Shaykh al-Islām in North America,' and His Encounter with Noble Drew Ali, Prophet of the Moorish Science Temple Movement". Sudanic Africa. 8: 137–191.
- Ahlstrom, Sydney E. (2004). A Religious History of the American People (2nd ed.). Yale University Press. ISBN 0-300-10012-4.
- Blakemore, Jerome; Mayo, Yolanda; Blakemore, Glenda (2006). "African-American and Other Street Gangs: A Quest of Identity (Revisted)". In See, Letha A. (ed.). Human Behavior in the Social Environment from an African-American Perspective. Haworth Press. ISBN 978-0-7890-2831-0.
- "Cult Head Took Too Much Power, Witnesses Say". Chicago Tribune. May 14, 1929.
- "Drew Ali, 'Prophet' of Moorish Cult, Dies Suddenly". Chicago Defender. July 27, 1929. p. 1.
- Gardell, Mattias (1996). In the Name of Elijah Muhammad. Duke University Press. ISBN 978-0-8223-1845-3.
- Gates, Henry Louis Jr.; Higginbotham, Evelyn Brooks (2004). "Ali, Noble Drew". African American Lives. Oxford University Press. p. 18. ISBN 978-0195160246.
- Gomez, Michael A. (2005). Black Crescent: The Experience and Legacy of African Muslims in the Americas. Cambridge University Press. ISBN 0-521-84095-3.
- Hamm, Mark S. (December 2007). Terrorist Recruitment in American Correctional Institutions: An Exploratory Study of Non-Traditional Faith Groups Final Report (PDF) (Report). U.S. Department of Justice. 220957.
- Lippy, Charles H. (2006). Faith in America: Changes, Challenges, New Directions. Praeger Publishers. ISBN 978-0-275-98605-6.
- Main, Frank (June 25, 2006). "Dad: Sears Tower suspect under spell of mystery man: But claims of religious ties are puzzling, experts say". Chicago Sun-Times. p. A03.
- McCloud, Aminah (1995). African American Islam. Routledge. ISBN 9780415907859.
- Miyakawa, Felicia M. (January 28, 2024). Five Percenter Rap: God Hop's Music, Message, and Black Muslim Mission. Indiana University Press. ISBN 978-0-253-21763-9.
- Nance, Susan (December 2002). "Respectability and Representation: The Moorish Science Temple, Morocco and Black Public Culture in 1920s Chicago". American Quarterly. 54 (4): 623–659. doi:10.1353/aq.2002.0039. JSTOR 30041944. S2CID 143541638.
- Nash, Jay Robert (1993). World Encyclopedia of Organized Crime. Da Capo Press. ISBN 978-0-306-80535-6.
- Nashashibi, Rami (2007). "The Blackstone Legacy, Islam, and the Rise of Ghetto Cosmopolitanism". Souls. 9 (2): 123–131. doi:10.1080/10999940701382573. S2CID 143981631.
- Paghdiwala, Tasneem (November 15, 2007). "The Aging of the Moors". Chicago Reader. Vol. 37, no. 8. Archived from the original on March 14, 2008.
- Perkins, William Eric (1996). Droppin' Science: Critical Essays on Rap Music and Hip Hop Culture. Temple University Press. ISBN 9781566393614.
- Prashad, Vijay (2002). Everybody Was Kung Fu Fighting: Afro-Asian Connections and the Myth of Cultural Purity. Beacon Press. ISBN 0-8070-5011-3.
- "Religious Cult Head Sentenced For Murder". The Hartford Courant. April 19, 1930. p. 20.
- Scopino, A. J. Jr. (2001). "Moorish Science Temple of America". In Mjagkij, Nina (ed.). Organizing Black America: An Encyclopedia of African American Associations. Garland Publishing. p. 346.
- "Seize 60 After So. Side Cult Tragedy". Chicago Tribune. September 26, 1929. p. 1.
- Shipp, E. R. (December 27, 1985). "Chicago Gang Sues to Be Recognized as Religion". The New York Times. p. A14.
- "Timothy Drew". Religious Leaders of America. Detroit, MI: Gale. 1999.
- "Three Deaths Laid to Fanatical Plot". The Washington Post. September 27, 1929. p. 2.
- Turner, Richard Brent (2003). Islam in the African-American Experience. Indiana University Press. ISBN 0-253-21630-3.
- Wilson, Peter Lamborn (1993). Sacred Drift: Essays on the Margins of Islam. City Lights Books. ISBN 0-87286-275-5.
