= Levi H. Dowling =

American chaplain (1844–1911)

Levi H. Dowling (18 May 1844 – 13 August 1911) was an American preacher who authored The Aquarian Gospel of Jesus the Christ (1908).

== Life ==
He was born in Bellville, Ohio. His father, of Scots and Welsh descent, was a pioneer preacher among the Disciples of Christ. Dowling claimed that at the age of thirteen, in his first public debate, he took the negative side against a Presbyterian elder on "The Everlasting Punishment of the Wicked."

Levi began preaching at the age of sixteen; and at the age of eighteen was pastor of a small church. He entered the United States Army at the age of twenty, as a chaplain, and served in this capacity to the end of the Civil War. In 1866–1867, he was a student at Northwestern Christian University at Indianapolis, Indiana.

The next year he began publishing Sunday school literature, issuing Sunday school lesson papers, song books, and a children's Sunday school paper. Dowling preached President Lincoln's funeral service to Union troops in Illinois. He was the author of two spiritual healing books Self-Culture and Biopneuma: The Science of the Great Breath. The publisher's introduction to Biopneuma says that Levi taught chemistry, toxicology, physiology, histology, and lectured on the use of electricity in medicine.

Much of his time was devoted to the cause of prohibition. He was a graduate of two medical colleges, and practiced medicine for a number of years. He retired from the medical profession to resume literary work.

Even as a child, he was impressed with the sensitiveness of the finer ethers, and believed that in some manner they were sensitized plates on which sounds, even thoughts, were recorded. He studied etheric vibration, determined to solve the great mysteries of the heavens for himself. He claimed to have spent forty years in study and silent meditation, and that he eventually reached a stage of spiritual consciousness that permitted him to enter the domain of the superfine ethers he had referred to, and become familiar with their mysteries. He claimed that during the meditation he was able to repeat events, as many times as necessary, in order to produce a perfect transcript. He said that he spent many months transcribing the events he supposedly witnessed in what he called "The Book of God's Remembrance" or the akashic records. The book he produced from these meditations is commonly known as "The Aquarian Gospel." He claimed to have learned from those visions that the imaginings of his boyhood days were founded upon veritable facts, and that every thought of every living thing is in the akashic record. He claimed that as a boy, he also had a vision in which he was told that he was to "build a white city", and that this vision was repeated three times over a period of years.

Dowling announced a plan for a self-contained community for his religious followers, but it was never accomplished. In 1904, west of Los Angeles, "Mount Carmel-by-the-Sea" was reported to be under development on 800 acres between Hermosa Beach and Redondo Beach, which a company connected with Dowling had purchased for about $65,000. Lots in this 800-acre area were advertised for sale in newspapers. Members received 1-acre lots for housing in the core section called the "White City of the Mystic Initiates", a home for what Dowling called the Gnostic people. Dowling was to be the head instructor in a planned polytechnic high school, which was to have been called "Temple of Resplendent Light". Businesses, factories, water, power, streets, parks, and a top university were expected to follow, but the community was not a success.

== The Aquarian Gospel of Jesus the Christ ==
Dowling wrote The Aquarian Gospel of Jesus the Christ (full title: The Aquarian Gospel of Jesus the Christ: The Philosophic and Practical Basis of the Religion of the Aquarian Age of the World and of the Church Universal) in the late 19th century and published it in 1908. He claimed it was the true story of the life of Jesus, including "the 'lost' eighteen years silent in the New Testament." Dowling claimed to have transcribed it from the Akashic records in the early morning hours from two to six - the absolutely "quiet hours".

The Aquarian Age describes the human race as standing on the cusp of the Piscean-Aquarian Ages. Aquarius is the eleventh sign of the Zodiac, symbolized as a man carrying a pitcher of water.

== Legacy ==
The Aquarian Christine Church Universal, Inc. (ACCU) is a denomination founded on the teachings found in The Aquarian Gospel and other writings by Levi H. Dowling. These include Self-culture and Biopneuma: The Science of the Holy Breath. The church also incorporates other New Age teachings. It is similar to the "I AM" movement and the Ascended Master Teachings.

In a biographical sketch included in the original publication of Self-culture, Levi is said to have taught and lectured medical students in the use of electricity in medicine. The Aquarian Christine Church considers Dowling an Ascended Master.

== See also ==
- The Aquarian Gospel of Jesus the Christ
- Akashic records
- Edgar Cayce
- Clairvoyance
- Esoteric cosmology
- Plane (cosmology)
- Morphogenetic field (Rupert Sheldrake)
- Mindstream
- Terma
- Tertön

== Sources ==
- Levi H. Dowling (1920) [1908]. The Aquarian Gospel of Jesus the Christ (8th ed.). London. OCLC 5813944.
