= Black Muslims =

Black people who are Muslim

Black Muslims and Black Islam denote any black people who are Muslim. This term may be used in reference to:

- African-American Muslims
- Islam in Africa
- Islam in the African diaspora

Historically, the term was specifically used in reference to black nationalist organizations that describe themselves as Muslim. Some of these groups are not considered Muslim by adherents of mainstream Islam. These organizations include:

- Nation of Islam
- Moorish Science Temple of America
- United Nation of Islam
- Five-Percent Nation
- Nuwaubian Nation
- American Society of Muslims

== See also ==
- Islam in the United States
