= Yakub (Nation of Islam) =

Figure in the mythology of the Nation of Islam

Depiction of Yakub from Dwight York's The Holy Tablets, 1996

Yakub (also spelled Yacub or Yaqub) is a figure in the mythology of the Nation of Islam (NOI) and its offshoots. According to the NOI's doctrine, Yakub was a black Meccan scientist who lived 6,600 years ago and created the white race. According to the story, following his discovery of the law of attraction and repulsion, he gathered followers and began the creation of the white race through a form of selective breeding referred to as "grafting" on the island of Patmos; Yakub died at the age of 150, but his followers continued the process after his death. According to the NOI, the white race was created with an evil nature, and were destined to rule over black people for a period of 6,000 years through the practice of "tricknology," which ended in 1914. Yakub is identified with two biblical figures: the patriarch Jacob and John of Patmos from the Book of Revelation.

The story and idea of Yakub originated in the writings of the NOI's founder Wallace Fard Muhammad. Scholars have variously traced its origins in Fard's thought to the idea of the Yakubites propounded by the Moorish Science Temple or to the historical Battle of Alarcos, or alternatively say it may have been created with little basis in any other tradition. Scholars have argued the tale is an example of a black theodicy, with similarities to Gnosticism with Yakub as the Demiurge, as well as the fall of man. It has also been interpreted as a reversal of the contemporary racist ideas that asserted the inferiority of black people. The NOI's interpretation of the biblical Jacob has been criticized for being antisemitic.

The story has, throughout its history, caused disputes within the NOI. Under its current leader Louis Farrakhan, the NOI continues to assert that the story of Yakub is true, not a metaphor, and has been proven by modern science. The NOI splinter groups known as the Nuwaubian Nation, the United Nation of Islam, and the Five-Percent Nation share a belief in Yakub, though the Nuwaubian Nation teaches a distinct version of the myth. The figure of Yakub is not part of mainstream Islam and has been routinely mocked. The story has influenced popular culture from the 1960s onward, particularly hip-hop. Starting in the mid-2010s, Yakub became the subject of ironic Internet memes.

== Summary ==
=== Original version ===
According to the story of Yakub, at the start of human history, a variety of types of black people inhabited the moon; when a black "god-scientist" became frustrated that all those living on the moon did not speak one language, he blew up the moon. A piece of this destroyed moon became the Earth, which was then populated by a community of surviving, morally righteous black people, some of whom settled in the city of Mecca. Yakub was born a short distance outside the city, and was among the third of original black people who were discontented with life in this society. A member of the Meccan branch of the Tribe of Shabazz, Yakub acquired the nickname "big head", because of his unusually large head and arrogance.

At the age of six, he discovered the law of attraction and repulsion by playing with magnets made of steel. He connected this to the rules of human attraction: the "unlike" people would attract, manipulate the original "like" people. By the age of 18, he had finished his education and had learned everything that Mecca's universities had to teach him, and was widely known as a successful scientist. He then discovered that the original black man contained both a "black germ" and a "brown germ", with the brown being the recessive one, and believed that if he could separate them by "grafting", he could graft the brown germ into a white germ. This insight led to a plan to create a new people, who, using tricks and lies, could rule the original black man and destroy them.

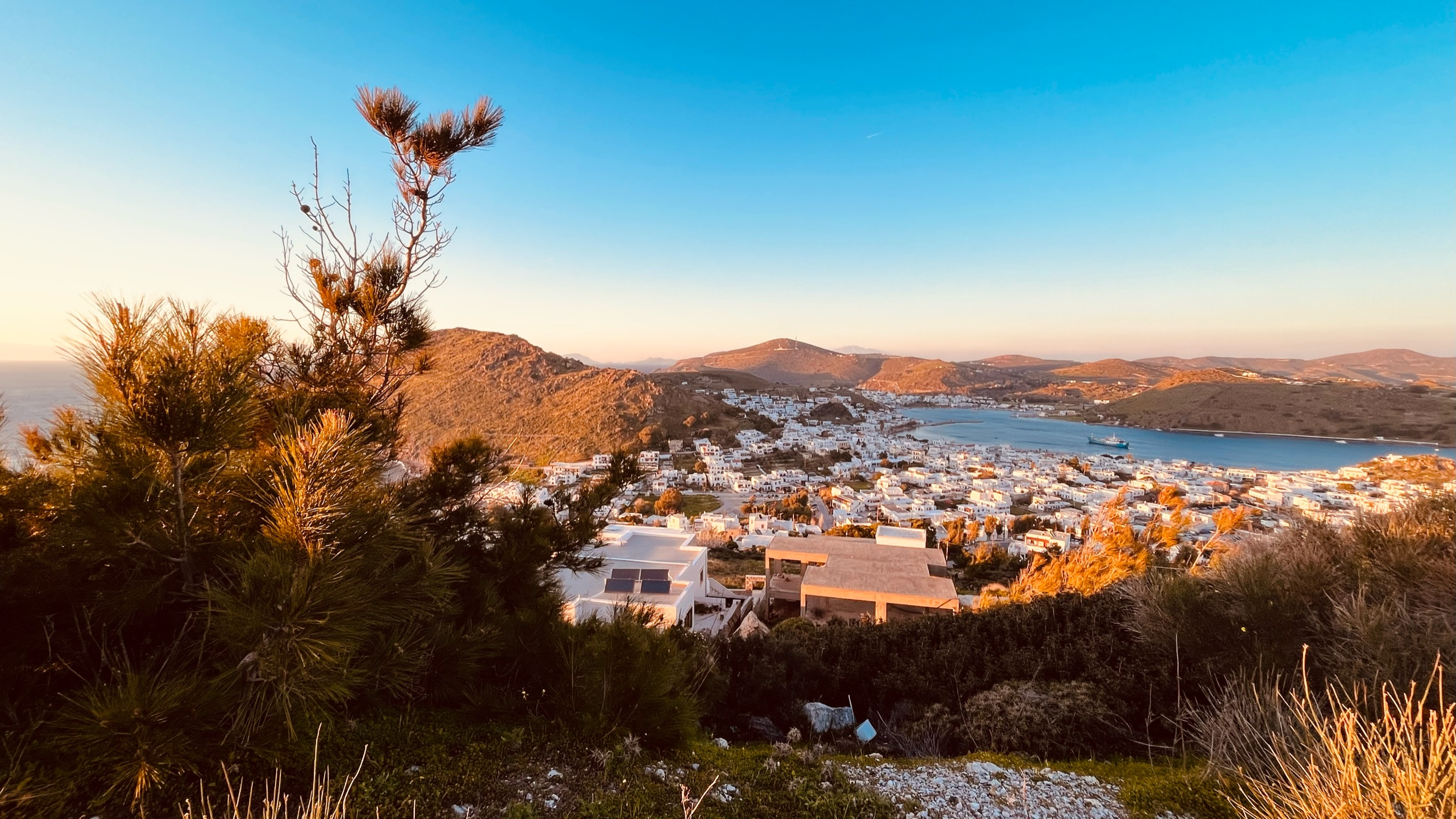
Patmos in 2023

He attracted a following but caused trouble, leading the Meccan authorities to exile him and his 59,999 followers. They then went to an isle in the Aegean Sea called Pelan, which Elijah Muhammad identified as modern-day Patmos. Yakub developed Christianity to fool the black people into supporting him and to trick them into not knowing their true history. Once there, he established a despotic regime, starting to breed out the black traits of his followers. This entailed breeding new children, with those who were too dark being killed at birth and their bodies being fed to wild animals or incinerated. Yakub died at the age of 150, but his followers carried on his work as he passed down his knowledge. After 600 years, the white race was created. All the races other than the black race were by-products of Yakub's work, as the "red, yellow and brown" races were created during the "bleaching" process, with the red germ coming out of the brown, the yellow coming from the red, and from the yellow the white.

The brutal conditions of their creation determined the evil nature of the new race: "by lying to the black mother of the baby, this lie was born into the very nature of the white baby; and, murder for the black people was also born in them—or made by nature a liar and murderer". As a group of people distinct from the Original Asiatic Race, the white race are bereft of divinity, being intrinsically prone to lying, violence, and brutality. According to the Nation's teachings, Yakub's newly created white race sowed discord among the black race, and thus were exiled to live in the caves of Europe ("West Asia"). In this narrative, it was in Europe that the white race engaged in bestiality and degenerated, losing everything except their language. They were kept in Europe by guards. Elijah Muhammad also asserted that some of the new white race tried to become black, but failed. As a result, they became gorillas and monkeys.

To help the whites develop, the ruling Allah then sent prophets to them, the first of whom was Musa (Moses), who taught the whites to cook and wear clothes. Moses tried to civilize them, but eventually gave up and blew up 300 of the most troublesome white people with dynamite. According to the Nation, Jesus was also a prophet sent to try and civilize the white race. However, the whites had learned to use "tricknology": a plan to use their trickery and lack of empathy and emotion to usurp power and enslave the black population, bringing the first slaves to America. According to NOI doctrine, Yakub's progeny were destined to rule for 6,000 years before the original black peoples of the world regained dominance, the end of which was the year 1914.

=== Nuwaubian version ===
An alternative version of the story was told by the Nuwaubian Nation, a black supremacist new religious movement run by Dwight York: this is set out in a roughly 1,700 page book called The Holy Tablets. In the Nuwaubian telling of the Yakub myth, 17 million years before the first of many "intergalactic battles", the ancestors of black people (given a variety of names, including Riziquians) were gods, but subservient to the "Supreme God". Riziquians lived in another galaxy on a planet known as "Rizk", which was located in the "Original Tri-Solar System" which featured a "moveable throne"/spaceship, Nibiru.

In their telling the original protective atmospheric layer of this planet, necessary to protect from the UV rays of its three suns, had been destroyed by an evil being who was the leader of the fallen angels, Shaitan. Shaitan had been asked by the supreme god to move, either off the planet entirely or to a different location on it. He refused, and instead set off an atomic explosion "like an H-bomb", destroying part of the atmosphere. The scientists of the planet were able to repair it with gold, but there wasn't enough gold on the planet, necessitating excursions into space on the Nibiru to mine gold from planet Earth, where colonies were established.

The Riziquians did not want to mine gold, believing it was beneath their status as angels. They spliced genes of Homo erectus with their own genomes, producing humankind to do it for them. Humans originally had various psychic abilities, but after wars and Cain and Abel, the gland responsible for these psychic powers was removed from the human brain by the Riziquians. Yakub was born with two brains (the Nuwaubian explanation for the size of his large head), making him a genius capable of gene-splicing experiments, which resulted in white people. After his experiments were finished, one of his brains exploded, resulting in his death.

== Origins of the story ==
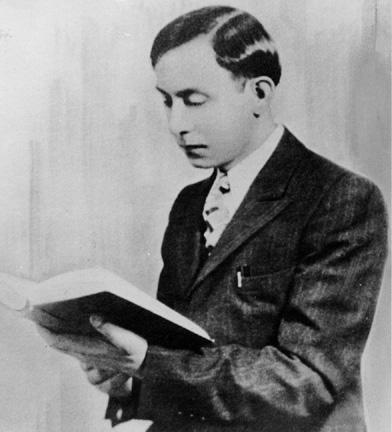
Photo of Wallace Fard Muhammad, the founder of the Nation of Islam, in 1934

The story of Yakub originated in the writings of Wallace Fard Muhammad, the founder of the Nation of Islam, in his doctrinal Q&A pamphlet Lost Found Moslem Lesson No. 2 from the early 1930s. It was developed by his successor Elijah Muhammad in several writings, most fully in a chapter entitled "The Making of Devil" in his book Message to the Blackman in America. The story of Yakub includes Jews as part of a wider artificially created "white" race.

In the Book of Genesis, biblical patriarch Jacob makes a deal with his uncle Laban to divide livestock amongst themselves. The black goats and sheep will belong to Laban, while spotted, speckled or brown goats will belong to Jacob. After Laban agrees, Jacob places wood "with white streaks" in front of the strongest animals during breeding so as to produce spotted offspring. He further uses selective breeding to ensure "the feebler would be Laban's, and the stronger Jacob's". (Note: "Then Jacob took fresh sticks of poplar and almond and plane [or chestnut or sycamore] trees, and peeled white streaks in them, exposing the white of the sticks. He set the sticks that he had peeled in front of the flocks in the troughs, that is, the watering places, where the flocks came to drink. And since they bred when they came to drink, the flocks bred in front of the sticks and so the flocks brought forth striped, speckled, and spotted. And Jacob separated the lambs and set the faces of the flocks toward the striped and all the black in the flock of Laban. He put his own droves apart and did not put them with Laban's flock. Whenever the stronger of the flock were breeding, Jacob would lay the sticks in the troughs before the eyes of the flock, that they might breed among the sticks, but for the feebler of the flock he would not lay them there. So the feebler would be Laban's, and the stronger Jacob's. Thus the man increased greatly and had large flocks, female servants and male servants, and camels and donkeys.") Michael Muhammad Knight opines: "The prominence of Jacob as not only a controller of animal heredity but a selfish, scheming deceiver presents him as a natural candidate for the engineer of the white race".

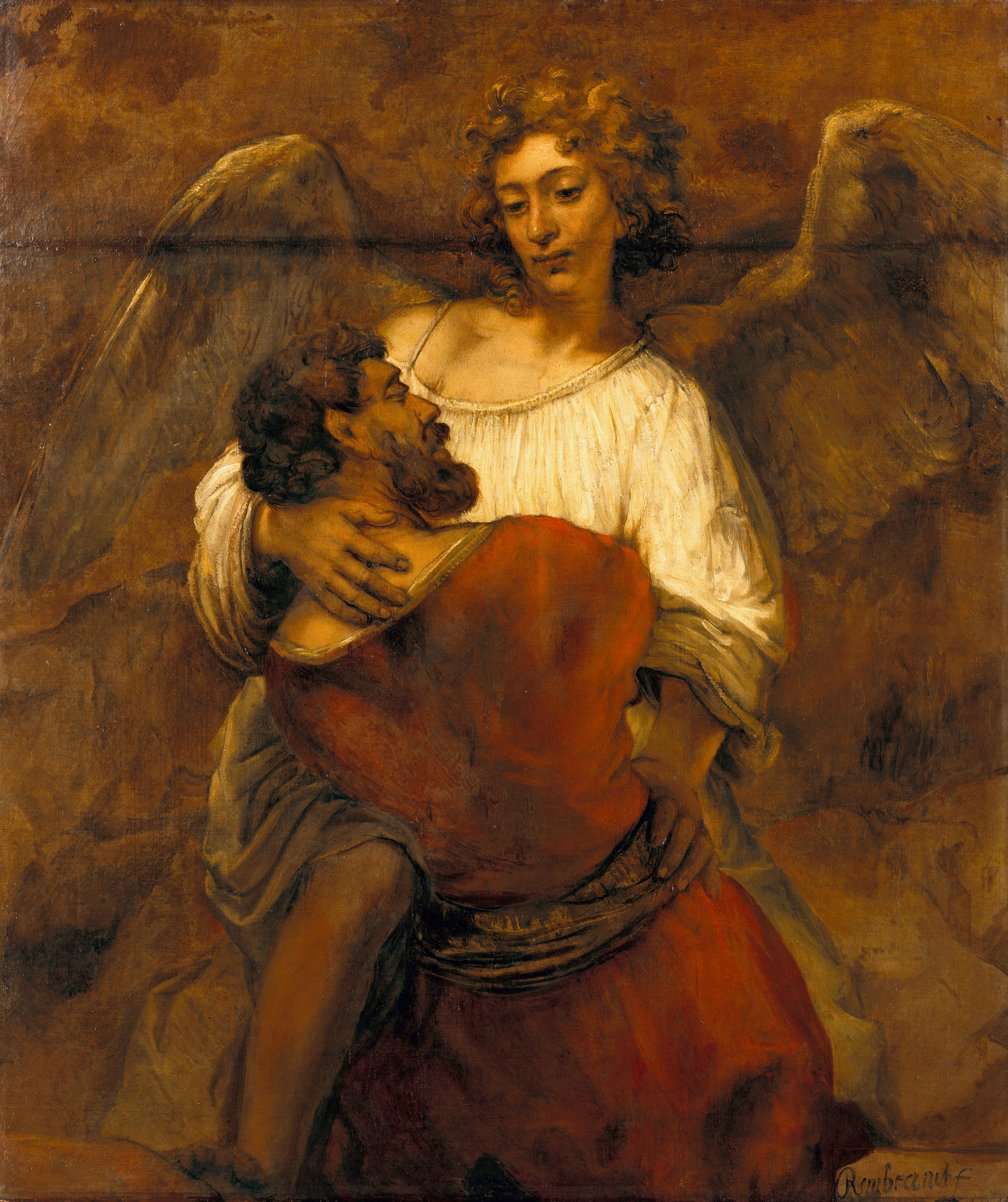
Jacob Wrestling with the Angel (1659) by Rembrandt

In his speeches, Malcolm X completely identified Yakub with the Jacob of Genesis. Referring to the story of Jacob wrestling with the angel, Malcolm X states that Elijah Muhammad told him that "Jacob was Yacub, and the angel that Jacob wrestled with wasn't God, it was the government of the day". This was because Yakub was seeking funds for his expedition to Patmos, "so when it says Jacob wrestled with an angel, 'angel' is only used as a symbol to hide the one he was really wrestling with". However, Malcolm X also states that John of Patmos was also Yakub, and that the Book of Revelation refers to his deeds: "John was Yacub. John was out there getting ready to make a new race, he said, for the word of the Lord".

Ernest Allen argues that "the Yakub myth may have been created out of whole cloth by Prophet Fard". Allen says the Yakub story could conceivably have been influenced by a real historical event during the struggle between Muslims and Christians for control of Spain. Muslim leader Abu Yusuf Yaqub al-Mansur defeated the Franks at the Battle of Alarcos (1195). After the battle, 40,000 European prisoners of war were taken to Morocco to labor on Yaqub's building projects. They were then set free and "allowed to form a valley settlement located somewhere between Fez and Marrakesh. On his deathbed Ya'qub lamented his decision to allow these Shibanis (as they came to be called) to form an enclave on Moroccan soil, thereby posing a potential threat to the stability of the Moorish empire".

Yusuf Nuruddin says that a more direct source was the doctrine of the "Yacobites" or "Yakubites" propounded by Timothy Drew's Moorish Science Temple, to which Fard may have belonged before he founded the NOI. According to Drew, early pre-Columbian civilizations were founded by a West African Moor "named Yakub who landed on the Yucatán Peninsula", whose people evolved into "a race of scientific geniuses with large heads". Drew's followers said this was supported by the large heads of the Olmec colossal heads, which they claimed reflected African features; Nuruddin argues this indicated that the Yakub myth was influenced by the Moorish Science Temple's theology.

Knight comments on the story's partial setting in ancient Greece. He notes that "Scientific journals of the day praised systematized infanticide in ancient Greece as crucial for building a nation and advancing civilization. Fard just took the science of his day and flipped it to inspire the oppressed rather than excuse the oppressors. In Fard's science, eugenics in ancient Greece only made a devil who would rape the earth until his time ran out."

== Role in the Nation of Islam and its offshoots ==
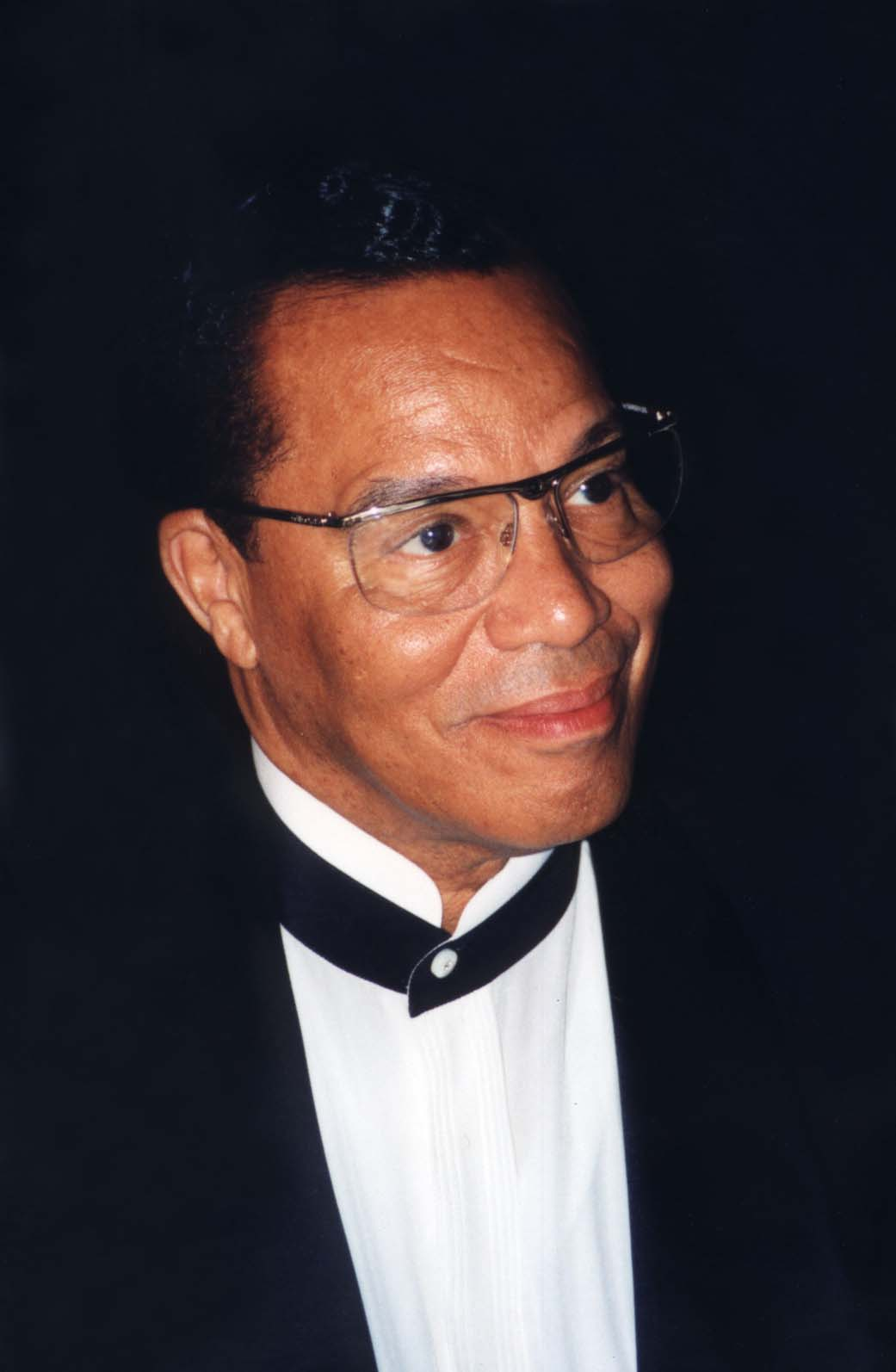
Louis Farrakhan, pictured 1997.

The Yakub story attempts to rationalize "black suffering" through the lens of Islamic theology. Even for those members who refused to take the story literally, it provided a useful metaphor for racial relations and oppression. Elijah Muhammad repeatedly referred to whites as "the devil". The Nation maintains that most white people are unaware of their true origins, but that such knowledge is held by senior white Freemasons.

The doctrine is not present or substantiated in mainstream Islam. As a result, it has led to controversy. In his Autobiography, Malcolm X notes that, in his travels in the Middle East, many Muslims reacted with shock upon hearing about the character of Yakub. When Malcolm founded his own religion organization, Muslim Mosque, Inc., he did not carry over the concept of Yakub.

Louis Farrakhan reinstated the original Nation of Islam, and has reasserted his belief in the literal truth of the story of Yakub. In a 1996 interview, Henry Louis Gates, Chairman of Harvard University's Afro-American Studies Department, asked him whether the story was a metaphor or literal. Farrakhan claimed that aspects of the story had been proven accurate by modern genetic science and insisted that "Personally, I believe that Yakub is not a mythical figure—he is a very real scientist. Not a big-head silly thing, as they would like to say". Farrakhan's periodical The Final Call continues to publish articles asserting the truth of the story, arguing that modern science supports the accuracy of Elijah Muhammad's account of Yakub. The Five-Percent Nation and the United Nation of Islam, both of which are NOI splinter groups, also believe in the Yakub doctrine. Five-Percent Nation founder Clarence 13X took the story in an antiracist direction, taking white disciples.

== Commentary ==
Knight writes that the tale of Yakub has been routinely mocked by outsiders, adding that many people will find Fard's stories difficult to take seriously. Harold Bloom, in his book The American Religion, argues that Yakub combines elements of the biblical God and the Gnostic concept of the Demiurge, saying that "Yakub has an irksome memorability as a crude but pungent Gnostic Demiurge". Nathaniel Deutsch also notes that Fard and Muhammad draw on the concept of the Demiurge, along with traditions of esotericism in biblical interpretation, absorbing aspects of biblical tales to the new narrative, such as the swords of the Muslim warriors keeping the "white devils" from Paradise, like the flaming sword of the angel protecting the Garden of Eden in Genesis. Yusuf Nuruddin also compared the Yakub story to the Genesis story, with the opposing group to the initial utopian society being comparable to the snake in the Garden of Eden. In his view, the story of the later expulsion of Yakub was comparable to the expulsion of Adam and Eve, as well as the fall of man.

Edward Curtis calls the story "a black theodicy: a story grounded in a mythological view of history that explained the fall of black civilization, the Middle Passage from Africa to the Americas, and the practice of Christian religion among slaves and their descendants". Stephen C. Finley also called it a theodicy. Several commentators state that the story, by associating blacks with ancient high civilizations and whites with cave-dwelling barbarians and gorillas, both uses and spectacularly reverses the populist and scientific racism of the era which identified Africans as primitive, or closer to apes than whites. This drew on earlier criticisms of white supremacist Nordicism, creating a mythic version of "attacks on AngloSaxon lineage and behavior that had been voiced by more mainstream black thinkers during the nineteenth century. [...] With these references the [NOI] Muslims replicated the images of European savagery in the Middle Ages that were so pervasive in nineteenth-century black racial thought". XinLing Li sees a contradiction in the story, where blackness is always good but still capable of evil.

Some have taken the story of Yakub as an allegory. Warith Deen Mohammed took his father Elijah Muhammad's teaching about Yakub and his "white devils" to represent a state of mind. Knight has said the story is pseudoscience, but stresses that eugenics was considered science during Fard's epoch. Knight feels the Yakub story is more scientific than the resurrection of Jesus or the claim that Muhammad rode a flying horse to enter paradise to converse with dead prophets. Knight says that the narrative of Yakub was useful for him, as he used it to recon with the social construction of race and white privilege. From that perspective, Knight sees the Yakub myth as "absolutely true." He believes that the meanings of the myth are malleable.

Eunice G. Pollack contextualizes the narrative as part of the Nation of Islam's antisemitism. The NOI claims that Jews were not the chosen people of God, but that black people were. Then, Yakub contrived to take this birthright from the black race and give it to "white Jews", a people he had created. The NOI connects this claim to the biblical story of Jacob taking a birthright away from his brother, Esau. The NOI promises to free descendants of Esau from 4,000 years of Jacob's Satanic power. Pollard opines that scholars and commentators usually fail to recognize antisemitic tropes in the beliefs and theology of the Nation of Islam.

Fredrik deBoer has analyzed Yakub in the context of the Nation of Islam's politics. He argued that the world Yakub created is one where lighter-skinned people want to dominate those who are darker, meaning that "White America seeks to dominate black, Ashkenazic Jews seek to dominate Sephardic, northern Africa seeks to dominate southern. From Yakub stems race, stems racism, stems everything. Because Yakub theory posits racial antagonism as inherent and existential, it leads naturally to racial separatism".

== In culture ==
The American author and playwright Amiri Baraka's play A Black Mass (1965) takes inspiration from the story of Yakub. In Baraka's version, the experiment creates a single Frankenstein-like "white" monster who kills Jacoub and the other magician-scientists and bites a woman, transforming her in a vampiric way into a white-devil mate for himself. From this monstrous couple the white race is descended. According to critic Melani McAlister, "the character of Yakub, now called Jacoub, is introduced as one of three 'Black Magicians' who together symbolize the black origin of all religions". McAlister argues that Baraka turns the Yakub story "into a reinterpretation of the Faust story and a simultaneous meditation on the role and function of art," saying that "As with Faust, Jacoub's individualism and egotism are his undoing, but his failings also signal the destruction of a community." He also compared his version of the story to Frankenstein in its conflation of "the six hundred years of Elijah Muhammad's 'history' into a single, terrible moment of the creation of a monster."

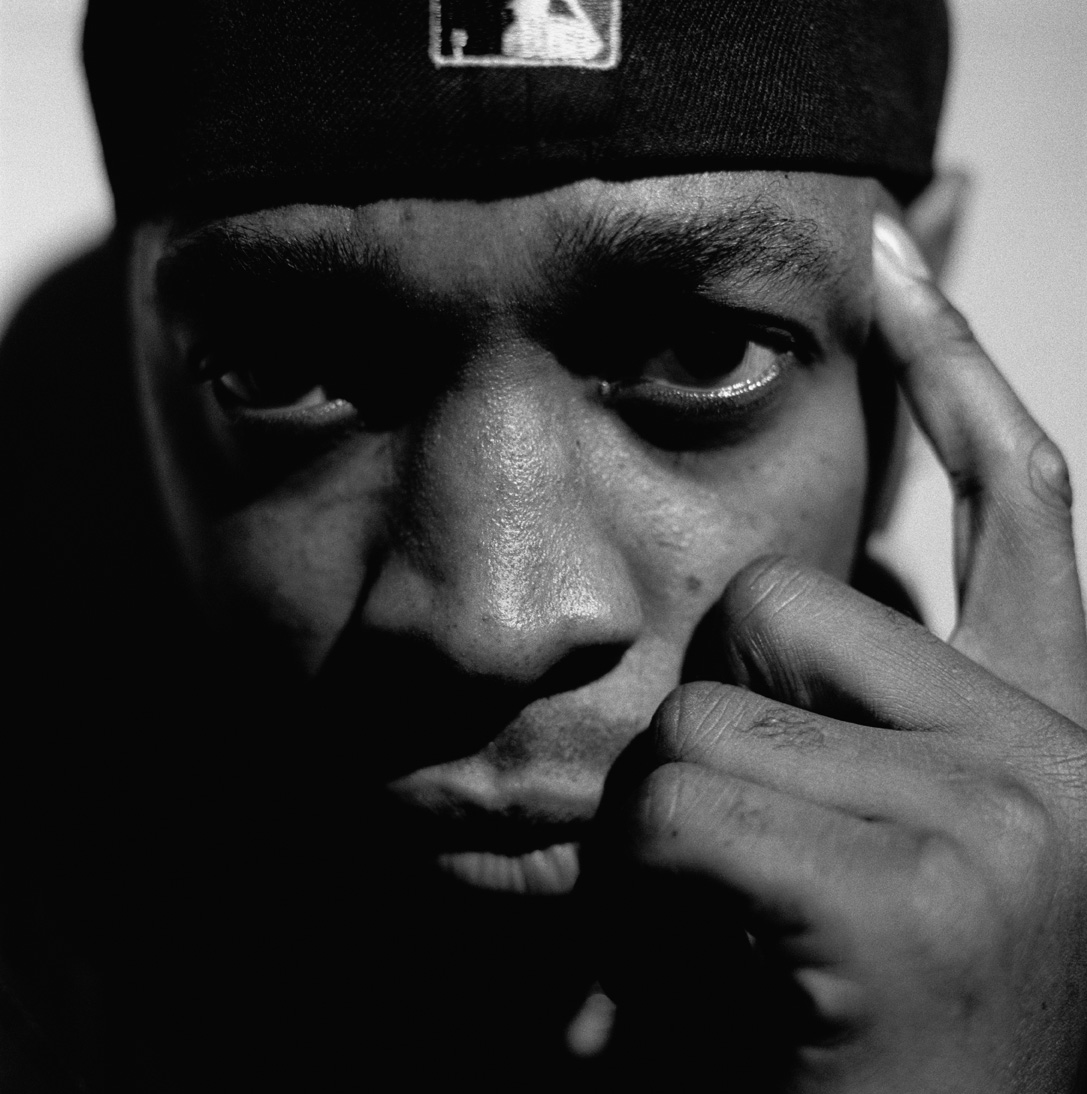
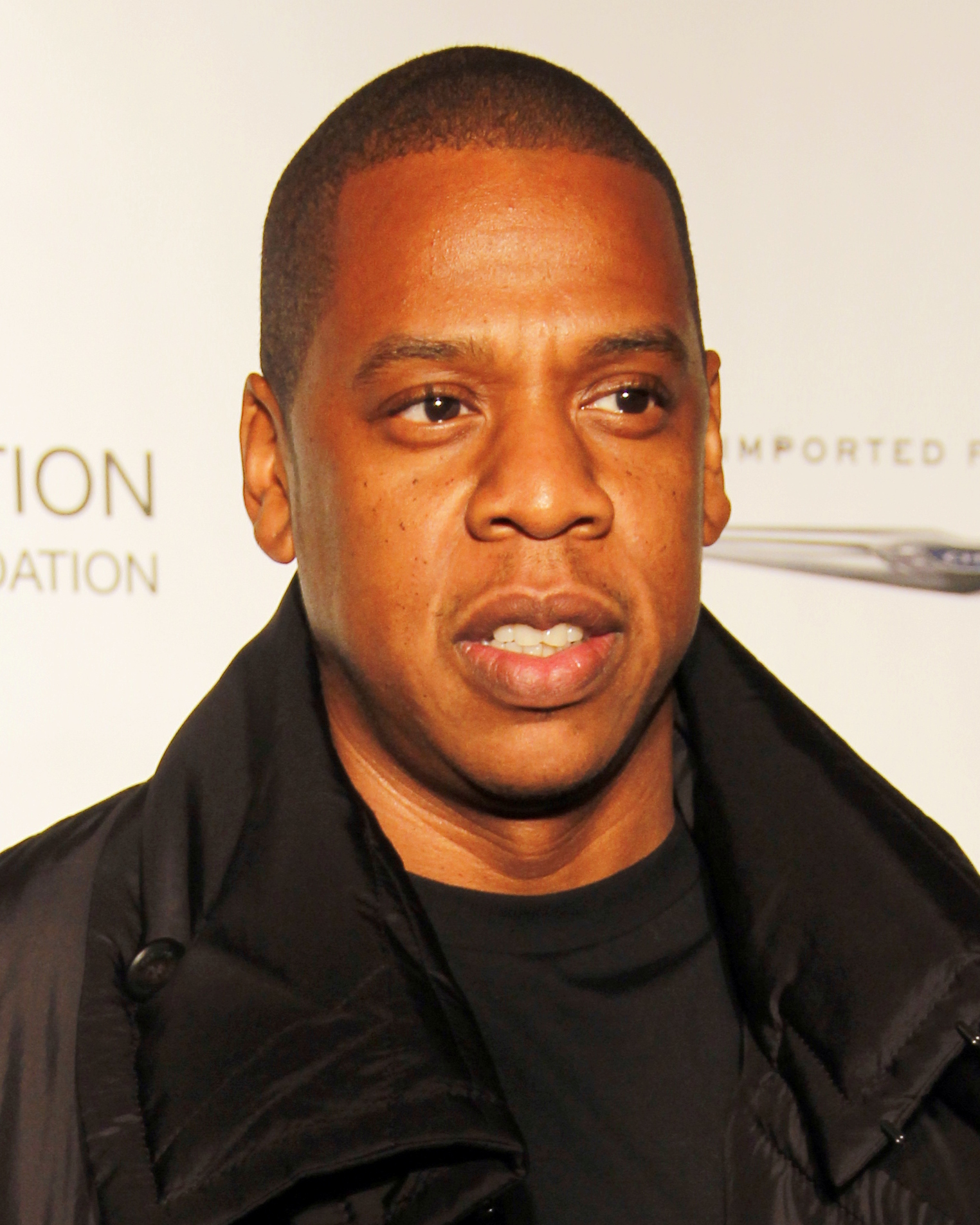
Yakub has been referenced in the music of rappers such as Chuck D (left) and Jay-Z (right).

According to Charise L. Cheney, the doctrine of Yakub has had a significant influence in rap culture, mentioning several rappers. She argues that the rapper Kam (a member of the NOI), in his 1995 song "Keep tha Peace", uses the Yakub doctrine in order to explain black-on-black crime and gang violence in American inner cities, noting the lyrics:

I'm really not knowin' who to blame or fault / for this tension / I mention this gump / Yakub's cavey / the blue-eyed punk / playin' both sides against each other / now that's the real mutha[fucka]

She also notes Grand Puba's 1990 lyric, in which he announces that "his calling was to bring enlightenment to black people and an end to white domination" saying "Here comes the god to send the devil right back to his cave. [...] We're gonna drop the bomb on the Yakub crew". Chuck D of Public Enemy also refers to the story in his song "Party for Your Right to Fight", referring to the Yakub story by attributing the deaths of African American radicals to the "grafted devils" conspiring against the "Black Asiatic Man". In his 2014 freestyle rap "We Made It," a duet with Jay Electronica, Jay-Z raps "I'm ready to chase the Yakub back into caves," meaning that he wants to drive the evil race Yakub created back into the caves from which they originated.

Since the mid-2010s, 4chan began circulating Internet memes of Yakub with a bulbous head that were derived from Nuwaubian visual art. The figure became part of right-wing meme culture. In 2023, cartoonist Frank Edward published a graphic novel called Yakub: The Father of the White Devil Race. His retelling is faithful to the Nation of Islam's myth, but with Yakub reframed as a hero. Knight credits Edward's book with much of the online right's fascination with Yakub. Knight says white supremacists' fascination with the NOI is "curious" but well-established, noting that American Nazi Party leader George Lincoln Rockwell attended NOI events and Wyatt Kaldenberg's encounters with the group led him to seek out an Aryanist religion. References to Yakub have become more prominent on Generation Z social media, to the confusion of older people. Knight cites Yakub's "new life" through memes as an example of "weaponized irony."
