= Tuhuti =

Tuhuti may be:

- an alternative spelling of the name of the Egyptian god Thoth
- genitive of Tuhutum, a Magyar commander serving king Árpád mentioned in the Gesta Hungarorum
- an alias used by black supremacist leader Dwight York
