= The Holy Tablets =

Nuwaubian religious text

- Cover of the first edition
- Author: Dwight York
- Language: English
- Series: Classic Series, Scripture Series
- Publisher: Holy Tabernacle Ministries
- Publication date: 1996
- Publication place: United States
- Pages: 1,707
- OCLC: 44799975

The Holy Tablets is a religious text written by Dwight York, under the name Malachi Z. York. It was first published in 1996 by York's religious movement Holy Tabernacle Ministries, later the Nuwaubian Nation. At over 1,700 pages long, the work contains numerous sagas telling the stories of various religious figures, in a biblical style. It also contains lengthy genealogies of these figures, and full page illuminated illustrations of many of them. Taking influence from Quranist writer Rashad Khalifa, the book has a preoccupation with the number 19, with 19 chapters, each divided into subchapters called "tablets", which each have an amount of verses that is a multiple of 19.

It was the sacred text of the Nuwaubian Nation, collecting many tales told by York in his philosophy of "Right Knowledge". Narratives featured in the book include the creation of mankind, the history of Islam among black people in America, and the history of how "true" Islam was supposedly hijacked by an imposter Muhammad. Many of the stories involve extraterrestrial elements, including various alien races who intervened in Earth's history. Other stories include that of Yakub, a mythical black scientist believed by Nuwaubians to have created the white race, and the eventual defeat and imprisonment of the Shaytan by York. It presents York himself as "the awaited one" and as a savior.

It was written in a time when the Nuwaubian Nation was moving away from Islam, though it does not completely abandon its elements; scholar Michael Muhammad Knight described it as "post-Islamic" in nature. The Nuwaubian Nation released materials and classes designed to help understand the material. It was positioned by York as a successor and fulfillment of the other Abrahamic holy books, as well as the Book of the Dead. York claimed that he had translated The Holy Tablets from Arabic and Nubian "ancient original tablets inscribed in cuneiform". He claimed all other holy books had been working off of these supposed original tablets, but said they had done so inaccurately, and claimed The Holy Tablets was finally an accurate translation, though he later released a revised edition claiming mistakes had been introduced by the book's Christian printers.

== Background and publication history ==
The book was written by Dwight York, under the name Malachi Z. York (for Malachi Zador York). York claimed to be, variously, a prophet, actually God in the flesh, or an extraterrestrial, and published numerous (at least 450) works under a variety of pseudonyms. Many of these publications range from 80 to 600 pages. York was the founder of the Nuwaubian Nation, first founded in 1967, which went by several different names; after The Holy Tablets was published, the organization was renamed the Nuwaubian Nation, after the Nuwaubu term used in the book (used to refer to the way of life of supreme beings). The group had Muslim beliefs, but grew to abandon them, though did not entirely. The group has been described as a cult.

It was published in 1996 by Holy Tabernacle Ministries in Eatonton, Georgia. York claimed it was created to give his followers "guidance from this to the next world and on". It has been republished in various editions; Nuwaubians created a variety of classes and study guides designed to help the reader understand the material. Nuwabian publications are categorized into 16 loose series, with The Holy Tablets in both the "Classic Series" and "Scripture Series", though it is unclear when they started this method of categorization, and many books including The Holy Tablets lack in-publication data including date of authorship.

York claimed the work was a successor to the Torah, the New Testament, the Quran, and the Ancient Egyptian Book of the Dead, and a successor to W. D. Fard's the Problem Book and the Circle Seven Koran. York said other holy books had been "plagiarized" and "adulterated", claiming his mission was to restore the revelations of the Eloheem to their original. York claimed The Holy Tablets was translated from" the original Arabic and Nubian scripture" that was written on "the ancient original tablets inscribed in cuneiform", which had been used by earlier prophets to write their scripture, with each (the Torah, New Testament, and the Quran) successively getting further from the "original". York said that The Holy Tablets was finally the pure, original version of these tablets. However, the front page of the book calls him "the receiver", not "the translator". A later revised edition was claimed by York to contain improvements to the text and said that he had corrected errors supposedly introduced by the first edition's Christian printers; Nubians as used in the original was changed to "Nuwaubians".

In 2002, York was arrested, and in 2004 he was sentenced to an 135-year federal prison sentence for racketeering and several counts of child molestation, among other crimes.

== Style and contents ==
The Holy Tablets is over 1,700 pages long, 1,707 in one printing, with nineteen chapters each divided into several subchapters, called "tablets", and verses. The end sections include a glossary and list of figures. It is printed on thin Bible paper, and in a format similar to the Bible. York's portrait marks the first page, where he is declared "the receiver". While produced in a context where the Nuwaubian Nation was moving away from Islam, The Holy Tablets still incorporates many of these elements and does not erase that history. The chapter titles reflect Arabic vocabulary, narratives and references. It also attempts to rebut black Jewish groups (this itself relating to the shift in the organization's adherence to Islamic and Jewish beliefs). Some earlier chapters, written in the early 1990s, show markers of the organization's "Jewish period", instead referring to York as "Rabboni Y'shua Bar El Haady". Taking influence from Quranist writer Rashad Khalifa, the book has a preoccupation with the number 19, with 19 chapters and each tablet having an amount of verses that is a multiple of 19.

It largely compiles the narratives and teachings propounded by York altogether making up his philosophy of "Right Knowledge". The book contains numerous sagas covering many mythic and biblical events. It also contains lengthy genealogies of the figures mentioned in these tales, both heroes and villains, some extraterrestrials. The book contains numerous full page illuminated illustrations of these figures, which are dispersed within the text; these portraits "counter[...] the whitewashing" of many of the figures depicted (e.g. Jesus, Moses, Adam). In the book, York connects himself as a savior to other black Americans viewed as "saviors" (e.g. Marcus Garvey, Noble Drew Ali, Elijah Muhammad, Eldridge Cleaver) comparing himself to these people in a way used to reinforce his claims of charisma.

== Summary ==
The stories involve ancient astronauts, "extraterrestrial holy wars", and intergalactic battles. At the beginning it gives a "new" dua (Muslim prayer). The opening pages also serve as a sort of family bible for recording events like marriages, deaths, births, special events, etc.

The first chapter, "El Khalqu, the Creation", covers the creation of mankind. The universe was created by the "Nine ether", a powerful mixture of all gases in nature. This force created the universe and is said to be the "most potent power in all the boundless universes". The three phases of mankind's creation are given as the original or primary creation (with subatomic energy originating), then secondary or "evolutionary creation" (described as the "evolving of existence from density to matter to atoms to cells, to organisms, to bodies") and the final stage of tertiary or "ghostational creation", where consciousness was created. The first peoples were the Nuwaubians (also called Melanin-ites, or Moors); out of the moors there emerge other species of man. Whites are created by Yakub (spelled Yaaquub), a mythical black scientist who in the Nuwaubian belief was said to have created the white race. York portrays "whiteness" as being tied to weakness, both physical and spiritual, calling it "Albinism, a curse which was given to Canaan and his descendants, [...] a sign of recessive or weak genes"; in comparison, melanin is called "the same thing that colors this planet Qi, now called Earth".

York gives a millenarian end of times prophecy, where "supreme beings" called either "Annunagi" or "Neteru" would arrive on Earth and bring them to the stars, bringing them back to their status as supreme beings; York predicted this would happen in 2003 with the return of the ship Nibiru, with the last possible time being 2043. Many stories involve extraterrestrial elements: for example, the tablets claim the Dogon people of Mali are descended from Ancient Egyptians who hybridized with the Nommos, a reptilian alien species who fled the Sirius B system after Nibiru collapsed it after destroying their star. Other peoples and extraterrestrial races include the Anu, the Draconians (also called the Dragon People/Snake People), and the Rizqiyians. Many aliens intervened in Earth's history, with Adolf Hitler said to be connected to an ancient alien race of "Aryan beings" called the Pleidians from Aldebaran, the treacherous enemies of the Rizqiyians. The Pleidians who gave him flying saucers and powerful technology; York claims that Hitler, a demon, had been orchestrating a selective breeding program for these aliens. A threat is declared to be the "Leviathan" race, which would form the greatest threat to the Nuwaubians. York described this people as a race where "you can't tell their nationality" that was formed through racial mixing.

The second chapter, "El Abd, the Slaves", follows a narrative of Islam among black Americans in the 20th century, discussing figures like Noble Drew Ali, Wallace Fard Muhammad, Clarence 13X and Elijah Muhammad. Elijah Muhammad is acknowledged as York's predecessor, who York describes as "the third Elijah sent to prepare the way for myself, Malachi ... the Elijah for this day and time" (the first being Elijah the Tishbite and the second being John the Baptist). Fard is portrayed as a Venusian "'god' from Saudi Arabia". This begins as a conventional sīrah of Muhammad. It then claims that the Devil (Shaytan) created his own imposter Muhammad (connected to the imposter Musaylima), who then went on to found "Muhammadism" which had among its attributes "corrupted set of laws called shariya, laws made by man, not found in the real Al Quraan", "the demon Al Hadith" and the "system called Fiqh, rules and regulations".

It accuses the Quran of being fake, created by this false prophet: "these false teachings of the so-called Arabs who deliberately mistranslated verses of the Qur'aan to confuse non-Arabic speaking Nubians in the west", and that a "Jewish-Catholic conspiracy" had enabled this, leading the real Muhammad to be assassinated by a Jewish woman, taking over the original Islam and resulting in almost all followers of Islam being followers of this illegitimate religion. The secret original Quran was passed on only through Muhammad's daughter Fatima, who secretly passed on an original copy, which was brought to Sudan and was "protected and never translated into any foreign language until now". It says that as a result "Al Mahdi" [York] set up a system of 19 tests in 1991 that would bring forth adherents to "the Mecca of Nubians, Georgia" and York's mission is to "reform all the false teachings that had been taught to Nubians in the west and restore Islaam to its pristine purity". Other teachings in the book include that both love and hate are necessary, and that "to be deprived of the other is to be crippled as a bird with only one wing".

It declares York "the awaited one", and presents him as a savior. It gives claimed details on York's origins, claiming he is of extraterrestrial origin. York claims that he is "from Rizq the eighth planet in the nineteenth galaxy Illyuwn, far outside of this one. I am sent here to give you the true guidance". It gives a history of the Nuwaubian Nation itself, aiming to provide a whole narrative of the group and its origins. The eventual defeat of Shaytan (in the form of a reptile), bound on the planet Titan by the figure Murdock/Melchisidek (another name for York) is depicted. The final chapter, "Al Khidr, Murdoq", gives a chronology of the Islamic faith.

== Analysis and legacy ==
The Holy Tablets was the Nuwabian Nation's bible and sacred text. Religious studies scholar Spencer Dew noted it as "a sprawling text that serves as a synthetic culmination of the movement's many phases", while scholar Yusuf Nuruddin described the book as containing "seemingly endless" "sagas, written in faux Biblical style" and "faux genealogies". It was presented by the movement as the "last chance of salvation", and within the movement they were seen as divinely inspired works made for them, sent by god to correct the errors of the "Judeo-Christian-Islamic writings". York declared it "scripture that is divinely inspired that will bring about a long overdue change", and that these supposed original tablets had been "by far the greatest of all, for it contains all they were trying to express but couldn't, because they didn't have the whole truth and all the facts". In this, York claimed that all other sacred texts were outdated. The official website of the book stated that:

The Koran Has not changed the World, nor Has the Torah or the New Testament. They have Done Nothing for us the Nubians but were Used to Enslave Us, So the Most High and His Heavenly Hosts Have Decided that It Was Time to Renew the Nubian History. It is Time for the Nubians to have their Own Scripture for their Spiritual Upliftment and Guidance

The tablets were meant to be read in a specific way, for example, one was not supposed to do anything that would hinder their "overstanding" (Note: "Overstanding" is a Nuwaubian term meant to designate a kind of superior understanding by Nuwaubians.) of the text while reading, like eating. It was said they must be read with clarity of mind and heart. York said "do Not Read the Holy Tablets while Angry, for the Information that is Within the Confines of its Pages are Given to You in Order to Break this Evil Hypnotic Spell of Spiritual Ignorance and Racial Blindness!!!" It was recommended that they be read daily if the adherent was able, especially with family to get collective understanding; however it was said to be impossible for a human to fully understand the tablets "because their time zone is much greater than your ability to comprehend at this point". The group advertised it as "the scripture for this day and time", which was intended to fulfill past scripture but not supersede it. Violation of the tablets was the fifth violation of the Nuwaubian belief system.

The book links earlier scriptures (Christian, Jewish, Islamic, Egyptian, Mesopotamian) with millenarian beliefs, linking old to new prophecies through York. Michael Muhammad Knight said of the work that it signified the movement's "graduation" from Islam, but also "the fulfilled promise of Elijah Muhammad"; Elijah Muhammad had, according to York, mentioned a "future scripture" that would replace the Bible and Quran. Knight also noted that it depicts the journal of York as eventually coming full circle "to end where it started, as a teacher of Sufism wearing a fez". He called the text "post-Islamic" in nature, but noted that it still echoed and incorporated many Islamic elements. He noted it contains many anti-Islamic tropes, presenting Islam as both a strategy to reach York's students and a corrupted tradition in need of restoration.

El Kulum ("The All"), a concept from the book, is referenced in the MF Doom song "Cellz" from his 2009 album Born Like This: "DOOM from the realm of El Kulum smelly gel fume". El Kulum is the force in The Holy Tablets credited with giving "supreme beings" their powers. It was also used by the National Black Foot Soldiers Network, who share beliefs with the Nuwaubians. Members of the group interpreted real world events, like the bombing of the World Trade Center and a power outage in August 2003, as fulfilling the prophecies in the book.
