= United Nation of Islam =

1978 offshoot of the Nation of Islam

The United Nation of Islam (UNOI) is a Black American new religious movement based in Kansas City, Kansas. It was founded in 1978 as an offshoot of the Nation of Islam by Royall Jenkins, who continued to be the group's leader until he died in September 2021 of complications resulting from COVID-19. He styled himself "Royall, Allah in Person". Since its founding, the group has undergone numerous name changes and is currently known as the Value Creators.

== History ==
The United Nation of Islam was established by Solomon Muhammad, who declared that he was Allah.

Royall Jenkins was born in 1942 in South Carolina and grew up in eastern Maryland, later moving to New York and then Chicago, while working as a long-distance truck driver delivering publications of the Nation of Islam (NOI). He remained a member until after the death of Elijah Muhammad but split from the organization in 1978. According to Jenkins, he spent time on a spaceship with angels, where he learned that he was the Supreme Being and how to govern the world.

Public records show Jenkins working as a truck driver and living mostly with friends as he tried to recruit followers, including his daughter Maureen, who joined him in 1985 in a house in Waldorf, Maryland. The house was rented for them by Joseph Kelly, one of Jenkins' first converts. The UNOI eventually grew, and was incorporated as a nonprofit organization in New Jersey in 1993. Between 1996 and 2002, the group relocated to its current Kansas City location.

Among those to join were several members of the NOI who had been close to its leader, Elijah Muhammad. These included Elijah's brother, John Muhammad, and his former national secretary, Abass Rassoull.

== Beliefs ==
The beliefs of the UNOI are based on the beliefs of the NOI along with considerable modifications by Jenkins. While believing that Allah came in the person of Wallace Fard Muhammad, the founder of the NOI, Jenkins claims that he himself is Allah in his own person, who is more powerful and is given the task of coercing the submission of all things and perfecting everything which is used to magnify him, after which men will all be God or gods.

Jenkins stresses the relationship between different races and sexes, extensively referring to the Black man, the Black woman, and the white man. Black men are said to be the real and original men, whereas white people are claimed to have been created by a scientist named Yakub 6,000 years ago, the same belief held, at least in a metaphorical sense, by followers of the NOI prior to the death of Elijah Muhammad. Jenkins also claims that Black men created Black women as a natural pleasure, that women are inferior, and that following female guidance leads to Hell. He believes that Black women are in league with white men, whom he considers enemies, and condemns women seeking child support, custody, and alimony through courts.

Jenkins also claims that the current NOI has been led astray by its leader Louis Farrakhan, whom he asserts is the most "formidable enemy of Allah," and that Farrakhan uses tricks and deceptive tactics to "silence anyone else's voice" and "prepare the masses to fight for him," through appearing "to be against the Whiteman [sic] and his government."

== Operations ==
Members of the UNOI work as unpaid labor in various businesses owned by the organization. UNOI-owned businesses include a full-service gas station (Your Gas Station), several restaurants and bakeries, a sewing factory, an urgent-care medical facility (Your Colonic Center) and a construction company, among others. UNOI claims that it provides for all the needs of all full-time volunteers. The group has roughly 200 full-time members in Kansas City, with perhaps 300 spread across several other cities. Most of the latter are part-time.

After moving to Kansas City in 1996 (although its headquarters was not moved there until 2001), the UNOI received commendations for apparently aiding in the renewal of an area along Quindaro Boulevard that had a reputation for high crime rates and as a slum. The group purchased several properties in the area at minimal prices and used them to house its various businesses. Commendations extended to the Wyandotte County government donating several additional (vacant) buildings to UNOI.

== Controversies ==
=== UNOI statements ===
Critics of the UNOI note that members work for Jenkins' benefit in UNOI businesses and receive no income, apply for and receive welfare from the government, and are given only the minimal necessities for survival, while UNOI uses the funds for their own benefit (including free vacations in the Caribbean). UNOI members and their children are required to be educated by the UNOI, which does not instruct them in many basic skills or provide opportunity for accredited higher education. Members receive no health insurance and are not permitted to receive medical care outside that offered by the UNOI at Your Colonic Center, which does not include any physicians licensed in Kansas. At least one child of UNOI members has died without being taken to Kansas City emergency medical services.

=== Jenkins family ===
Jenkins has taken several wives from among his followers, including a teenaged stepdaughter (after having impregnated her). From these unions, he has fathered at least 15 children. Jenkins claims that he is justified in practicing polygamy, comparing himself to Solomon and claiming "In the near future, a man will be known for his wisdom according to the number of wives that he has."

Notable among the UNOI's critics are at least ten former members, including Moreen and Hanif Jenkins, two of Royall Jenkins' children from his first marriage. Hanif was a member of the UNOI for six months and then became a critic of its operations. Moreen joined the UNOI in 1985. She claimed that she married Joseph Kelly, one of the first members of the UNOI, and also studied UNOI theology for several hours a day for years. In 1997, Royall Jenkins declared that Kelly was a reincarnation of Elijah Muhammad, a claim that the NOI rejected. In 2002 Moreen Jenkins claimed her father threatened her life and the life of her youngest child after she attempted to apologize to the victim of a beating by UNOI members. She then took her infant child and left UNOI. Members continued to harass her. She stated that the UNOI was blocking her attempts to communicate with her other children and her attempts to gain custody. As of 2003, she had filed for divorce and still sought custody of her children. Moreen died at her home on October 14, 2008, shortly after her 45th birthday.

In 2003, the UNOI stated that Moreen Jenkins was "operating out of vengeance, scorn, anger, desire and treachery" and proposed that she seduced reporters with "the guise of a scoop." In the same statement, Royall Jenkins is quoted as announcing "the time when those who conspire against the rise of the Blackman—including Black women—will no longer be tolerated." After her death, Jenkins described his daughter as a traitor, stated "the death of my daughter Moreen was more than justified" and exhorted his followers not to mourn.

=== Human trafficking ===
In September 2017, Kendra Ross filed a lawsuit in the U.S. District Court of Kansas which alleged she had been forced to work without pay in businesses run by the UNOI and live in their homes for 10 years; was forcibly separated from her mother at age 12; ordered to marry another group member at age 20; and shipped against her will to various cities in different states before she escaped the group at age 21. In May 2018, after the group and its founder Royall Jenkins failed to respond to Ross's lawsuit, the Kansas District Court entered a default judgment awarding Ross nearly $8 million in damages, which is thought to be the largest amount ever awarded in a human-trafficking case in U.S. history.

In June 2018, the United Nation of Islam was profiled on A&E's Cults & Extreme Belief, a television show where host Elizabeth Vargas and others interview former members of organizations considered cults, talking to them about how they became involved and their allegations of abuse. In the episode, former members talk about their allegations of human trafficking, neglect and abuse, and unpaid labor of children in the group.

In September 2024, six former high ranking members of the cult were convicted of conspiracy to commit forced labor by a Kansas federal court.

== Reception ==
According to Vibert L. White Junior, the United Nation of Islam was "perhaps the boldest" of the various NOI splinter groups "in confronting the teachings of Farrakhan".

== See also ==
- African-American Muslims
- Five-Percent Nation
