= Nuwaubian Nation =

Black American new religious movement

Flag used by the Nuwaubian Nation, featuring a Star of David and an Ankh

The Nuwaubian Nation, Nuwaubian movement, or United Nuwaubian Nation (/nuːˈwɔːbiːən/) is an American religious organization founded by Dwight York circa 1967. Since then the group has repeatedly changed its name, teachings and practices. Scholars of religion have characterized it as a new religious movement and a black nationalist group. The group has also repeatedly claimed ancestry and figures from Egyptians, Nubians, Ancient Israelites, and Moors.

Drawing on a wide range of sources, Nuwaubian beliefs are eclectic and have changed over time. York—who promoted his teachings through writings called "scrolls"—initially claimed to be the grandson of Muhammad Ahmad, the 19th-century Sudanese Mahdi. He later claimed to be an extraterrestrial named Yaanuwn. Although it has promoted references to "Allah" and "God", its teachings are materialistic, dismissing the existence of a spiritual realm. Race is a key part of its black nationalist worldview, which focuses on African Americans especially. White people are regarded as having a fundamentally separate origin. The group is millenarian, with York prophesying that an apocalypse in the 2000s would see the righteous 144,000 be saved. Many of the movement's teachings revolve around the use of Nubic, a language which York developed.

York had a background in Sunni Islam but established his own group, initially called the Ansaar Pure Sufi, in New York City around 1967. By 1969 the group had been renamed the Nubian Islamic Hebrew Mission in America and by 1973 the Ansaaru Allah Community. Establishing a commune in Brooklyn with its own security force, the group presented itself as being Islamic but faced much opposition from other Muslim organizations in the city. Over the following years it integrated ideas from New Age and UFO religions, with York announcing that he was an extraterrestrial. In 1992 York transformed his movement into the Holy Tabernacle Ministries, increasingly foregrounding Jewish themes. The following year, it became the United Nuwaubian Nation of Moors and relocated to Georgia, where it began claiming to be a Native American nation and established Tama-Re, an Ancient Egypt-themed compound and tourist attraction. The movement also incorporated sovereign citizen concepts. In 2004, York was convicted of child molestation, racketeering and fraud, receiving 135 years in federal prison. Although Tama-Re was demolished and group membership declined, the movement has survived as the United Sabaeans Worldwide.

Over the course of its history, the Nuwaubian movement has attracted thousands of followers, with estimates suggesting that core support has peaked at around 500 members in any given period. It has also exerted an influence on a number of African American musicians. The movement has faced much scrutiny from U.S. law enforcement, journalists, the anti-cult movement, Muslim organizations and the Southern Poverty Law Center (SPLC), which have varyingly accused it of being a black supremacist hate group, cult and criminal enterprise.

== Definition ==
During their history, the Nuwaubians have operated under various names, with the sociologist of religion Susan Palmer referring to the group, in its different institutional forms, as "the Nuwaubian movement". Similarly changing have been its use of symbols and the clothing worn by its members. Another sociologist of religion, David V. Barrett, noted that the group's development was "complex and (certainly for outside observers) muddled". The Nuwaubian movement draws influence from the Hebrew Bible, the New Testament, and the Quran, in addition to elements from UFO beliefs, Black Freemasonry, the writings of Edgar Cayce and Patriot movement conspiracy theories. Palmer believed that the movement's teachings became more eclectic in their influences as it aged.

Although the various changes that the Nuwaubian movement has undergone throughout its history mean that it defies easy categorization, scholars of religion have classified it as a new religious movement. The movement emerged within the context of American black nationalism, with the scholar of religion Kathleen Malone O'Connor arguing that it was best understood in "the black prophetic, millennial, and messianic traditions" of the Moorish Science Temple, the Nation of Islam, and the Five Percent Nation of Gods and Earths. Palmer also situated it within a broader "Black cultic milieu", through which it interacted with the Nation of Islam, Rastafari, and the Black Hebrew Israelites.

From the late 1960s through to the late 1980s, the movement presented itself as Islamic—although its interpretation of Islam would be considered heretical by mainstream Muslims—while in the early 1990s it was often characterized as going through a Jewish phase. By the 2000s, various scholars of religion were describing it as a UFO religion, and it also absorbed influences from the sovereign citizen movement and was classified as a Moorish sovereign citizen group. During the 1990s, founder Dwight York spoke retroactively about the various phases as representing different "schools" through which he and his followers had progressed.

== History ==
=== Dwight York and the Ansaar Pure Sufi ===
York claimed to have been born in Sudan on June 26, 1945. A Federal Bureau of Investigation (FBI) report accepts this birthdate but maintains that York was born in Maryland. The Muslim heresiologist Bilal Philips believed that York was actually born in 1935, but later claimed to be younger so that his birth might fit a particular Muslim prophecy about the Mahdi. In early life, York was exposed to religions claiming an Islamic identity; according to one claim, he was involved in the Moorish Science Temple, a black-oriented American new religion. During part of his teens and early twenties, York was also involved with the State Street Mosque, a Sunni Muslim establishment in New York City run by Daoud Ahmed Faisal. York has claimed he started attending Friday prayers at the mosque in 1957, when he was aged 12; there are also reports that York's mother was involved with the mosque.

I began publishing the pamphlets of peace. I wrote, typed, illustrated, reproduced and distributed them almost single handedly. I diligently treaded [sic] the streets of New York and the surrounding area as I propagated Sufi Islaam [sic]. I was blessed with the 'gift of the gab' and combined with a sense of humour and charisma that draws people of all walks of life to me.

— Dwight York

York later noted that as a teenager he was involved in New York's street gangs. He was charged with statutory rape in June 1964 and in October with possession of a dangerous weapon and the assault of a police officer. In January 1965 he was convicted and received a three-year prison sentence, being paroled in October 1967. He then began working as a street trader, selling body oils, perfumes and incense in Brooklyn and Harlem, meanwhile developing his own ideas.

At some point between 1967 and 1969, York established a group called Ansaar Pure Sufi and an associated bookstore. He then adopted the title of Isa Abdullah for himself. A center for the group was established at 25 Bedford Avenue. Early members began wearing green and black tunics and adopting a symbol of an intertwined Islamic crescent, Star of David and ankh. They called themselves "Moors" and wore fez hats, reflecting an influence from the Moorish Science Temple. York rejected existing translations of the Quran and instead promoted his own.

=== The Nubian Islamic Hebrew Mission in America ===
By 1969, York had changed the name of his group to the Nubian Islamic Hebrew Mission in America (NIHMA). In 1971 he established its headquarters at 452 Rockaway Avenue in Brownsville, Brooklyn. The group also changed their typical appearance, its men beginning to dress in dashikis and fez hats, accompanied by nose rings and small bones piercing the ear. NIHMA women wore face veils. York began referring to himself as Isa Abd Allah bin Abu Bakr Muhammad, or just "Imam Isa" – Isa being the Arabic name for Jesus. He subsequently clarified that he did not see himself as the rebirth of Jesus, but did draw comparisons between them; for York, John the Baptist heralded the coming of Jesus just as Elijah Muhammad, former leader of the Nation of Islam, heralded the coming of York himself.

In 1973, York traveled to the Middle East and Africa, undertaking the umrah pilgrimage to Mecca. He also visited Sudan, where he claimed that he was initiated into the Order of Al-Khidr and joined the Sufi Order of Khawatiyya. He also maintained that at the Sudanese capital of Khartoum, he experienced a vision of Khidr, a legendary figure in Islamic lore, alongside the Twenty-Four Elders featured in the Book of Revelation. On his return to the U.S., York proclaimed himself the grandson of Muhammad Ahmad, a 19th-century Sudanese political leader who deemed himself the Mahdi, and alleged that he had been born exactly a hundred years after this grandfather; he also began using the term "Mahdi" for himself.

=== The Ansaaru Allah Community ===
In 1973, York's group again changed its name, this time to the Ansaaru Allah Community (AAC). The term Ansaaru Allah means "helper of Allah", and may have appealed to York because it affirmed a link with the Sudanese Ansar movement. This name change did not entail a rejection of their "Nubian Islamic Hebrew" identity; the group's literature continued referring to both the AAC and the Nubian Islamic Hebrews throughout much of the 1980s. Imitating common Sudanese clothing styles, members began wearing white jalabeeyah robes, with white turbans for men and face veils for women. On moving to Bushwick Avenue, the group also established its own security force, the Swords of Islam, modeled on the Fruit of Islam used by the Nation of Islam. The Swords were used to crack down on drug dealing in the area, something that earned public praise from Mayor Ed Koch and from the New York City Police Department (NYPD).

[York promoted] an Afrocentric Sufism that emphasised local dhikr with the duff and talking drums, identification with historical Nubia and Sudanese folk Islam, mystically guided apocalyptic anticolonialism, rigorous study of Arabic, claims of a "back to the scriptures" textualist revival, and aesthetics that incorporated Egyptian ankhs, nose rings, tarbushes, bones worn in the ears, and, in the case of [York] himself, tribal scarification.

— Scholar of religion Michael Muhammad Knight, 2020

AAC members began to live communally and spent much of their day at the group's mosque. Contact with prior friends and family was discouraged as these people were labeled kaafirs (unbelievers). Any money and furniture a newcomer had would be turned over to the community, while mothers and pregnant women were encouraged to claim public welfare, funds then given to the AAC. Members were assigned to single-sex quarters. Children were separated from their parents and raised communally, brought up to speak Arabic, Hebrew and York's invented language of Nubic.

Male AAC members were sent out as street missionaries and fundraisers called "propagators"; they were given a quota to meet, and those who failed in this were chastised or in some cases beaten. Men were rewarded with access to their female "mate" in the group's Green Room. An FBI investigation suggested that, at its peak, around 500 people were living at the AAC's commune. The AAC also expanded its property ownership across New York City, obtaining around thirty buildings including apartment blocks, two recording studios, restaurants, a grocery store and a laundromat. The group sent missionaries to other parts of the U.S. and also established groups in Montreal, Toronto, London, Port of Spain and in Jamaica.

York began maintaining that he was the only path to salvation, and in his publication The Truth: What Do People Say I Am? he included pictures of twenty prominent black leaders alongside his own descriptions of their apparent failures. Although referring to itself as Muslim, some of York's publications in this period drew far more on the New Testament than either the Quran or the Hebrew Bible. From the late 1970s and into the 1980s, the AAC also began making increasing use of themes regarding the alleged esoteric wisdom and advanced technologies of Ancient Egypt, New Age ideas such as chakras and extraterrestrial civilizations. From 1983, York was talking about Yanaan or Yaanuwn, an intergalactic sheikh who sometimes occupied York's body. In the late 1980s, Yaanuwn was given greater prominence and increasingly identified with York himself. In 1988, he told his followers: "I am an extraterrestrial incarnated."

In addition to the group's commune, York also had a personal property at West 29th Street on Coney Island. He managed the AAC with his inner circle, which comprised his ministers, his "wives" or concubines and his personal security force, the mujahid. In 1979, York founded a music group, Dr York and the Passion, which began performing at New York nightclubs. He also had a music studio, Passion, attached to his living quarters; attractive young women joining the AAC would often be assigned to work there, thus becoming another of his concubines. In 1983, York purchased 80 acres of land in the Catskills, on which the AAC established a summer retreat called Camp Jazzir Abba; the name was a reference to Aba Island in Sudan. The following year, York formed a Sufi order within his broader movement, the Sons of the Green Light. Between 1987 and 1991, the AAC also began referring to itself as the Original Tents of Kedar. In 1988, York retired as the imam of the AAC's Brooklyn mosque and hence spent more time at Camp Jazzir Abba.

==== Growing opposition ====
Over the course of the 1970s, the AAC began attracting negative attention from other Muslim groups active in New York City, who criticized the group's teachings as heretical. In 1973, members of the Mosque of Islamic Brotherhood, an African American Sunni group, physically attacked AAC members selling the group's newspapers in Manhattan. In response to growing Islamic criticism, in 1989 York issued a A Rebuttal to the Slanderers, in which he maintained that all previous translations of the Quran were false and that his own "19th translation" offered the "Supreme Code of the Quran". He further maintained that other Muslims were concealing the fact that the prophet Muhammad was a black African and denounced the first three Caliphs to succeed Muhammad as "usurpers", instead tracing the line of succession from Muhammad through to Muhammad Ahmad, the Sudanese Mahdi, and hence to himself.

Tensions with authorities escalated in the late 1970s, particularly after Horace Green—a man who had refused the AAC's attempts to buy his building—was murdered. A member of the AAC's mujahim was suspected, but nobody was convicted. A network of groups concerned about the AAC began to develop, incorporating ex-members, orthodox Muslim groups, the NYPD, the FBI, the Internal Revenue Service (IRS), the Immigration and Naturalization Service (INS) and the Bureau of Alcohol, Tobacco, Firearms and Explosives (ATF). In 1993, the FBI produced a report expressing their view that the AAC was a criminal enterprise masquerading as a religious community, and characterizing the mujahim as a protection racket.

=== The Holy Tabernacle Ministries ===
We do not want in any shape, form, or fashion to be associated with any anti-government or terrorist groups of Muslims, Moslems, Hebrews or the like, not even with our own brothers of Sudan. We are only Islaamic [sic] in the sense that we are in a state of peace when practicing our cultural observances passed down to us by Abraham, which makes us true Hebrews.

— The Savior, a Holy Tabernacle Ministries journal, 1995

In 1992, York disbanded the AAC. The group's publications then began referring to the movement as the Tents of Abraham and the Tents of Nubia, and in 1993 it reestablished itself as the Holy Tabernacle Ministries. In this form, York's group increasingly emphasised Hebrew and Jewish-derived themes, with various observers calling this the movement's "Jewish" phase. Increasingly, York also began referring to his teachings as "Factology", and gave increased attention to the themes of Ancient Egypt and of extraterrestrial civilizations. He presenting himself as Yaanuwn, an extraterrestrial from the planet Rizq in the galaxy of Illyuwm.

Islamic elements to the group were pushed aside: York distributed a lecture tape titled Islam is Poison, in one incident threw a Quran to the floor and stamped on it and maintained that Sunni Arabs would never accept the equality of African American Muslims. The rejection of Islamic themes may partly have been down to what York believed was a planned attempt on his life by the Egyptian Muslim militant Sayid Nosair in 1992. He began to state that the group's earlier Islamic identity was never intended to be permanent and would increasingly place the community in danger as Americans increasingly associated Islam with terrorism. Despite these shifts, York still wrote of how he was restoring Islam to its "pristine purity", used the Quran as a source in his teachings and spoke positively of Muslim-identified figures he admired like Elijah Muhammad and Daoud Faisal.

York largely abandoned his Arabic names and began calling himself Dr Malachi Z. York, or elsewhere Rabboni Y'shua Bar El Haady. He ceased referring to himself as the Mahdi. The Jazzir Abba retreat was renamed Mount Zion, while the group established a ceremonial sanctuary that they claimed was modeled on the Temple of Solomon. Islamic dress styles were abandoned; instead, members adopted what they considered the "attire of the Israelites", which included a nose ring and a light veil over the head and shoulders for women, and a long-sleeved split tunic with loose trousers, skullcap and golden girdle or sash for men. The group began observing Jewish holidays, and celebrating bar mitzvahs for adolescent males. It was also in 1992 that York founded an inner fraternal order for male Nuwaubians, the Lodge 19 of the Ancient and Mystical Order of Melchizedek; York identified Melchizedek as being the same figure as Khidr.

=== The United Nuwaubian Nation of Moors and Tama Re ===
In 1993, the Holy Tabernacle Ministries was renamed the United Nuwaubian Nation of Moors, a term later shortened to the United Nuwaubian Nation. The group sold its Brooklyn property and relocated to an area near Eatonton, Georgia, where it had bought 475 acres of land for $975,000. Around 100 followers moved there with York, erecting a compound built by voluntary labor between 1993 and 2000. Rejecting their previous styles of clothing, they began dressing in cowboy hats and boots. By 2002, about 400 people were living at the compound.

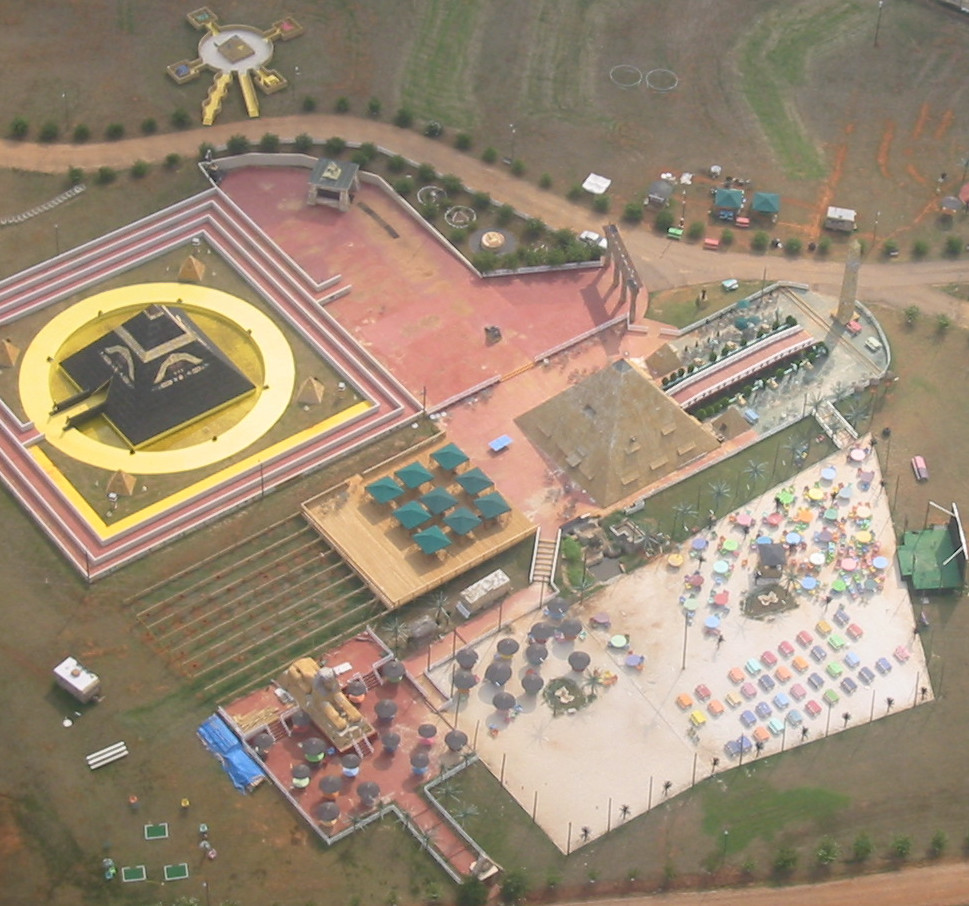
Aerial view of the Tama-Re compound as it stood in 2002

York began referring to his followers as the Yamassee Native American Moors of the Creek Nation, maintaining that their Georgia land represented a "Sovereign Nation". He alleged that his followers were descended from the first humans to settle the Americas, having walked there from ancient Egypt at a period before continental drift had separated Africa from the Americas. They filed for recognition with the Bureau of Indian Affairs, but were rejected. York began claiming to descend from Pocahontas on his maternal side, and was now referred to by his followers as "Maku" or "Chief Black Eagle".

As part of this new origin story, York claimed that his followers, and not contemporary Egyptians, were the true descendants of Ancient Egypt. Increasingly, he started foregrounding Egyptian motifs, symbols and paraphernalia into his movement, maintaining that the teachings he was promoting came from an Egyptian deity named Neteru. York started calling himself the "Supreme Grand Hierophant of the Ancient Egyptian Order".

It was in Georgia that the Nuwaubians built a theme park called Tama-Re. This included a museum of black history; a sphinx; a gold pyramid; and a larger, 40-foot high pyramid; this was black with gold trim, a design some have compared to the Kaaba in Mecca. The group called this an "Egiptian village" and advertised it as "the Mecca in the West". Tama-Re's function was as both a revenue-raising tourist attraction and also a pilgrimage site. Pilgrims subsequently came from the U.S., Canada, the Caribbean and the United Kingdom, with their numbers rising from 2,000 in 1999 to 5,000 in 2001. Although some pilgrims were committed Nuwaubians, they also included many black people interested in their racial heritage.

In 1996, York published the Nuwaubian holy book, The Holy Tablets. During this period, the group maintained Holy Tabernacle stores "in more than a dozen cities in the U.S., the United Kingdom, and Trinidad", and continued to gain revenues from them. York purchased a $557,000 mansion for his own use in Athens, Georgia, about sixty miles away from Tama-Re.

After the move to Georgia, there was a wave of defections from the group. Many of those defectors complained of unpaid labor, poor living conditions and both financial and sexual exploitation. By 2001, a network of ex-members had formed, centering under the leadership of York's son Jacob, who had left alongside his mother and three siblings in 1990. Jacob set up a halfway house for those leaving Tama-Re in Atlanta, through which he helped them establish a life outside the Nuwaubian community.

==== Local tensions ====
In Georgia, the Nuwaubians met substantial local opposition. From 1997, many of the issues revolved around breaches of building regulations. In 1998, Victor Greig, the group's administrator in charge of construction, was fined $45,750 for violating building code regulations in the erection of a social club. The following year, York appeared in court on a contempt motion filed by the county, but this was dismissed.

Initially, the Nuwaubians were considered "eccentric" yet tolerable by their neighbors. However, tensions increased when the group distributed leaflets attacking white people and claiming racially-motivated persecution in a zoning dispute. These actions alienated many residents of the area, both black and white, among other ethnicities and races. In 1998, the county sought an injunction against construction under any use that violated zoning policies. Subsequently, the Nuwaubians increased their leafletting of Eatonton and surrounding areas, charging white officials with racial discrimination and striving to increase opposition to them. Threats mounted and an eviscerated dog carcass was left at the home of the county attorney.

In 1999, the Nuwaubians launched their own local publication, The Putnam News, and the following year fielded candidates, associated with the Republican Party, for Putnam County elections. This contributed to local fears that the Nuwaubians were attempting a political takeover of the area, akin to that which the followers of the Rajneesh movement had allegedly attempted in Oregon. Local newspapers gave the Nuwaubians overwhelmingly negative coverage, while various journalists and attorneys who were deemed hostile to the group reported receiving death threats, having their property damaged or being stalked.

Amid these tensions, the Nuwaubians pursued links with the African American community more broadly; in 1999, they invited prominent community leaders Al Sharpton and Tyrone Brooks to visit Tama-Re and speak on their behalf, with Jesse Jackson then doing the same in 2001. The Nuwaubians also built links with the white-dominated Montana Freemen, a Christian Patriot militia. One of the Freemen, Everett Leon Stout, visited Tama-Re and encouraged the Nuwaubians to call on the county coroner to arrest the local sheriff and to file multi-million dollar lawsuits against various local officials.

=== York's prosecution and the demolition of Tama Re ===
Based on allegations of child molestation made by ex-members, the FBI built a criminal case against York beginning in 1997. On May 8, 2002, the FBI raided Tama-Re, using over 300 agents from the FBI, the ATF and the county sheriff's department. Five teenagers were taken into protective custody. That same morning, authorities arrested York in a supermarket in Milledgeville. He was initially charged with 116 counts pertaining to child molestation, although these were later reduced to 114; prosecutors subsequently added charges under the Racketeer Influenced and Corrupt Organizations Act (RICO) in November 2002. In October 2002, York pled not guilty, but at the advice of his attorney changed his plea to guilty January 2003 in exchange for a reduced fifteen-year sentence. This plea bargain was subsequently rejected by the High Court judge, Hugh Lawson.

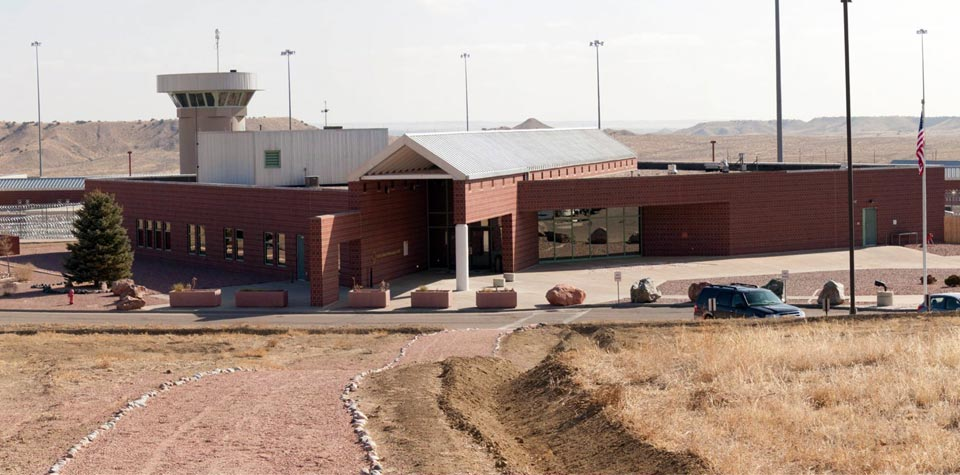
York was incarcerated at ADX Florence in Colorado.

As a result of substantial negative media attention directed at the Nuwaubians, the original jury pool was declared tainted and the trial was relocated to Brunswick, Georgia, where it began in January 2004. There, the prosecution brought forth witnesses who claimed York had committed abuse from 1988 onward. In the trial, York's defense attorney, Adrian Patrick, highlighted the lack of physical evidence for any molestation and claimed that those making the allegations were part of a conspiracy connected to York's son Jacob, who according to the defense was motivated by a personal grievance against his father.

The jury ultimately found York guilty on four counts of racketeering and six molestation-related charges. In April, Judge C. Ashley Royal sentenced York to a 135-year sentence, which would be served in the ADX Florence supermax prison in Colorado. In July, Royal issued an order allowing the state seizure of Tama-Re, deeming it to be among York's personal assets. Its structures were demolished and the land was sold at auction. In September 2005, York's conviction was upheld by the United States Court of Appeals for the Eleventh Circuit.

Following York's conviction, three witnesses for the prosecution retracted their testimony; the prosecution's star witness, Abigail Washington, recanted her testimony and declared York innocent, only to then rescind her recantation. Many of York's followers maintained that he was the innocent victim of a conspiracy by the "White Power Structure" and disgruntled ex-members. A solidarity meeting brought Nuwaubians together with representatives of the New Black Panther Party, Universal Zulu Nation, the Prince Hall Masons and the Moorish Science Temple. York's supporters subsequently established fundraising groups committed to securing his release.

As of 2024, the Nuwaubians' original compound in Brooklyn continues to function as both a bookstore and a place of religious service under the group "United Sabaeans Worldwide", with their bookstores now spread across the globe.

== Beliefs ==
Nuwaubians refer to their ideas as "Right Knowledge", "the Knowledge", or as "Nuwaubu," "Nuwaupu," or "Wu-Nuwaubu". These beliefs stem from the teachings of York, whom Nuwaubians call the "master teacher". York produced over 400 published writings, referred to as "scrolls", which have been issued under his various nom-de-plumes. York had appropriated and adapted elements from various other black new religions, such as the Nation of Islam. From these earlier doctrines, York developed his own particular synthesis. While drawing elements from Judaism, Christianity, and Islam, he has maintained that these religions' sacred texts have been adulterated and that his teachings are returning them to their pure form.

Palmer described York adopting a "cryptic style of teaching", one also characterized by a strong emphasis on joking and humor, and on mocking and criticizing better-established religions. In his teachings, he claimed that he wanted to awaken black people from their "sleep" or ignorance of reality, commenting that "I have devoted my visit to this planet to the resurrection of the mentally dead, which I affectionately refer to as mummies." He maintained that the "Spell of Kingu" had been cast over the African American people by the US government, media, popular culture, and the Christian churches. In many of his talks, he encouraged people not to take his word for things, but to do their own research.

=== Theology ===
The Nuwaubian worldview was described by Palmer as a form of "radical materialism". They reject the notion of a transcendental spiritual realm separate from the material one, believing the former a lie promoted by Christian churches to keep African-American people docile. For the Nuwaubians, as with the Nation of Islam before them, gods are therefore viewed as physical beings. York interpreted the Hebrew word Elohim, but which he preferred to spell "Eloheem", as being not a singular entity but a race of "angelic beings" who visited the Earth.

Rather than seeing the terms "Allah" and "God" as synonyms, as is typical, York distinguished between them. He interpreted the word "God" as an acronym encompassing three words in the Kufic language he developed—"Gomar Oz Dubar"—meaning "wisdom, strength, and beauty". He then presented these as traits possessed by the black man, meaning that, while black men are not Allah, they are God for they symbolize divinity within the world. The scholar of religion Michael Muhammad Knight suggested that this theological view represented York's negotiation with the theology of the Nation of Islam, which does maintain that black people are gods. Nuwaubians therefore perceive themselves as having an inner divinity, a doctrine that is shared widely among black new religions of North America, including among the Rastafari, Nation of Islam, Five-Percenters, and Black Hebrews.

York also taught the existence of Iblis (Shaytan), an oppositional figure in Islamic theology.

=== Race and black nationalism ===
Race is a consistent theme in York's writings, which are steeped in black nationalism. York regarded "Nubia" as the true name for Africa, and thus often referred to African Americans as "Nubians". Another term he used for Nubia was "Nuwauber" and in reference to this he called his followers "Nuwaubians". Palmer rejected the applicability of the term "black supremacist" to these teachings. The Nuwaubians seek racial separatism, rather than acceptance and absorption into white-dominated society. Palmer noted that the Nuwaubians' views on race were "complex and shifting", with the spiritual assessment of different racial groups changing throughout York's writings.

==== The origins of racial difference ====
In York's various writings he offered competing etiologies for human racial diversity. During the AAC period of the movement's development, York claimed that there were three races of humanity: the Nubians or Cushites (black Africans), the Amorites (white Europeans, West and South Asians), and the Edomites (East Asians). Of these, the Nubians were presented as the original race, descended directly from Adam and Eve. At that point York also claimed that Native Americans were not a distinct race but the product of ancient interbreeding between Cushites and Edomites. He sometimes used the term "Canaanite" synonymously with "Amorite" but in other instances used "Canaanite" for what he regarded as a "sub-tribe" of white Amorites who had raped Nubian women and thus produced offspring with darker skin but straight hair; these, he identified as the peoples of West and South Asia.

York provided a different account of racial difference in his 1996 work Extraterrestrials Among Us. Here he claimed that black people are the descendants of extraterrestrials from the planet Rizq, a group he called the "Annunaqi Eloheem". He maintained that these extraterrestrials had to flee Rizq after it was threatened by rays from its three suns: Utu, Apsu, and Shamash. He described this species as being green-skinned, "beautiful angelic beings", but that as these extraterrestrials entered the Earth's atmosphere, the magnesium in their melanin was replaced by iron, changing the color of their skin to dark brown. He further maintained that they settled in ancient Egypt and established ancient Egyptian civilization. White people, York claimed, instead descend from lizard-like "reptoids" while those he deemed racially Mongoloid came from the Terros.

York claimed that genetic tampering by extraterrestrials had resulted in humanity losing many its innate capacities, such as telepathy and clairvoyance. He maintained that various extraterrestrial species reside on Earth, concealed underground, but that they sometimes breed with humans. One such species that he claimed lived underground were the Deros, an obese species whose half-human offspring are similarly obese. Another of the subterranean species were the Teros; York claimed that when they bred with humans, the resulting offspring had Down syndrome. In his text Is God an Extraterrestrial?, York claimed that a new race was emerging, the Neutranoids, who lacked clear racial traits and were the puppets of forces wishing to undermine Earth's racial diversity.

==== White people ====
In Nuwaubian discourse, white people are referred to as "Palemen" or "Amorites". They are often framed negatively; in his 1990 publication The Paleman, York writes that "The Pale race are a race of Jinn, Devils." In a recorded lecture, York openly described himself as a "racist" and insisted that "White people are devils, and always was, always will be." As part of this view, he characterized Judaism and Christianity as "religions of the Devil".

Among York's early writings, he maintained that white people are the result of the Curse of Ham; in this he reversed a longstanding white supremacist claim in US society that the Curse of Ham resulted in formation of black people. York attributed white people's pale skin to leprosy, a notion that may have derived from two Black Hebrew figures who wrote in the 1920s, Clarke Jenkins and Father Hurley. York further claimed, in The Paleman, that Native Americans and Asians all have Down syndrome, which he claimed was a side-effect of leprosy. In an alternative account of York's, white people are described as the offspring of fallen angels who, after falling to Earth, mated with the wicked women of Nod. As part of this perspective, whites are presented as lacking the soul or spirit of Allah and are thus driven by instinct, lacking in compassion. Elsewhere, York claimed that white people arose from the albinos born to Adam and Eve, and that they were labeled "Cain", which he then claimed was a shortened form of the racial term "Caucasian".

In contrast to the generally negative assessment of white people, the Nuwaubians have maintained that a few whites, known as "white angels", have the remnant of a soul and were sent to Earth to help black people. Examples that these practitioners cite are those European Americans who helped run the Underground Railroad to get enslaved African Americans away from the southern states. The Nuwaubians add that through these actions, these white individuals may grow a soul, at which their skin will also darken. Palmer observed various Nuwaubians who had little problem engaging in a friendly manner with white individuals.

=== Cosmogony and mythology ===
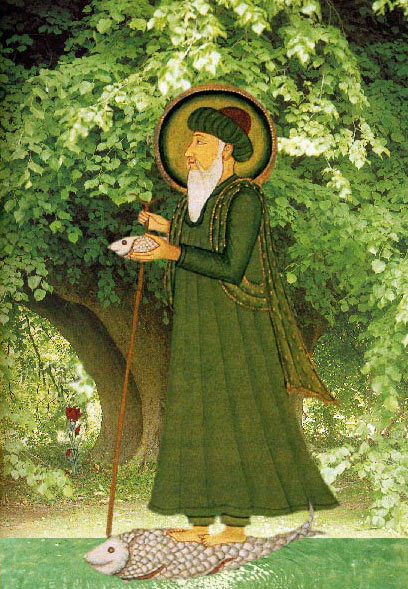
York claimed that in Sudan he had a vision of Khidr (pictured), with the latter also being the figure Melchisedek.

York promoted his own myth regarding the origins of the black man. In his earlier writings, York claimed that the name of Adam – the first man in various Abrahamic mythologies – derived from the Hebrew Ah-Dam, meaning 'black mud', which he took as evidence that Adam was a black man. Subsequently, from 1992 York changed his claims and began insisting that Adam came not from black mud but from brown dust. By the 1990s, York was maintaining that "Adama" was the first man created by the Eloheem, 49,000 years ago. He maintained that both Adam and Eve were formed at the junction of the Blue and White Niles in Sudan. They then went to the Garden of Eden, which was located at Mecca, but after being cast out of the Garden they returned to Sudan, which thus constitutes the cradle of humanity.

York's teachings maintain that the descendants of Cain waged an ancient war on Salaam, a technologically advanced society that existed on land now beneath the Red Sea. Salaam was centred at a capital city named Mu and ruled by Khidr/Melchisedek. Once Cain's descendants destroyed Mu, the Red Sea rose and submerged Salaam, cutting off Africa from the Arabian peninsula. York stated that this break between the two continents was alluded to in Elijah Muhammad's NOI story regarding how the moon broke from the Earth; York insisted that Elijah Muhammad's tale was allegorical, with the moon symbolizing Asia and the Earth symbolizing Africa.

York stated that after Noah was seen naked by his son Ham, the former cursed Ham's son Canaan, whose descendants would suffer albinism. This is one of York's various accounts for the origins of white people. In York's mythology, Canaan and his sister-wife then fled to the Caucasus Mountains, where they had 11 sons. York claimed that their descendants became increasingly animalistic, walking on all-fours and engaging in cannibalism. He further maintained that the white Amorite women began copulating with dogs and other animals, explaining the development of straight hair textures among their descendants.

In York's writings, it is claimed that both Abraham and Moses were sent by Allah to civilize the white Amorites. York stated that Abraham attracted a group of white followers, who falsely believed themselves to be his descendants and became the "pale Jews". York maintains that the claim, made by that "pale Jews", that they are descendants of the ancient Israelites is false; instead he says that the only true living descendants of the Israelites are the Ethiopian Beta Israel. York's teachings also claim that the Buddha was a prophet sent by Allah to the Amorites living in the Indian subcontinent.

York stated that Abraham's son Ishmael was the first Arab. However, York maintains that, of Ishmael's sons, only Kedar preserved his racial purity; he thus presented his Nuwaubians as the descendants of Abraham via Ishmael and Kedar. York claimed that Kedar's descendants were racially Nubian and were the true Arabs. He contrasts these against what he considers false, "pale Arabs", who tricked the true Arabs, scattering them out of Arabia, kidnapping them, and selling them to European slave traders. York's teachings thus de-centre the "pale Arabs" of Arabia as the natural authorities in Islam and instead centers Sudan as the true heartland of Islam.

==== Jesus and Muhammad ====
According to York, Jesus was the biological son of the angel Gabriel, who had had sex with Jesus' mother Mary. In his 1980 book Was Christ Really Crucified?, York claimed that Jesus escaped crucifixion and then traveled throughout Africa and the Middle East. This was an idea that probably derived ultimately from Levi H. Dowling's Aquarian Gospel of Jesus.

In York's view, the Islamic prophet Muhammad was a black Nubian, something that has been concealed by pale Arab Muslims. York taught that the Buraq, an animal that Muhammad rode into the heavens in Islamic belief, was actually a fleet of spaceships. He maintained that these ships will one day ascend to Earth to gather the 144,000. For York, the first three Caliphs who succeeded Muhammad were all usurpers. In his view, Muhammad's "unmistakably black" daughter Fatima and son-in-law Ali had to flee persecution by the "pale Arab" Abu Bakr.

=== Millenarianism ===
I, YAANUWN, Am An ANUNNAQI Or What You Could Call An Extra-Terrestrial[...] I Am What You Would Call An Angelic Being [from] ILLYUWN[...] I Have Incarnated Here in This Form To Act As A Human Being For The Sole Purpose Of Saving The Children of THE ELOHEEM (ANUNNAQI)[...] The Chosen 144,000[...] I YAANUWN, Have Come To Save The Children Of The ELOHEEM (ANNUNAQI) From Being Killed As You Bring Your Planet Near To What Could Be Its Total Destruction.

— Dwight York, Man from Planet Rizq, c.1993

The Nuwaubians are a millenarian movement. During the movement's earlier, more Islam-centred phases, York claimed that Shaytan's rule over the Earth would end in the year 2000. He maintained that in preparation, there needed to be born 144,000 Nubian children who would "rapture" their parents when that occurred.

In 1990, York claimed that white people would continue suffering the symptoms of leprosy – in which he included sun blisters, asthma, eczema, and AIDS – as the sun became hotter and the ozone layer thinner. He added that this would culminate in 2000, when Shaytan's rule on Earth would end and the white people would be forced to flee into underground caverns to escape the sun, allowing black people to rule the surface.

York maintained that on May 5, 2000, a series of catastrophes would befall the Earth. He further claimed that on August 12, 2003, spaceships will arrive to begin to arrive to rescue the 144,000 righteous people; these rescues, he thought, would continue until June 26, 2030. As part of this, he described how a "Mothership" would land on the pyramid that the Nuwaubians had erected at Tama Re. He varyingly referred to this spaceship as the "Motherplane", "Nibiru", and "the Crystal City". he associated this with the Merkabah described in Ezekiel 1. York said that these "worthy souls" will go to "the Crystal City" before returning to the Earth to "save the planet" a thousand years later. When these prophecies events failed to come about, it led to some defections from the Nuwaubian movement.

=== Morality and gender roles ===
York emphasised that his Nuwaubians should not follow the moral conventions of mainstream American society on issues such as sexuality, stating: "we are Africans. We have our own laws, morality, customs, rules, regulations." In York's publication, Sex Life of a Muslim, he recommended the practice of oral and anal sex, and the drinking of semen, advice contravening that of mainstream Islam. In the lecture "Does God Exist According To Our Time" he also defended incest given its practice among the royal families of ancient Egypt. There is also one letter in which York noted that in many African societies women marry and have children at a young age, a statement which US criminal prosecutors subsequently highlighted as evidence that York endorsed sex between teenagers and adults.

York maintained that a woman's appropriate social role was as a wife and mother. In his publication Hadrat Fatima Part 2, York claimed that ideally a man should have four wives: a domestic wife, a companion wife, an educated wife, and a cultured wife. While the AAC advocated polygamy, in practice only the movement's senior leaders had multiple wives. York himself, one of his wives reported, had at least 50 wives. Generally, marriages within the movement were informal, with no wedding ceremony. York would sometimes choose marriage partners for his followers, with some accounts maintaining that in some instances he deliberately picked incompatible personalities for his own amusement. Birth control and abortion were condemned as tools of a white conspiracy to reduce the black birthrate.

During the AAC period, most women lived separately from their male partners, in distinct women's quarters. If a man proved successful in fundraising for the group, he was rewarded with a sexual assignation with his female partner, inside the "Green Room" decorated with images of the Garden of Eden. York used his followers' wives as concubines, something designed to test their loyalty to him. With these various women, York had around 100 children. Children in the Ansaaru Allah Community were not taught English, but instead Hebrew, Arabic, and Nubic, the language that York invented. Interracial marriage is condemned as treachery to one's race.

== Practices ==
=== Question and Answer sessions ===
During the AAC period, the movement's ministers oversaw "Question and Answer" sessions at its various bookstores, usually on Sunday afternoons. These sessions were a space for followers to engage in speculative discussions. Ministers in attendance often serve to raise questions and encourage debate among the attendees, rather than to provide coherent answers.

=== Language ===
Like other black nationalist new religions that arose in the 20th century, the Nuwaubian movement emphasised the deconstruction of the English language. They use words as a means of empowerment, focusing on the sounds of the words and the rhythms of the syllables. In understanding the meaning of the words, they reject standard philology and linguistics; Palmer noted that the Nuwaubians instead employed "word play, erroneous semantic links or make-up definitions" in their understanding of language. She described an example at a Nuwaubian meeting where the speaker maintained that the word "exact" derives from "eggs-act" and pertained to how an egg can break. Elsewhere, York claimed that the term "gospel" came from "ghost spell".

Nuwaubians often greet each other with the Nubic term "Rahuawabbat". They often use the term "overstanding" for "understanding," a change borrowed from Rastafari, and similarly "overtaking" for "undertaking".

=== Calendar and festival ===
York also established his own calendar, which marked the year 1970 as the Nuwaubian year 1 A.T. ("After the Truth"). During the movement's Jewish-oriented phase in the early 1990s, its members observed Jewish Shabbat regulations, resting between sunset on Friday and the sunset on Saturday. During this period, the movement also celebrated a range of Jewish festivals, including Passover, Rosh Hashanah, Yom Kippur, and Hannukah.

== Organization ==
During the movement's AAC period, much of the organization was run by York's various wives, who oversaw its finances, publishing output, and administration. There are various fraternal orders within the broader Nuwaubian movement.

=== Press and media ===
York's followers established stalls in various cities from which they sold their leader's writings as well as incense and oils. Knight noted that in doing so, the Ansar became a "well-known presence" in various cities of the northeastern United States. The group also established a chain of bookstores, referred to as the Original Tents of Kedar until 1993, after which they were renamed All Eyes on Egipt. The Nation also issued DVDs of York's speeches.

== Demographics ==
Knight noted that over the course of its history, the Nuwaubian movement had thousands of members. By 2000, the United Nuwaubian Nation of Moors had some 500 adherents. Palmer suggested that there were "two levels of membership" within the movement. These included the long-term core, who stayed with York over the various transitions his movement underwent, and the short-term group, who often involved themselves with the AAC but later moved into more mainstream forms of Islam. Different factors might have appealed in attracting converts; for some, the main appeal was likely the movement's black nationalist message, while others probably joined because they were looking for the "real Islam".

Based on her visits to Tama Re in 2004, Palmer concluded that at that point older Nuwaubians tended to be blue-collar workers who lacked formal education and sometimes had criminal pasts, while the younger followers were more "upwardly mobile", possessing university degrees and professional jobs. During the Nuwaubian phase of the group's history, one of its spokespeople stated that they also had white and Asian followers as well as black ones.

== Reception and influence ==
Palmer termed the Nuwaubians "one of the most significant Black Nationalist spiritual movements in America, if only in terms of its longevity". In 2000, O'Connor observed that the group "contributes strongly to the current trend of Afrocentrism in African American social and cultural discourse". According to Palmer, the shifts and changes in direction that the movement underwent were "even more rapid and extreme" than in other new religions like the Children of God, Church of Scientology, and Rajneesh Foundation. Knight observed that for outsiders to the movement, the Nuwaubian group's defining features were its "eclectic references and seemingly incoherent self-identification".

The Southern Poverty Law Center accuse the Nuwaubians of expressing "black supremacist ideas", and of being a hate group. Journalistic coverage has been overwhelmingly negative, with group members generally taking a hostile view of journalists. Two hostile books on the group were also published, The Ansar Cult in America (1988) by Muslim cleric Bilal Phillips and Ungodly by journalist Bill Osinski. There has also been academic interest in the group, initially by those in Islamic studies but subsequently predominantly by those in new religious movement studies. The white Canadian scholar of religion Susan Palmer subsequently investigated the group; she was welcomed to its meetings, was allowed to participate in some rituals, and permitted to chat informally with various Nuwaubians.

Sunni Muslims deem York a blasphemer and a fake Muslim. In 1994, Ghazi Y. Khankan, director of the New York office of the Council on American–Islamic Relations, commented about York and his group based on their history in Brooklyn. He said, "It's a cult, in my opinion, and in Islam there are no cults. They consider their leader a prophet, which means they have deviated from the Islamic way." Palmer believed that the substantial opposition faced by the Nuwaubians was influenced by the anti-cult movement, racism against African-Americans, and York's own provocative behavior. The Nuwaubians' critics in the anti-cult movement labeled it a cult. For them, York is a stereotypical "cult leader," a charlatan and con artist. They maintain that the substantial changes that York brought to the Nuwuabian movement was evidence for fraudulence, with York adopting different marketing strategies in his attempt to attract black youth. Critics similarly often emphasise York's role as a plagiarist who borrowed heavily from earlier writers.

=== Influence upon hip-hop ===
As "Dr. York", the movement's leader was a vocalist and music producer in Brooklyn before he left the area. During this time, his Nuwaubian teachings affected hip hop and Black culture in New York. Journalist Adam Heimlich of the New York Press suggested the following were influenced by York: Jaz-O, Doug E. Fresh, Afrika Bambaataa, Posdnuos from De La Soul, Prodigy from Mobb Deep, and MF Doom/KMD.

In indie hip hop, there are Nuwaubians who perform what they call Nu-wop, such as Daddi Kuwsh, Twinity, Nefu Amun Hotep, 9thScientist, Scienz of Life, Ntelek, Jedi Mind Tricks, Aslaam Mahdi, 720 Pure Sufi, Tos El Bashir and The Lost Children of Babylon.
