= Dwight York =

American criminal and new religious movement leader (born 1945)

- York after his arrest in 2002
- Born: June 26, 1945 (age 81); Baltimore, Maryland, U.S.
- Other names: Malachi Z. York, Issa al-Haadi al-Mahdi, and others
- Organization: Nuwaubian Nation
- Spouse: Kathy Johnson
- Status: Incarcerated
- Criminal charges: Child sexual abuse, rape, racketeering, conspiracy, tax fraud
- Penalty: 135 years imprisonment

Details
- Imprisoned at: ADX Florence in Florence, Colorado

Dwight York (born June 26, 1945), also known as Malachi Z. York, Issa al-Haadi al-Mahdi, et alii, is an American religious leader, best known as the founder of the Nuwaubian Nation, a new religious movement that has existed in some form and under various different names since the 1960s. The Nuwaubian Nation is identified by the Southern Poverty Law Center as a hate group advocating black supremacy. Other observers describe the Nuwaubian Nation as "an African-American spiritual movement" that had taken different forms since its inception.

York's origins are contested. After converting to Islam in prison, in 1967 he began preaching to African-Americans in Brooklyn, New York, during the black power movement. He last called his group the United Nuwaubian Nation of Moors, Nuwaubian Nation, or Nuwabians. These were at first based on pseudo-Islamic themes and Judaism; later he mixed ideas taken from black nationalism, cryptozoology, Christianity, UFO religions, New Age, the sovereign citizen movement and popular conspiracy theories. Around 1990, York and the Nuwaubian Nation relocated to rural Putnam County, Georgia. They came under scrutiny in the early 1990s after they built Tama-Re, an Egyptian-themed park compound for about a hundred of his followers in Putnam County.

Before York's trial, the community had been joined directly and in the area by hundreds of other followers from out of state, while alienating both Black and White local residents. The community was intensively investigated after numerous reports that York had molested many children of his followers. York was convicted in 2004 of travel and transport of minors for the purpose of criminal sexual activity, as well as violations of the Racketeer Influenced and Corrupt Organizations Act. He is serving 135 years in prison.

== Early life ==
York's origins and background are contested, with little biographical data available. York claims he was born in Sudan, on June 26, 1945. A 1993 Federal Bureau of Investigation report agrees with that date but claimed he was born in Baltimore, Maryland, while other sources give his birthplace as New Jersey, or New York. His biological father is unknown. York later claimed to be the son of Al Haadi Abdur Rahman al Mahdi, the grandson of Muhammad Ahmad, who led an uprising against the British in Sudan. Bilal Philips, a Muslim countercultist, claimed York was born a decade earlier than he claimed, in 1935, and had changed his birth date to bolster his claims of being Ahmad's grandson.

He grew up in New York City. York was a member of street gangs in his youth; he admitted this in his own writings, and said that he was a "youthful offender". About this time he met Dorothy Mae Johnson, whom he married and had five children with. At the time of their marriage they were both 18; Johnson would later help him manage his groups in New York. According to the FBI report, in 1964 York was charged with several crimes: weapons possession, resisting police, and statutory rape. He was sentenced to three years in prison on January 6, 1965. While in prison, York encountered black Muslim preachers and became a convert. He served less than his full sentence and was ultimately paroled on October 20, 1967. He sold "African incense" on the streets and debated streetgoers on black philosophy.

After his release he attended an Islamic Mission of America, Inc. mosque on State Street, Brooklyn, New York, led by Daoud Ahmed Faisal, who became a spiritual mentor to York. Daoud was at odds with the Nation of Islam and made members carry "Sunni identification cards" to prove they were not NOI members. York was also affiliated with the Moorish Science Temple of America.

== Religious leadership ==
In the late 1960s York, calling himself "Iman Isa", combined elements of the Moorish Science Temple of America, the Nation of Islam, the Nation of Gods and Earths and Freemasonry, and founded a quasi-Muslim black nationalist movement and community. He called it "Ansaar Pure Sufi", or the "Ansaaru Allah Community", c. 1970. He instructed members to wear black and green dashikis. He authored over 450 works of varying length that espoused his views. The new religious movement he led has existed in various forms under various different names since the 1960s. In ideology it was black supremacist.

These were at first based on pseudo-Islamic themes and Judaism (Nubian Islamic Hebrews). Later he developed a theme-park derived from "Ancient Egypt", mixing ideas taken from black nationalism, cryptozoology, Christianity, UFO religions, New Age, and popular conspiracy theories. He last called his group the United Nuwaubian Nation of Moors, Nuwaubian Nation (the "of Moors" was dropped in 2003), or Nuwabians. York's organization was classified as a Moorish sovereign citizen group.

York later traveled to Africa, to Sudan and Egypt in particular. He met and persuaded members of Mohamed Ahmed Al-Mahdi's family to finance him to set up a cell of their organization in the United States. This was to be a "west" or "American" political wing of Sudan's Ansar movement under Sadiq al-Mahdi (also see Umma Party). He began to develop the claim of his "Sudanese" roots in order to authenticate his American branch of the sect.

=== Brooklyn (1980–1993) ===
In 1967, he was preaching to the "Ansaaru Allah" (viz. African-Americans) in Brooklyn, New York, during the period of the black power movement. He later changed his name to "Iman Isa Abdullah" and renamed his "Ansaar Pure Sufi" ministry to the "Nubians" in Brooklyn in 1967. The group was considered to be part of the Black Hebrews phenomenon, under the name "Nubian Islaamic Hebrews" and "Nubian Hebrew Mission" as of 1969. Unlike other groups, they were not Judeo-Christian but Judeo-Islamic.

The community in Brooklyn, reported as identifying as the "Holy Tabernacle of the Most High" and also as the "Children of Abraham", was said to be led by Rabboni Y'shua Bar El Haady. They practiced a mixture of Judaism and Islam. They were reported as numbering about 300 persons and in 1994, the group reportedly still owned nine apartment buildings, of which five were in tax arrears. Local politicians were concerned that the abandoned buildings would become centers of uses that would damage the neighborhood. Anecdotal reports were that some of the group went to Monroe County, New York, and others to Georgia.

York's groups had a variety of names and functions: quasi-religious, fraternal, and tribal. They were called "Holy Tabernacle Ministries", "Egiptian [sic] Church of Karast," "Holy Seed Baptist Synagogue", "Ancient Mystic Order of Melchizedek", "Ancient Egiptian [sic] Order", "All Eyez on Egypt", "United Nuwaubian Nation of Moors", "Yamassee Native American Tribe", "Washitaw Tribe", and "Lodge 19 of the Ancient and Mystic Order of Malachizodok." He also adopted a number of titles and pseudonyms, including "The Supreme Grand Master Dr. Malachi Z. York," "Nayya Malachizodoq-El", and "Chief Black Eagle". In 1988 York was convicted of obtaining a passport with a false birth certificate.

He launched his own record label, named Passion Productions, recording as the solo artist "Dr. York". His debut release and also a video, was the single "Only a Dream" (later included in the album New York, Hot Melt Records UK, 1985). "Dr. York" and Passion Productions were advertised in the May 4, 1985, issue of Billboard magazine. He also released Passion on his York Records and Passion Records imprint. A group that consisted of York, Zeemo (Abdul Aziz), and Steve (Segovia) and later even featured Wendell Sawyer, Vernon Sawyer, and Ted Mills of the group Blue Magic. York said he performed popular music in order to "reach a mass majority of my people through my music." His Passion Studios recorded artists like Force MD's, Fredro Starr of Onyx, and Stetsasonic.

=== Move to Georgia and construction of Tama-Re (1993–2002) ===
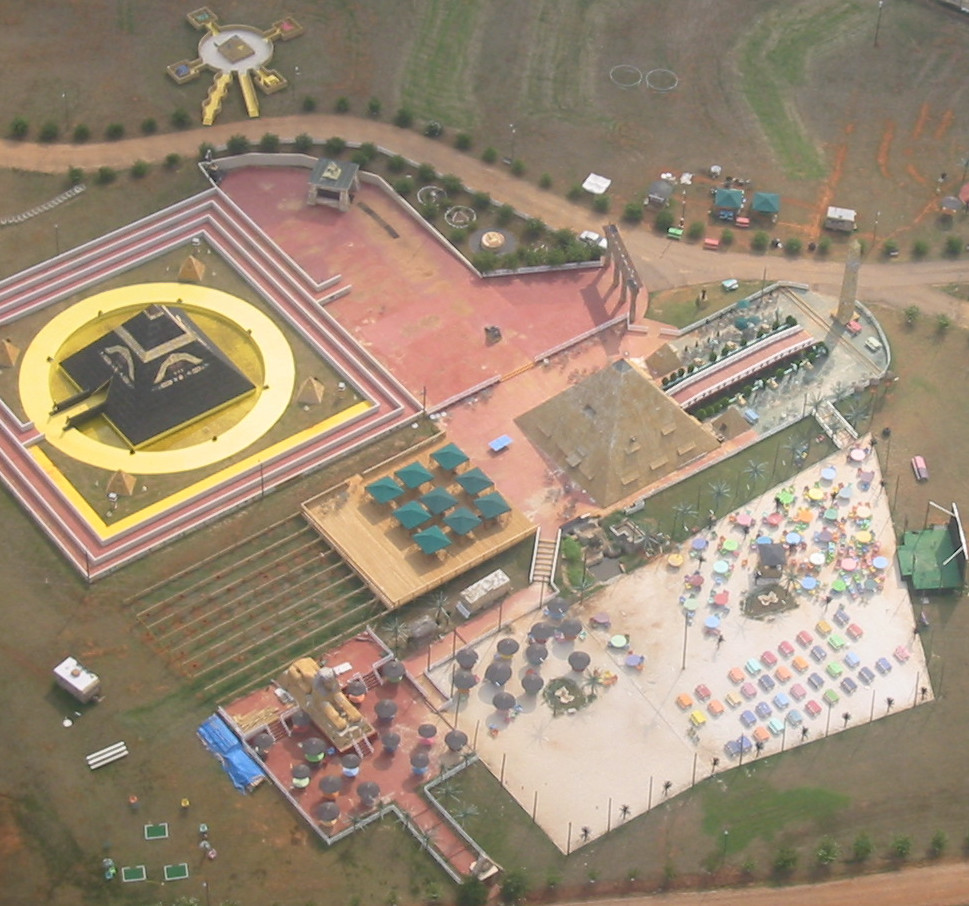
The central part of the Tama-Re compound, as seen from the air, 2002

York left Brooklyn with an estimated 300 followers around 1990. Some settled in upstate New York. He later moved with numerous followers to Georgia. Others joined them from such cities as Baltimore, Philadelphia, Hartford, New York and Washington, D.C. Around 1990, York and the Nuwaubian Nation relocated to rural Putnam County, Georgia, where they built a large complex. At York's direction, the community purchased land and built Tama-Re(originally named Kadesh), an Egyptian-themed complex built on 476 acres (1.93 km^{2}) of land near Eatonton, Georgia. It was built over a period of years and completed in 1993.

They came under scrutiny as a result of the building of the commune. According to former follower Robert J. Rohan, who later wrote a book about the movement, York moved in order to avoid criminal investigations and other charges in New York.

Perhaps to avoid scrutiny from the international Muslim community, the Nation of Islam, the Nation of Gods and Earths, legal troubles, and the negative history of his group during their New York period, he changed his own name several times, as well as the group's name, and masked different parts of their doctrine. In Georgia, they changed their name to the "United Nuwaubian Nation of Moors".

In 1996, York published the Nuwaubian holy book, The Holy Tablets. Tensions with county authorities increased in 1998, when the county sought an injunction against construction and uses that violated zoning. At the same time, the Nuwaubian community increased its leafletting of Eatonton and surrounding areas, charging white officials with racial discrimination and striving to increase opposition to them. Threats mounted and an eviscerated dog carcass was left at the home of the county attorney. The community had been joined directly and in the area by hundreds of other followers from out of State, while alienating both Black and White local residents.

Within Putnam County, the Nuwaubians lost black support, in part by trying to take over the NAACP chapter. But outside, they appealed to activists, claiming to be persecuted in the county. During this period, the group maintained Holy Tabernacle stores "in more than a dozen cities in the U.S., the United Kingdom and Trinidad." York purchased a $557,000 mansion in Athens, Georgia, about 60 miles away, the base of the University of Georgia.

In July 1999, Time magazine reported on the "40-ft. pyramids, obelisks, gods, goddesses and a giant sphinx," built by York's followers in rural Georgia in an article titled "Space Invaders".

== Legal issues ==
=== Arrest and conviction (2002–present) ===
York had established strict sexual practices within the community, reserving for himself sexual access to many women and girls, including wives and children of followers. Husbands and wives were separated from each other and from their children, with York only allowing them to live together once every three months, only through prior appointment in the "Green Room".

The community was intensively investigated after numerous reports that York had molested numerous children of his followers. Anonymous letters were sent to Putnam County officials alleging child molestation at the Nuwaubian community. The FBI, which had started investigating the group in 1993, assigned a major task force to it. In May 2002 York and his wife Kathy Johnson were arrested. York was charged with more than 100 counts of sexually molesting dozens of children, some as young as four years old. According to Bill Osinski, state prosecutors had to cut down the number of cases against York, which numbered over a thousand, to about 200, fearing "a jury simply wouldn't believe the magnitude of York's evil".

In 2003, York entered into a plea bargain that was later dismissed by the judge. He was convicted by a jury on January 23, 2004. The judge rejected his plea to be returned for trial to his own "tribe", after York claimed status as an indigenous person. He claimed that the court had no jurisdiction over him, asserted that he was a "secured party", and answered questions in court with the response: "I accept that for value."

Early in 2004, York was convicted in federal court by a jury of multiple racketeering (RICO), child molestation, and financial reporting charges. He was sentenced to 135 years in prison. Some of the Nuwaubians relocated to Athens, Georgia after his arrest.

=== Controversy surrounding York's conviction ===
Significant controversy surrounds the 2004 conviction of York. Not only do many of his supporters maintain that he is innocent, but a number of independent critics also point to perceived flaws in the prosecution. Susan J. Palmer, a Canadian sociologist who researched in York's case, claimed in a 2025 interview that she was "quite convinced (York) did not receive a fair trial."

York's defense team had repeatedly argued that witnesses were coerced into testifying against him. During York's three-week court hearing in January 2004, exactly half (seven) of the fourteen witnesses changed their stories while they were on the stand, first asserting, then denying (or first denying, then asserting) abuse . One of the key witnesses, Abigail Washington, a.k.a. Habibah Washington, publicly recanted her testimony against York. However, she later said on the stand that her trial testimony against York was true, that she recanted her testimony because she felt sorry for York.

Supporters of York have argued that his sentence was excessively punitive, noting that in January 2003, he initially accepted a plea bargain that would have resulted in a 15-year prison term. However, U.S. District Judge Hugh Lawson rejected the deal, deeming it “too lenient”. When York's trial reopened in January 2004, ABC News projected that "York could be sentenced to up to 40 years".

More than half of York's sentence (70 years out of 135 years) stemmed from racketeering, money laundering and conspiracy charges under the Racketeer Influenced and Corrupt Organizations Act (RICO), a federal law designed to combat organized crime.

Critics, such as those cited in an essay published by Trinity College, have argued that local law enforcement, particularly Putnam County Sheriff Howard Sills, acted excessively. After the conviction, the government seized the Nuwaubian compound Tama-Re, demolished the property and sold the land. Critics point to the fact that proceeds from the sale of the land were distributed to the FBI and the Putnam County Sheriff's department.

=== Imprisonment ===
As of 2024, Dwight York is serving his sentence at the United States Penitentiary Administrative Maximum Facility (ADX) in Florence, Colorado, as Inmate # 17911–054, in solitary confinement for 23 hours a day. His projected release date is July 12, 2120.

York's followers have said that since 1999 York has been a Consul General of Monrovia, Liberia, under appointment from then-President Charles Taylor. They argue he should be given diplomatic immunity from prosecution and extradited as a persona non grata to Liberia.

== Aliases ==
York has been known by a multitude of aliases over the years, many of which he used simultaneously. The primary name from York's followers is Malachi Z. York, or Dr. Malachi Z. York. Other aliases include the following:

- Dr. York
- Malakai Z. York
- Dr. Malachi Z. York-El
- H.E. Dr. Malachi Kobina Yorke™
- Imperial Grand Potentate Noble: Rev. Dr. Malachi Z. York 33°/720°
- Consul General: Dr. Malachi Z. York ©™
- Grand Al Mufti "Divan" Noble Rev. Dr. Malichi Z. York-El
- As Sayyid Al Imaam Issa Al Haadi Al Mahdi
- Asayeed El Imaam Issa El Haaiy El Mahdi
- Isa Abd'Allah Ibn Abu Bakr Muhammad
- Isa al-Haadi al-Mahdi
- Al Hajj Al Imaam Isa Abd'Allah Muhammad Al Mahdi
- Irie I Sayyid Al Mumbra Issa El Haajidi Tundi the Divine and Noble Blackthello
