= Wakeel Allah =

American author

Wakeel Allah is an American author, and a member of the Nation of Islam. He is best known for his books In the Name of Allah: A History of Clarence 13X and the Five Percenters Vol. 1, and his subsequent book In the Name of Allah: A History of Clarence 13X and the Five Percenters Vol. 2.

== Biography ==
Wakeel Allah was born and raised in Plainfield, NJ, and joined the Five-Percent Nation as a freshman at Plainfield High School. He attended Morehouse College in Atlanta and became a prominent advocate of Five Percenter and Nation of Islam teachings and was responsible for recruiting distinguished members to both movements. Wakeel Allah and Dr. Wesley Muhammad founded the organization known as the Allah Team, which is a society of Islamic educators, activists, artists, and cultural influencers. Wakeel Allah is also a member of the Nation of Islam under the leadership of Minister Louis Farrakhan.

=== Career ===
Wakeel Allah has been viewed as a premiere historian of the Five Percent Nation and Nation of Islam movements. His published works include The History of the Nation of Islam Vol. 1: The Pioneer Years (1930–1950), "Our Story: A Black Muslim Anthology of NOI Pioneers of the 1930s and 1940s", "In the Name of Allah: A History of Clarence 13X and the 5 Percenters Vol. 1 & Vol. 2" and The Naked Truth, From the Goal Mind of Abu Shahid: The Elder of the Nation of Gods and Earths as Told to Wakeel Allah

=== Influences ===
In the song lyrics of "Exhibit C" by rapper Jay Electronica of Roc Nation, "trying to find the meaning of life in a Corona, till the Five Percenters rolled up on a nigga and reformed him", he credits Allah and Muhammad aka "True Islam" as the ones who recruited him to the Five Percent Nation.

In an article in The Final Call newspaper that covered the response of "the Demonstration," which was a performance by Jay Electronica and Jay-Z at the Brooklyn Hip-Hop Festival accompanied by a large cadre of the Fruit of Islam, Wakeel Allah wrote about the historical ties between the Nation of Islam and the Five Percenters.

== Bibliography ==
- The History of the Nation of Islam Vol. 1: The Pioneer Years (1930-1950). A-Team Publishing. 2014. ISBN 978-0983379744.
- In the Name of Allah Vol. 1: A History of Clarence 13X and the Five Percenters. A-Team Publishing. 2009. ISBN 978-0982161814.
- In the Name of Allah Vol. 2: A History of Clarence 13X and the Five Percenters. A-Team Publishing. 2009. ISBN 978-0982161821.
- The Naked Truth from the Goal Mind of Abu Shahid the Elder of the Nation of Gods and Earths, as Told to and Compiled by Wakeel Allah. A-Team Publishing. 2008. ISBN 978-0982161807.
- The Nation of Islam's Temple #7 Harlem USA: My Years with Malcolm and Farrakhan. A-Team Publishing. 2011. ISBN 978-0983379706.
