= Twelve Jewels of Islam =

The Twelve Jewels of Islam in the Nation of Gods and Earths is a variant of the Supreme Alphabet and Supreme Mathematics that the group's members use to understand the meaning of the universe. All three systems comprise the Universal Language. These jewels are also shared by The Nation of Islam.

== The twelve principles ==
1. Knowledge
2. Wisdom
3. Understanding
4. Freedom
5. Justice
6. Equality
7. Food
8. Clothing
9. Shelter
10. Love
11. Peace
12. Happiness
