= Clarence 13X =

Founder of the Five-Percent Nation

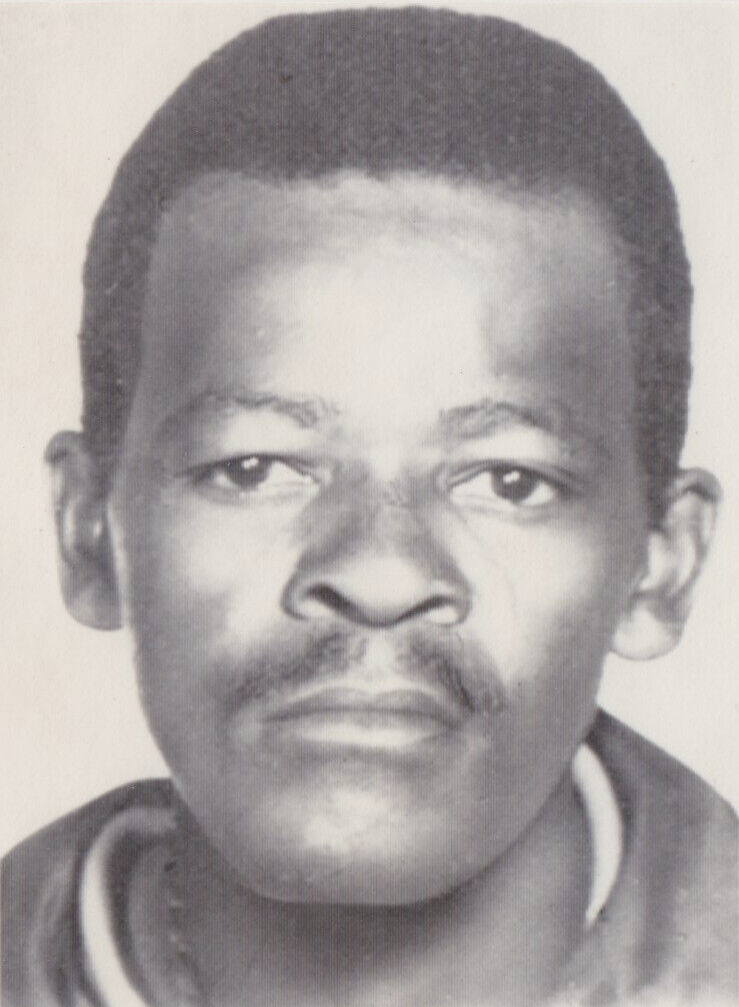
- Clarence 13X c. 1969
- Born: Clarence Edward Smith; February 22, 1928; Danville, Virginia, U.S.
- Died: June 13, 1969 (aged 41); New York City, U.S.
- Cause of death: Assassination by gunshot
- Other names: Allah the Father, Father Allah
- Known for: Founding the Five-Percent Nation
- Spouse: Dora Smith
- Partner: Willieen Jowers
- Children: 2

Clarence Edward Smith (February 22, 1928 – June 13, 1969), later known as Clarence 13X (Note: The "X" replaced his surname, considered by the Nation of Islam to be a "slave name", and the "13" indicated that he was the thirteenth member named Clarence to join the group. (Knight 2007, p. 34)) and Allah the Father, (Note: He was also nicknamed "Pudding"; the name's origin is unknown: it may have been given as a childhood nickname or in recognition of his smooth verbal skills as an adult. (Haddad 1994, p. 113)) was an American leader and the founder of the Five-Percent Nation, officially the Nation of Gods and Earths (NGE/NOGE).

Born in Virginia, Clarence 13X moved to New York City in his youth before serving in the United States Army during the Korean War. After returning to New York, he learned that his wife had joined the Nation of Islam (NOI) and followed her, serving as a security officer, martial arts instructor, and student minister before leaving for an unclear reason in 1963. He enjoyed gambling, which was condemned by the NOI, and disagreed with the divinity of Wallace Fard Muhammad.

Clarence 13X, who by then had taken the designation "Allah", eventually formed what would become the Five-Percent Nation, its name referencing his previous faith's belief that only five percent of the population knew and promoted the truth about God. The Five Percenters pioneered novel interpretations of pre-existing NOI teachings, claiming all black men to be their nation's "gods", with women taking the role of submissive "earths" that complemented and nurtured them. They also ascribed special meanings to letters and numerals – their understanding was said to provide deep truths about God and the universe – and rejected the NOI's strict behavioral guidelines while freely consuming alcohol and at times illegal drugs.

In 1964, Clarence 13X survived an attempted assassination. Several months later, he rallied his followers to vandalize stores. A scuffle with the police led to his arrest and confinement in psychiatric care, where he was diagnosed with paranoid schizophrenia. He was released from custody when a 1966 ruling by the Supreme Court placed limits on confinement without trial. Although initially teaching his followers to hate white people, Clarence 13X eventually began to cooperate with white city leaders, who funded a night school he established in return for agreements to prevent violence in Harlem.

Another unknown assailant fatally shot Clarence 13X in June 1969. New York City mayor John Lindsay and several other prominent leaders expressed condolences to him and the Five Percenters. Although the movement briefly faltered amidst his death, they rebounded after new leadership emerged on a non-hierarchical approach.

== Early life and Nation of Islam ==
Clarence Edward Smith was born on February 22, 1928, and raised in Danville, Virginia, with his five brothers and one sister. During his childhood, Virginia was racially segregated, and he witnessed incidents of racism, including a fight between his father and a white man that was sparked by racial tensions. In 1946, he moved with his mother to New York City, where they settled in Harlem. He attended only two years of high school.

Smith fathered two children, Clarence (born 1949) and Otis (born 1951), with Willieen Jowers. He also married Dora Smith in 1950. He also had several sons and daughters with Dora. Smith joined the U.S. Army in the early 1950s and was stationed in Korea from 1952 to 1954, where he served as an infantryman in the Korean War. After returning to the U.S., he lived in Harlem and served in the United States Army Reserve until 1960. During his military service, he became skilled in karate.

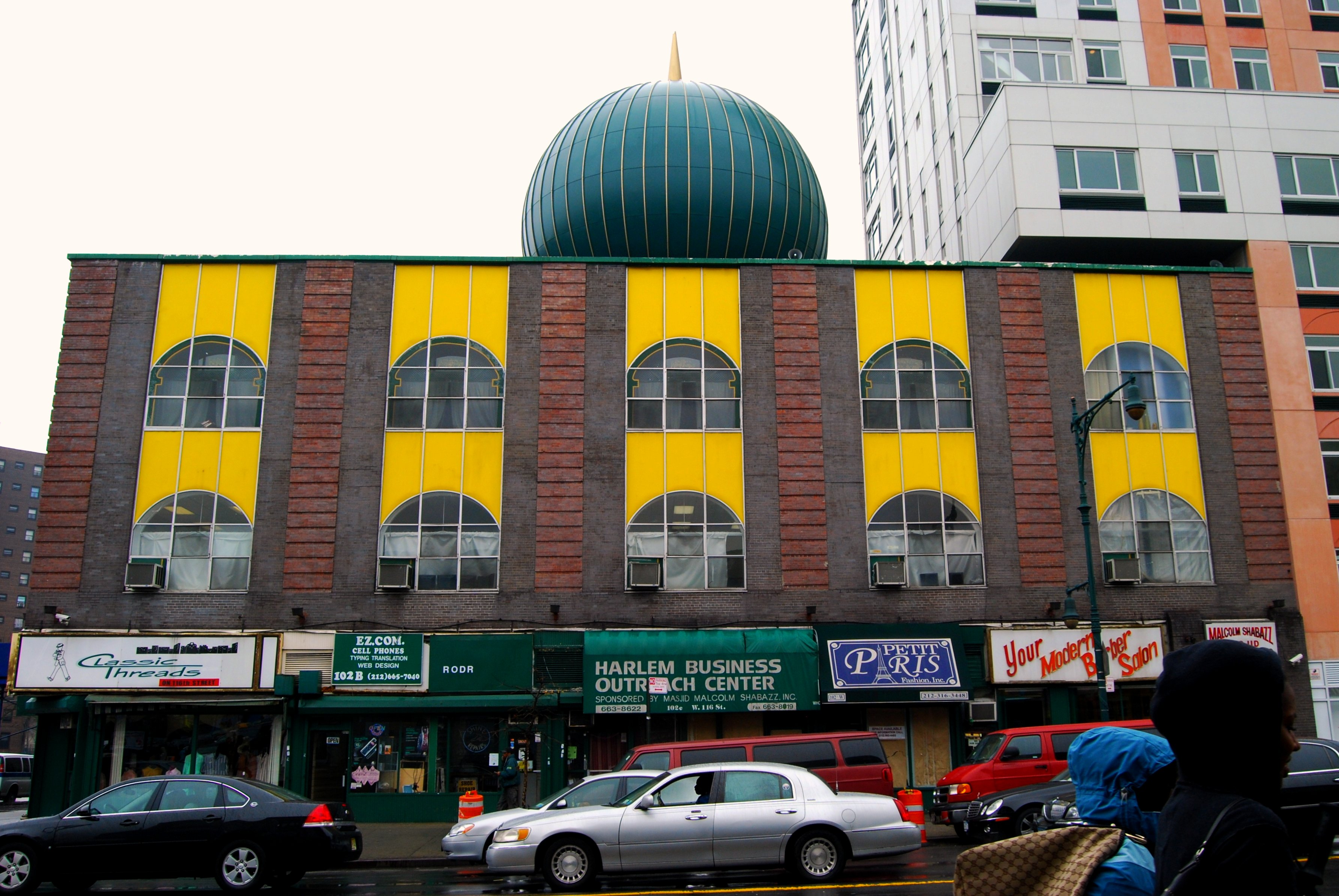
Mosque No. 7 in Harlem, 2009

Dora Smith embraced the Nation of Islam (NOI) while her husband was away and he converted after returning to New York. By 1961, he had registered at Mosque No. 7 and changed his name to Clarence 13X in accordance with NOI practice. Before his conversion, he often smoked marijuana and gambled, activities forbidden by the NOI. After joining the group, he studied the NOI's doctrines and quickly progressed within their organizational structure, possibly thanks to skills learned in the military. His responsibilities included teaching martial arts and serving on the Fruit of Islam security team. He was recognized as a skilled speaker and reached the rank of "student minister" at Mosque No. 7. By 1963, he had come to the attention of the FBI—informants recorded his presence at rallies led by Malcolm X.

The early 1960s were a turbulent period for the NOI. Unrest was caused by conflicts between leaders Elijah Muhammad and Malcolm X. Around that time, Clarence 13X became disenchanted with the organization, although the root of his qualms is not known. NOI members have offered contradictory accounts of the events that caused his exit and whether he left voluntarily. His departure has been variously attributed to doubts about the NOI's theology, violations of their moral code, objections to the luxurious lifestyles of their senior leadership, or Malcolm X's distrust of him. Dora Smith elected to stay with the group, prompting the couple's separation.

Before leaving the NOI, Clarence 13X had begun to doubt their teaching that Wallace Fard Muhammad was a divine messenger. He believed that the NOI's teachings were contradictory because they taught that God is black, but encouraged reverence of Fard Muhammad, who was not of exclusively African descent. Clarence 13X concluded that divinity was found in all black men, rather than in a single person. Several times before he left the NOI, he was censured by the leadership for these assertions. His friend John 37X elected to leave with him. Malcolm X left the NOI in 1963 and remained on good terms with Clarence 13X. Clarence 13X did not join Malcolm X's newly created group, Muslim Mosque, Inc.

== Founding the Five Percenters ==
After leaving the NOI, Clarence 13X and John 37X continued to study the group's teachings, sometimes while smoking marijuana. They assumed new names: 13X took Allah, and 37X, Abu Shahid. (Note: In Arabic, the name "Allah" means "God"; "Shahid" means "witness". (Knight 2007, p. 49)) After reading an NOI book with 34 riddles, known as the "Lost-Found Lessons", 37X concluded that numbers represented specific concepts, such as knowledge or wisdom. He referred to this system as "living mathematics". During its development, he was imprisoned on firearms charges.

While 37X was in prison, 13X taught a system of beliefs he referred to as "supreme wisdom", which he saw as the core of Islam, to groups of young men. He was assisted by his friend James Howard, with whom he developed a modified version of living mathematics, "supreme mathematics", and an accompanying doctrine about letters, the "supreme alphabet". The development of these systems, considered a "divine science" by adherents, may have been influenced by the teachings of Sufism. Like some schools of Sufism, they found esoteric meanings in the alphabet. David Smydra of The Boston Globe compares these teachings to Kabbalah. Felicia Miyakawa of Middle Tennessee State University sees similarities to Gnosticism and Kemetism.

Clarence 13X ascribed novel teachings, assigning backronyms to familiar words. He stated that the letters of the word "Allah" stood for "arm, leg, leg, arm, head", signifying the human body. This was said to prove that humanity held a divine nature. He named parts of the New York area after locations in the Middle East that are significant to Islam: Harlem was referred to as Mecca, and Brooklyn as Medina. Other disaffected NOI members, including some who served the Fruit of Islam, were soon drawn to his burgeoning group. Several people from the NOI who were unwilling to choose between loyalty to Elijah Muhammad and Malcolm X also joined. Clarence 13X incorporated aspects of the theology taught by the feuding leaders.

In the group's early years, some Five Percenters attended NOI events. Clarence 13X's theology had much in common with the teachings of the NOI, although there were notable differences. He taught his followers that he was an incarnation of God, and they each were gods. His followers were thus encouraged to look within themselves in their search for God. Clarence 13X taught that there was an inherent greatness in those of African descent not found in Europeans and their descendants, echoing statements made by Elijah Muhammad.

Clarence did not enforce the NOI's strict moral rules: One way that the group appealed to potential converts was by allowing many practices condemned by the NOI, including gambling, alcohol consumption, and drug use. Clarence 13X told his followers to avoid developing addictions, but that drug use was not inherently wrong. He strictly forbade the consumption of pork, arguing that pigs were similar to animals that are not eaten in the United States, such as rats and dogs, and hence should not be consumed. Owing to their belief that black men are gods, the group allowed its members to make choices about clothing and most aspects of diet.

Early members of the group often proselytized on street corners for hours. Clarence 13X's assistants led classes about the group's teachings, strictly enforcing study habits. He instructed his followers to memorize his teachings about the significance of numbers and letters. Once they did so, they were said to gain an understanding of profound truths. These lessons were taught in a form that resembled catechisms. Rather than hold services in mosques, they gathered for monthly meetings known as parliaments, which were often held outdoors. Attendees were given wide freedom to speak in a system that Ted Swedenburg of the University of Arkansas has compared to Quaker meetings.

Clarence 13X's group was initially known as the "Suns of Almighty God Allah" or the "Blood Brothers". After Malcolm X's death, the group became known as the "Five Percenters" or the "Five Percent Nation". The name was drawn from the NOI's claim to be the five percent of the black community who knew and promoted the truth about God. Clarence 13X considered his movement to be the five percent of the NOI that still held to truth and integrity. The other 95 percent were said to be unaware of the truth or corrupt.

Clarence 13X assembled an inner circle of assistants, nine of whom are referred to by Five Percenters as the "First Born": they are said to embody his attributes. The assistants were assigned to spread the group's teachings to younger people, many of whom took African names, including some from non-Islamic societies. Clarence 13X taught Afrocentrism to his disciples and often wore a dashiki. Male Five Percenters members frequently wore tasseled kufis, and female members wore colorful African head wraps. Some Five Percenters supported themselves via drug dealing and petty theft. Others intentionally committed minor legal infractions, hoping to proselytize to others who had been arrested.

Clarence 13X's followers saw him as a divine messenger and referred to him as "Father Allah". This elevated him to a higher position than Elijah Muhammad, who had deemed himself the "Messenger of Allah". Eventually, Clarence 13X stopped identifying himself as a Muslim, and spoke out against the reverence of Fard Muhammad, casting him as a "mystery God". He rejected the idea that God is invisible, which he felt weakened people. He encouraged his followers to learn about and respect other spiritual traditions.

Female converts were initially referred to as "nurses". Clarence 13X renamed them "earths" in 1967. He taught that women were not gods, as he believed that they were created by man and did not possess creative power. In his view, women could nurture, but only men could make children. Women were said to resemble the Earth in their ability to sustain life. Clarence 13X had a patriarchal philosophy, and the Five Percenters were initially overwhelmingly male. He spoke in favor of fathers' arranging their daughters' marriages and told women to embody submission by serving their husbands as God. Polygamy or serial monogamy was allowed, and legal marriage was discouraged. Clarence 13X encouraged his followers to have many children and discouraged the use of birth control.

== Opposition ==
NOI leaders were angry that Clarence 13X freely taught portions of their doctrine that they only revealed to committed members. Although one of their captains repeatedly asked him to stop, Clarence refused. Clarence 13X also experienced conflict within his family: his children did not revere him, and hostility quickly developed between core Five Percenters and some of his sons when Willeen Jowers brought them to visit him.

On December 9, 1964, Clarence 13X was shot twice in the torso, while at a popular gathering place in the basement of a Harlem tenement. He was brought to Harlem Hospital, where he was treated and released. He later claimed that he died and returned to his body a short time later. In a 2007 study of the Five Percent movement, American journalist Michael Muhammad Knight speculates that this caused his followers to see him as a Christ figure. The identity and motivation of the shooter are unknown. Knight notes that law enforcement and rival Muslim groups both had a motive to attack Clarence 13X. Some Five Percenters have speculated that the attack was part of a robbery attempt or retaliation for unpaid gambling debts. Clarence 13X's companions reported that he instructed them not to seek revenge on the shooter and to forswear violence. While recuperating from his wounds, Clarence 13X sought to distinguish his movement from other Islamic movements, abandoning Arabic greetings for English expressions.

The Five Percenters soon attracted attention from media and law enforcement. Local papers published negative coverage of the group, describing them as a violent hate group or a street gang. The New York Amsterdam News reported that Clarence 13X had threatened to kill white children if his group did not receive a government subsidy. In 1965, the FBI initiated an investigation of his group and may have provided sensationalized rumors to the press. That year, FBI director J. Edgar Hoover described Clarence 13X as a "Harlem rowdy", and feared that he would form ties with more dangerous groups. The FBI developed a detailed file on Clarence 13X. In 1967, Hoover described him as a potential threat to President Lyndon B. Johnson, and sent a detailed folder about him to the United States Secret Service.

== Arrest ==
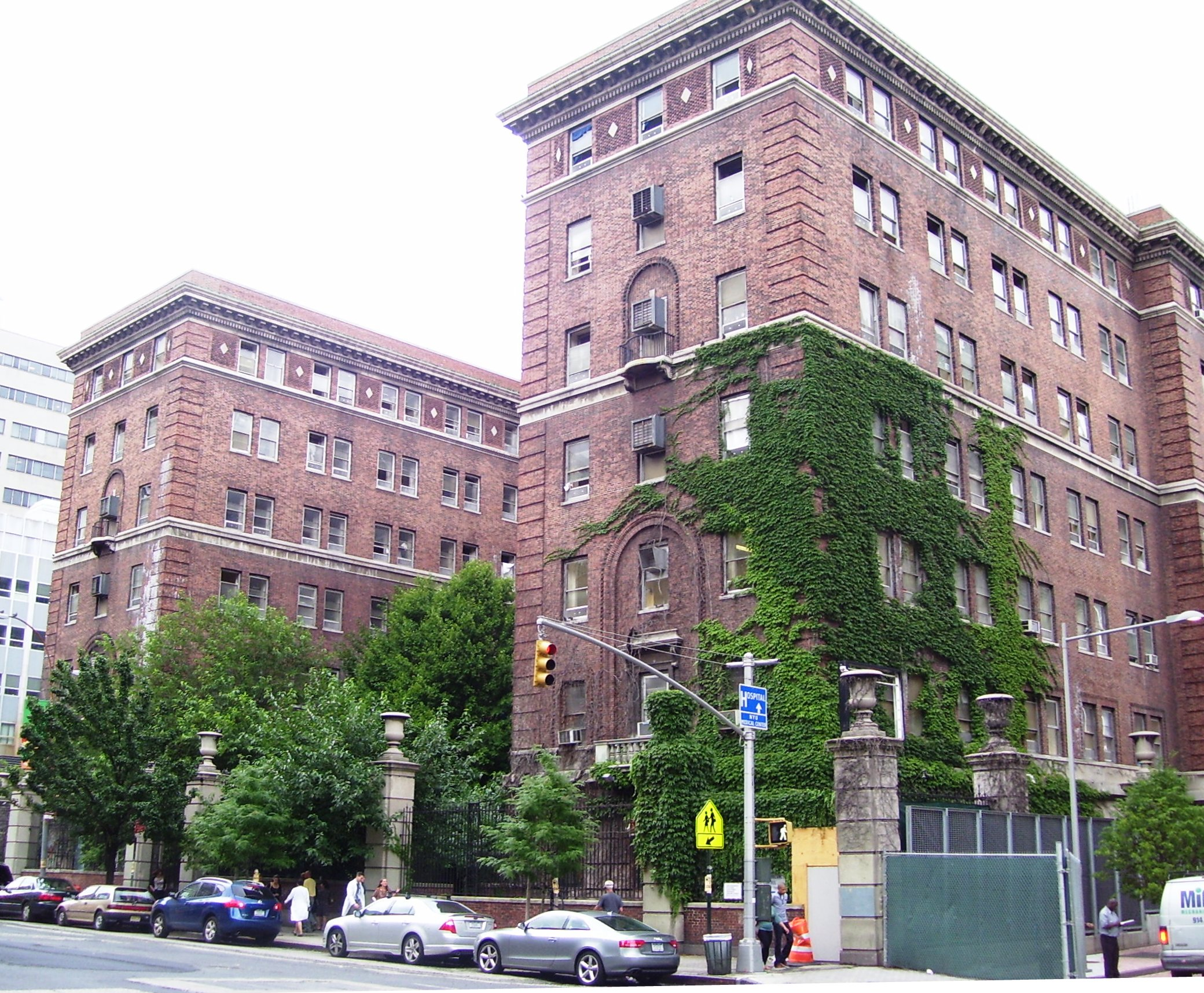
Bellevue Psychiatric Hospital

After Malcolm X's death in 1965, Clarence 13X mourned his loss but did not attend his funeral. In May 1965, while visiting the site of Mosque No. 7, then closed, 13X and several of his companions were told to leave by a police officer. They left, and began to vandalize nearby buildings, and blocked the street near the former headquarters of Muslim Mosque, Inc. More police arrived and subdued 13X after an altercation, bringing him into custody with several of his followers. After being arrested, he refused to identify himself and was charged with assault and drug possession.

About 60 of his followers attended his arraignment, but were removed from the court after shouting "Peace". 13X proclaimed his innocence and announced his intent to defend himself in court. He told the judge that he was Allah, and that the city would face grave judgment if he were not released. The judge disregarded his prognostication and set his bail at $9,500.

At a court date in June, about 50 Five Percenters protested outside the court. Afterwards, several were arrested on charges of making Molotov cocktails. In July, the court sent 13X to Bellevue Hospital Center for a psychiatric examination. While in the hospital, he made a few disciples and communicated with some followers through a hospital window. Under his instructions, Five Percenters resisted future NOI leader Louis Farrakhan's attempts to convert them.

Knight states that 13X's psychiatric results were not processed for an unusually long time. He posits that the delay was due to FBI involvement and argues that 13X was a political prisoner. In November 1965, 13X was ruled incompetent to stand trial, and committed to the New York State Department of Mental Hygiene, which placed him at the Matteawan State Hospital for the Criminally Insane. After he declared himself Allah and a "Master Gambler", the doctors concluded that he had schizophrenic reaction, paranoid type with delusions of grandeur. He faced indefinite commitment. Many Five Percenters and their converts traveled to the hospital to meet with him and receive instruction. He proselytized to fellow inmates, converting one young white man, who later became a committed follower.

While 13X was in prison, the Five Percenters continued to proselytize and teach their doctrines. He instructed his followers to adopt names different from those used in the NOI, to differentiate their group. After attaining a certain degree of knowledge of the group's doctrines, members were allowed to adopt the surname "Allah" and sometimes "God" as a first name. This was in recognition of 13X's teachings that black men were gods, and that each member should worship himself. His followers often took the name Allah, but refrained from referring to themselves as such in Clarence's presence, in deference to his authority. After a 1966 decision (Pate v. Robinson) by the Supreme Court of the United States, limits were placed on the confinement of mentally ill criminals, causing many to be released. 13X was consequently released in March 1967.

== Cooperation and conflict ==
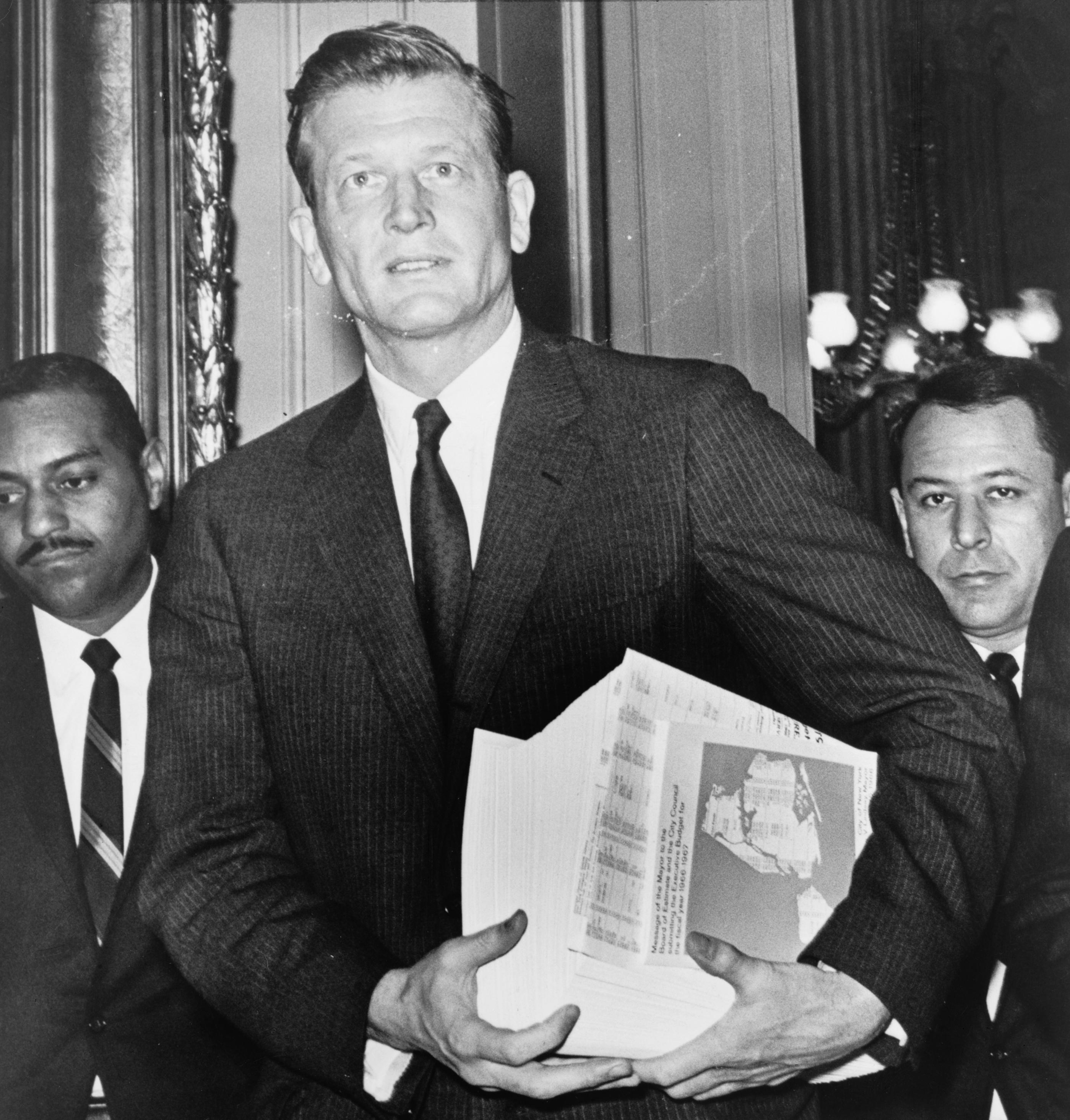
New York City mayor John Lindsay, 1966

In mid-1967, New York City mayor John Lindsay sought to develop closer ties with leaders of impoverished neighborhoods. Prompted in part by concerns voiced by the New York Police Department (NYPD), the mayor dispatched one of his aides, Barry Gottehrer, to meet with Clarence 13X. Belying his fearsome reputation, Clarence 13X had a congenial meeting with Gottehrer, during which he requested more bus routes and school funding. Clarence 13X subsequently attended a meeting of black leaders at Gracie Mansion, the mayor's official residence.

The city provided buses for Five Percenters to travel to a Long Island park, and with help from the National Urban League, obtained an abandoned storefront for use as a school. It became known as the Allah School in Mecca and aimed to prepare young people for college preparatory schools. Tensions soon formed between the Five Percenters and the school's administrators. Clarence 13X desired more control over the curriculum and had difficulty finding qualified teachers. Police regularly visited the school to ensure that the students were not being radicalized.

In 1975, Gottehrer chronicled his friendship with Clarence 13X in The Mayor's Man. The book was well received by some Five Percenters, who republished portions of it, after it went out of print. They have not reprinted the entire book, owing to a passage in which Gottehrer relates that Clarence 13X offered to allow him to sleep with his teenage daughter.

In February 1968, Lindsay estimated that there were about 500 to 700 Five Percenters. Some of Clarence 13X's followers attempted to create break-away groups, proclaiming themselves prophets and starting their own movements. They generally retained aspects of Five Percenter doctrine with different emphases.

After the assassination of Martin Luther King Jr. in April 1968, Lindsay feared that rioting would occur in Harlem. He traveled to the neighborhood to express condolences. Clarence 13X and his followers were among those who accompanied him as he walked the streets. Clarence 13X instructed his followers to try to prevent violence and looting. He was commended by the city's leadership for his efforts, and they subsequently agreed to help him publish a book of Five Percenter teachings and portions of the Quran.

Willieen Jowers recalled that Clarence 13X admitted that his previous teachings about racial hatred were wrong around this time. He later described himself as "neither anti-white nor pro-black" and saw some of his white contacts with the city as allies in the advancement of his teachings. His white convert was released from state custody and joined his teacher in Harlem during the February 1969 nor'easter. He was accepted as a Five Percenter, as Clarence 13X maintained that "civilization"—rather than race—was valued by the group. Clarence 13X made possibly contradictory statements about whether white individuals could be reformed.

Contrary to his radical reputation, Clarence endorsed some conservative positions in the late 1960s, including capital punishment, respect for the U.S. flag, and American involvement in Vietnam. He allowed his supporters to attend Christmas celebrations. Knight notes that these shifts may have been intended to decrease suspicions of law enforcement. Clarence 13X was then allowed to visit a juvenile detention center to speak to young Five Percenters and won some concessions from the institution's leadership. Some secular black leaders disliked him, owing to his supportive comments about the mayor and neglect of revolutionary rhetoric. On one occasion, he was invited to address an audience of black Marxists, then spoke to them about numerology.

Around 1968, Clarence 13X fathered a son with a young convert named Gusavia. That year, Gloria Steinem published an article about Clarence 13X in New York magazine. She blamed the NOI for the previous attempt to kill Clarence, arguing that they were angered by his claim to be Allah and thus above Elijah Muhammad. Clarence 13X also received coverage from international media, including a Canadian television program.

== Assassination ==
By 1969, Clarence 13X was sleeping little. He feared that he would be killed, and instructed his followers to remain strong if he died. On June 12, he spent time with several of his disciples at their school. He left the school between 2:00 and 3:00 am on June 13 and then gambled for an hour or two. As was his occasional practice, he traveled to Dora Smith's house to rest. He was ambushed by three assailants, who fatally shot him while he was in the lobby of her apartment building, at 21 West 112th Street in Harlem, within the Martin Luther King Jr. Towers housing project. That morning, several people from the mayor's office met with his family. The mayor later visited the Five Percenters' school to express condolences.

Clarence 13X's funeral was held four days after his death. It was attended by about 400 people and was followed by a procession through Harlem. His death put the leadership of his movement in question—there was no clear successor. At that time, his followers were primarily teenagers, and several of his top leaders subsequently struggled with drug addiction.

Most local media sources gave Clarence 13X positive coverage in the wake of his death. The Daily News connected his murder with the recent death of NOI activist Charles Kenyatta, casting them as part of a "Muslim War". The mayor believed that the NYPD told them this and was angered by their claim. Louis Farrakhan denied culpability, maintaining that he had good relations with Clarence 13X. NYPD investigators suspected that he was killed by members of an extortion ring, possibly connected to the Fair Play for Cuba Committee. In August 1969, an arrest was made in connection with his murder. The suspect denied involvement, and charges were soon dropped. Five Percenters have posited different culprits, including the CIA, the NOI, or a disgruntled follower.

== Legacy and reception ==
Five Percenter membership plunged after Clarence 13X's death, but rebounded in 1970 after new leadership emerged and revitalized the group. After his death, the group was not dominated by a single leader. This may have been a result of their teaching that all black men are gods, which rendered authoritarian leadership untenable.

Knight doubts that Clarence 13X set out to build a movement or a culture, but after his death, the movement expanded and gained converts across the United States. Five Percenters have celebrated Clarence 13X's birthday as a holiday, and minimized the descriptions of his flaws in their accounts of his life. Numerous apocryphal stories from his life have circulated among the group. Some accounts claim that he gambled, only as a means to reach others with his teachings. He did not leave behind a record of his teachings, and the group had few formalized tenets at the time of his death. In the following decades, the group's doctrine became more complicated.

Akbar Muhammad of the NOI described Clarence 13X as "confused". Relations between the Five Percenters and NOI leaders have improved over time. Clarence 13X's teachings may have influenced the doctrines of Dwight York, founder of the Nuwaubian Nation. York saw Clarence 13X's teachings as an insufficient, incomplete path.

Lawyer Sidney Davidoff, one of Lindsay's assistants, deemed Clarence 13X "a little bit snake-oil salesman and a little bit crazy, but no more unstable than anyone else preaching a gospel on the street corner." Davidoff saw Clarence 13X's black supremacist teachings as a way to instill confidence in young people. Knight states that Clarence 13X went from a "'Harlem rowdy' to [a] legitimate community leader". Lindsay later cast Clarence 13X's role in the city as similar to that of Al Sharpton.

== See also ==
- God complex
- List of founders of religious traditions
- List of unsolved murders (1900–1979)

== Works cited ==
Books

- Allen, Ernest (1996). William Eric Perkins (ed.). Droppin' Science: Critical Essays on Rap Music and Hip Hop Culture. Temple University Press. ISBN 978-1-56639-362-1.
- Evanzz, Karl (2011). The Messenger: The Rise and Fall of Elijah Muhammad. Random House. ISBN 978-0-307-80520-1.
- Gardell, Mattias (1996). In the Name of Elijah Muhammad: Louis Farrakhan and The Nation of Islam. Duke University Press. ISBN 978-0-8223-1845-3.
- Haddad, Yvonne (1994). Muslim Communities in North America. SUNY Press. ISBN 978-0-7914-2020-1.
- Jackson, John L. (2005). Real Black: Adventures In Racial Sincerity. University of Chicago Press. ISBN 978-0-226-39001-7.
- Knight, Michael Muhammad (2007). The Five Percenters: Islam, Hip Hop and the Gods of New York. Oneworld Publications. ISBN 978-1-85168-513-4.
- Miyakawa, Felicia M. (2005). Five Percenter Rap: God Hop's Music, Message, And Black Muslim Mission. Indiana University Press. ISBN 978-0-253-34574-5.
- Miyakawa, Felicia (2010). "Receiving, Embodying, and Sharing 'Divine Wisdom': Women in the Nation of Gods and Earths". In Lillian Ashcraft-Eason; Darnise C. Martin; Oyeronke Olademo (eds.). Women and New and Africana Religions. ABC-CLIO. ISBN 978-0-275-99156-2.
- Palmer, Susan J. (2010). The Nuwaubian Nation: Black Spirituality and State Control. Ashgate Publishing. ISBN 978-0-7546-6255-6.
- Reed, Monica (2010). Edward E. Curtis IV (ed.). Encyclopedia of Muslim-American History. Infobase. ISBN 978-1-4381-3040-8.
- Richardson, Elaine (2003). Understanding African American Rhetoric: Classical Origins to Contemporary Innovations. Routledge. ISBN 978-0-415-94386-4.
- Smith, Jane I. (1999). Islam in America. Columbia University Press. ISBN 978-0-231-10967-3.
- Williams, Juan; Dixie, Quinton Hosford (2003). This Far by Faith: Stories from the African American Religious Experience. HarperCollins. ISBN 978-0-06-093424-8.

Newspapers

- Smydra, David F. (December 21, 2003). "The Five-Percent rap". The Boston Globe.
- von Zielbauer, Paul (August 18, 2003). "Inmates Are Free to Practice Black Supremacist Religion in New York, a Judge Rules". The New York Times. Archived from the original on June 4, 2014.
