= Wesley Muhammad =

American historian

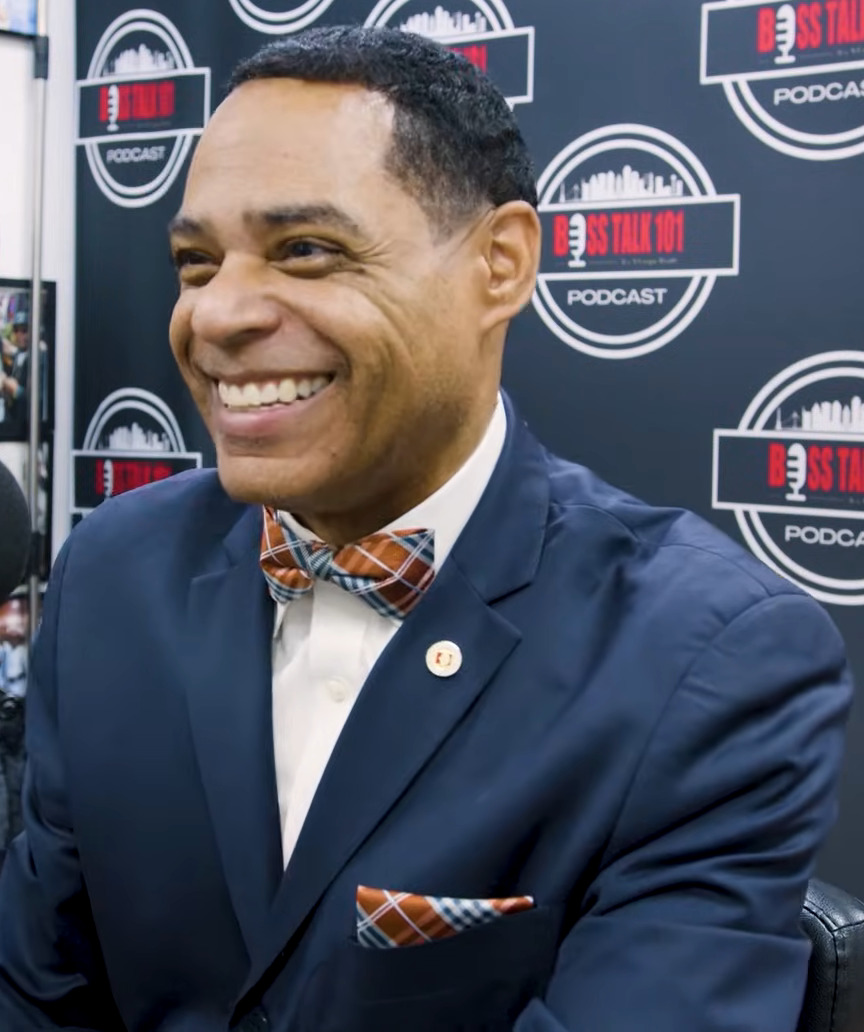
Muhammad in 2026

Wesley Muhammad is an American author and a minister in the Nation of Islam.

President of the Black Student Union in high school, Muhammad attended Morehouse College in Atlanta, where he joined the 5 Percenters and then became a Fruit of Islam while the Nation of Islam was under the leadership of Louis Farrakhan. Muhammad received a Bachelor of Arts in Religious Studies from Morehouse in Atlanta, graduating with honors in 1994. In 2003 he received a master's degree in Islamic studies from the University of Michigan (Ann Arbor), where he also received a Ph.D. in Islamic studies with a focus on early theological development in Islam.

Muhammad's research has been published in the International Journal of Middle East Studies, the Journal of the American Oriental Society, and the American Journal of Islamic Social Sciences. He has been an instructor on courses on Islamic studies, religious studies, African American religion, and Middle Eastern studies at the University of Toledo and Michigan State University.

In 2013 he was a scholarly aide to Louis Farrakhan at Nation of Islam National Headquarters, Mosque Maryam in Chicago.

In 2021 he made an appearance in the documentary Buck Breaking.

== Bibliography ==
- The Book of God: An Encyclopedia of Proof that the Black Man is God. A-Team Publishing. 2007. ISBN 978-0982161876.
- The Truth of God: The Bible, the Quran and the Secret of the Black God. A-Team Publishing. 2007. ISBN 978-0982161883.
- Black Arabia & the African Origin of Islam. A-Team Publishing. 2009. ISBN 978-0982161890.
- Egyptian Sacred Science and Islam: A Reappraisal. A-Team Publishing. 2012. ISBN 978-0983379751.
- The Religion of the Black God: Indic Sacred Science and Islam. A-Team Publishing. 2013. ISBN 978-0983379768.
- Take Another Look: The Quran, the Sunnah and the Islam of the Honorable Elijah Muhammad. A-Team Publishing. 2011. ISBN 978-0983379713.
- God's Black Prophets: Deconstructing the Myth of the White Muhammad of Arabia and Jesus of Jerusalem. A-Team Publishing. 2010. ISBN 978-0982161852.
- Bilad Al'Sudan: Essays on Islam, Africa and Afrocentricity. A-Team Publishing. 2012. ISBN 978-0983379737.
- Who is God?: The God Debates. A-Team Publishing. 2009. ISBN 978-0982161845.
- Master Fard Muhammad: Who is He? Who is He Not?. A-Team Publishing. 2009. ISBN 978-0982161838.
