= Beliefs of the Nation of Islam =

Flag of the Nation of Islam

The Nation of Islam (NOI) is a black nationalist religious group founded in the United States by Wallace Fard Muhammad in 1930. While it identifies itself as promoting a form of Islam, its beliefs differ considerably from mainstream Islamic traditions. Scholars of religion characterize it as a new religious movement. It operates as a centralized and hierarchical organization. It has been characterized by the Southern Poverty Law Center and the Anti-Defamation League as a black supremacist hate group.

The NOI teaches that there has been a succession of mortal gods, each a black man named Allah, of whom Fard Muhammad is the most recent. It claims that the first Allah created the earliest humans, the Arabic-speaking, dark-skinned Tribe of Shabazz, whose members possessed inner divinity and from whom all people of color are descended. It maintains that a scientist named Yakub then created the white race. The whites lacked inner divinity, and were intrinsically violent; they overthrew the Tribe of Shabazz and achieved global dominance. Setting itself against the white-dominated society of the United States, the NOI campaigns for the creation of an independent African American nation-state, and calls for African Americans to be economically self-sufficient and separatist. A millenarian tradition, it maintains that Fard Muhammad will soon return aboard a spaceship, the "Mother Plane" or "Mother Ship," to wipe out the white race and establish a utopia. Members worship in buildings called mosques or temples. Practitioners are expected to live disciplined lives, adhering to strict dress codes, specific dietary requirements, and patriarchal gender roles.

== Theology ==
God is a man and we just cannot make Him other than a man, lest we make Him an inferior one; for man's intelligence has no equal in other than man. His wisdom is infinite; capable of accomplishing anything that His brain can conceive.

— Elijah Muhammad, Message to the Black Man, 1965

The sociologist of religion David V. Barrett noted that the Nation's theology is "very distinct" and "extremely detailed". The Nation provides conflicting statements about its theology; although it professes commitment to the monotheistic idea of a single God, its discourse refers to multiple gods, meaning that it can be interpreted as polytheistic.

In the NOI's view, each Allah (God) is not an incorporeal spiritual entity but a flesh-and-blood person. These Allahs are anthropomorphic, taking the form of black men, which was the shape that the first Allah consciously adopted. In Nation teaching, the Allahs are not immortal, instead typically living for around 200 to 300 years. They have varying abilities and degrees of power, with each taking over following the death of their predecessor, after which they rule for a cycle in history. The Nation regards its founder, Wallace Fard Muhammad, as the latest of these Allahs, or "God in person". He is deemed the first to have attained the same powers as that of the earliest Allah, namely the ability to return the universe to its primordial darkness and then recreate it. The Nation teaches that although this founder disappeared in 1934, he would live for another 409 years.

Reflecting a belief in the inner divinity of humanity that is common among North America's black-oriented new religions, the Nation also promotes the idea that "God is man and man is God, that God has a presence inside human individuals." Accordingly, the NOI teaches that the black race, in its natural state, is divine, a "nation of Gods", with its second leader, Elijah Muhammad, espousing the view that "all Muslims are Allahs". According to the NOI, "knowledge of self" is key for black people to realize their inner divinity. The NOI thus maintains that by following its teachings, its adherents can recognize their inner godliness. In doing so, it stipulates, black people will also recognise that they have psychic powers; Elijah Muhammad for instance claimed telepathic abilities.

According to the scholars of religion Jason Eric Fishman and Ana Belén Soage, the Nation of Islam's theology is "completely divorced" from that of mainstream Islam. In the latter, God is a single, monotheistic entity, one that is eternal and non-anthropomorphic; Islam also stresses that there is a fundamental ontological divide between humanity and God, which is at odds with NOI teaching. Similarly conflicting with mainstream Islam is the NOI's claim that there is no afterlife; Elijah Muhammad wrote that "when you are dead, you are DEAD". Notions of Heaven, the Nation claims, are a lie used by white Christians to keep black people docile. Instead, Elijah Muhammad taught that there is no spiritual realm beyond the material universe.

== Cosmogony and the Tribe of Shabazz ==
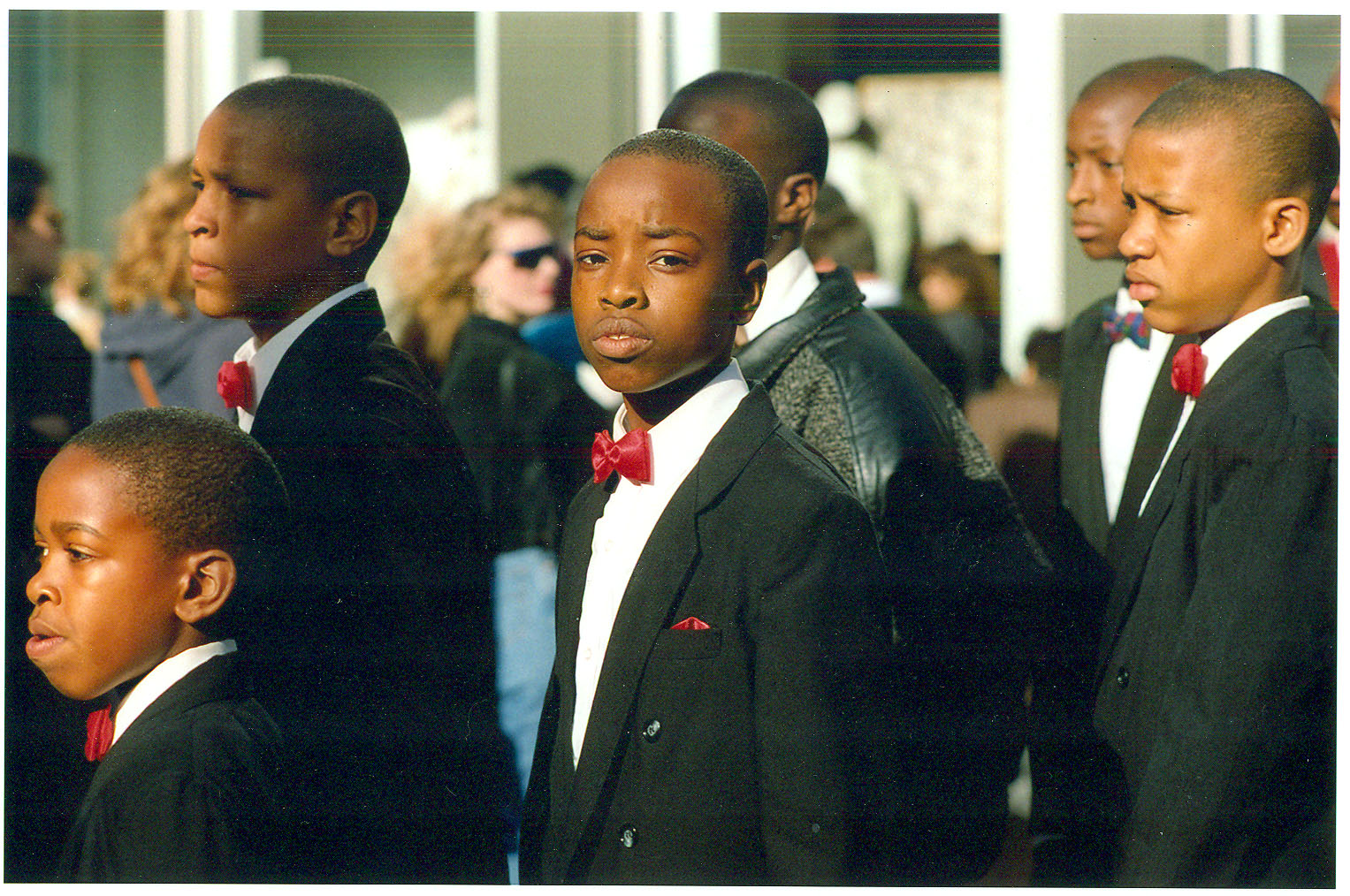
Young male members of the Nation of Islam in San Francisco in the 1990s

The Nation teaches that in the beginning there was nothing but darkness. Then, 76 trillion years ago, the first Allah willed himself into being, taking 6 million years to form into his desired appearance: that of a black man. This color chosen was a reference to the blackness from which he had emerged. The first Allah then created the Sun and the planets, as well as fellow black gods, who lived predominantly on the Earth but also on Mars. Of these, the first Allah and 23 others formed a council of ruling imams: 12 greater and 12 lesser. Each of these imams would take a turn being the ruling Allah for one cycle each.

The NOI refers to these early individuals as "god-scientists". They are part of what it calls the "Original" or "Asiatic" race, a people who were divided into 13 tribes. The Nation labels these people "black", describing them as having dark skin as well as smooth, straight hair, closely resembling dark-complexioned Arabians or South Asians rather than Sub-Saharan Africans. In portraying humanity as the creation of the first Allah, rather than a product of evolution, the Nation endorses a unique form of creationism and believes dinosaurs to be a hoax created by white scientists.

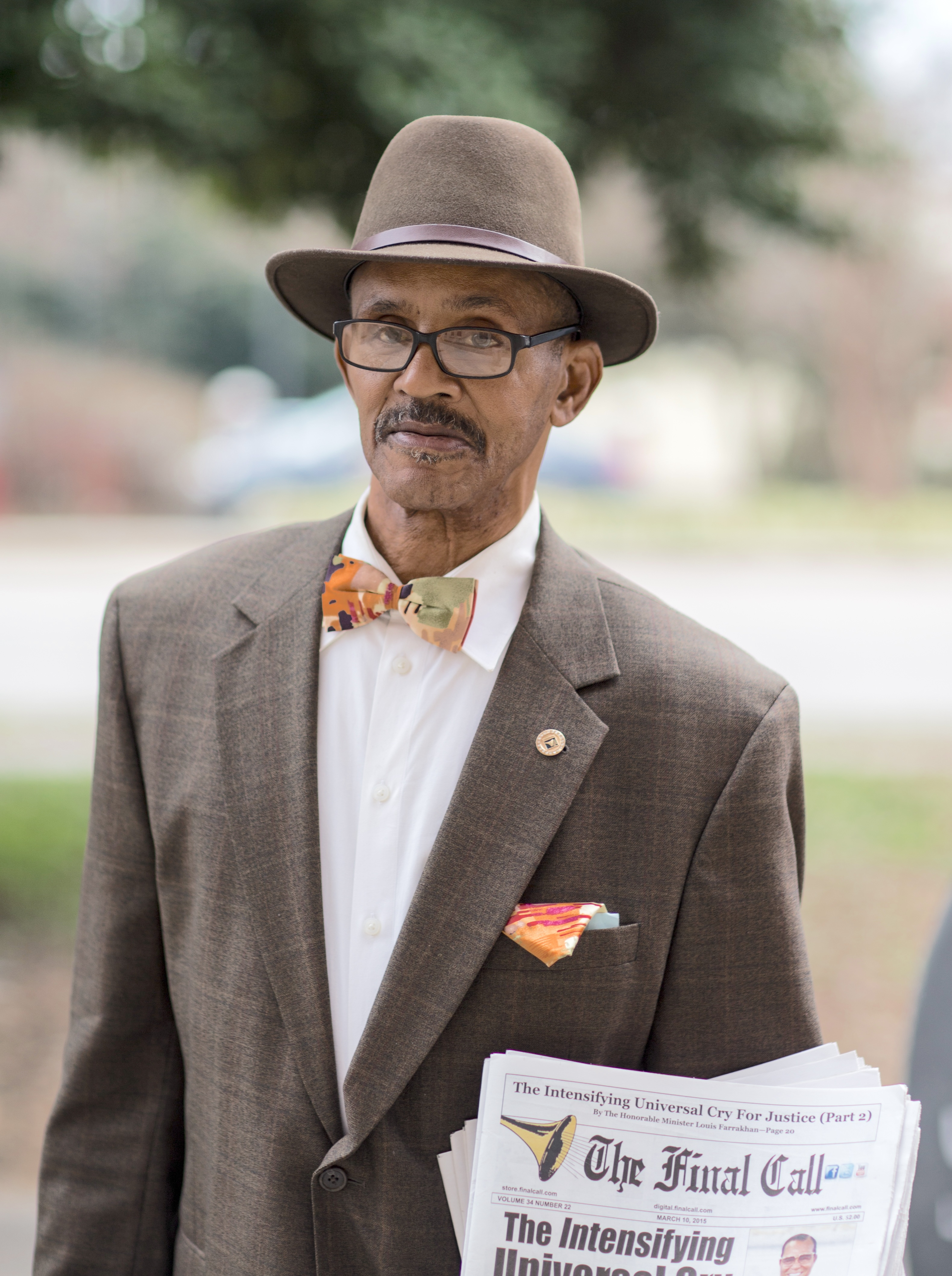
A male member of the Nation, selling the group's newspaper, in 2015

According to Nation teaching, one of the god-scientists was a renegade and, 66 trillion years ago, tried to destroy the Earth with explosives. The resulting explosion forced a chunk of the Earth's mass into orbit, where it became the moon. One of the 13 tribes was trapped on the moon, where they died due to lack of water. The Nation also maintains that 15,000 years ago, the god-scientists wrote down knowledge of the future in a text, the Mother Book, parts of which have passed down in the Torah, Gospels, and Quran.

Of the 12 tribes that remained on Earth, the most resilient was the Tribe of Shabazz, who settled in Egypt's Nile Valley and the area around Mecca in the Arabian peninsula. The Nation calls this region "East Asia", reflecting its belief that Asia and Africa were once a single continent. It was because they moved into the "jungles of East Asia" (i.e. Africa), Elijah Muhammad claimed, that members of this Original Asiatic Race developed Afro-textured hair. The Nation teaches that the Original Race were Muslims by their intrinsic nature, but that many created heretical deviations such as Hinduism; some of those who broke Islamic rules were exiled to North America, where they became the continent's native population.

For the Nation, everyone not of West European genetic origin is a descendant of the Original Asiatic Race. In contrast to understandings of race held by most Americans, for the Nation, "black" does not simply mean those of Sub-Saharan African genetic descent, but all people of color, including Asians, North Africans, and Native Americans. Even some Eastern Europeans, such as Albanians, are considered descendants of the Original Asiatic Race. Elijah Muhammad for instance referred to "black, brown, yellow [and] red" people as collectively constituting "black mankind", which he then juxtaposed against the "white race".

== Story of Yakub ==
The white race is not equal with darker people because the white race was not created by the God of Righteousness[...] Yakub, the father of the devil, made the white race, a race of devils[...] The white race is not made by nature to accept righteousness. They know righteousness, but they cannot be righteous.

— Elijah Muhammad, Our Savior Has Arrived, 1974

The NOI teaches a story about a figure known as Yakub. The story received its fullest exposition in Elijah Muhammad's 1965 book Message to the Blackman. In this narrative, Yakub was a black scientist; a child prodigy, by the age of 18 he had learned everything that Mecca's universities had to teach him. He attracted a following but caused trouble, leading the Meccan authorities to exile him and his 59,999 followers to Pelan, the Mediterranean island of Patmos.

On Pelan, the NOI claims, Yakub engaged in a selective breeding program to create the white race. This entailed breeding new children, with those who were too dark killed at birth and their bodies fed to wild animals or incinerated. Over several centuries, Yakub's experiments created a blonde, light-skinned people, the white race. The Nation maintains that most white people are unaware of their true origins, but that such knowledge is held by senior white Freemasons. The NOI teaches that, as a group of people distinct from the Original Asiatic Race, the white race are degenerate, sub-human, bereft of divinity, and intrinsically prone to lying, violence, and brutality. Elijah Muhammad repeatedly referred to whites as "the devil". Various academic commentators have characterised these views as racist.

According to the Nation's teachings, Yakub's newly created white race sowed discord among black people, and thus were exiled to live in the caves of "West Asia", meaning Europe. In this narrative, it was in Europe that the white race engaged in bestiality; their attempts to restore their blackness resulted in the creation of apes and monkeys. To help the whites develop, the ruling Allah sent prophets to them, the first of whom was Musa (Moses), who taught the whites to cook and wear clothes. According to the Nation, Jesus was also a prophet sent to civilise the white race. The group rejects the Christian belief that Jesus was a unique manifestation of God, that he was the Messiah, was the product of a virgin birth, or was crucified and resurrected.

== White rule and antisemitic conspiracism ==
God say you're the real devil. And you damn sure are. Ain't another devil nowhere else. Ain't no use you get mad with me, white people. You are the devil. The only hell-raiser on the earth. I'm not sayin' that you are responsible, 'cause you are made devil. But I'm not gonna make a mistake in thinkin' that you can be made better through love.

— Louis Farrakhan’s views on white people being the devil

In the Nation's teachings, the ruling Allah permitted the white race to rule the Earth for 6000 years. The whites subsequently began to dominate the world, using tactics that the Nation calls "tricknology". The group maintains that the ruling Allahs allowed this so that black people would discover humanity's inner potential for evil and learn how to defeat it, thus enabling them to realize their inner divine capacity. According to this teaching, the period of white rule came to an end in 1914.

During the era of white rule, the Nation states, the whites enslaved the Tribe of Shabazz, shipping many of them to the Americas. The NOI claims that most enslaved blacks forgot their true names, their Arabic language, and their Muslim identity, instead embracing Christianity, which the Nation labels "white man's religion". The group deems Christianity a tool of white supremacy used to subjugate black people, and expresses the belief that the oppressed (African Americans) and the oppressors (European Americans) cannot share the same god. The Nation claims that in their enslaved state, black people began engaging in sinful behaviour such as fornication and drinking alcohol, something encouraged by the whites. In making this argument, the NOI equates the United States with the city of Babylon, which in the Bible is presented as a symbol of oppression.

The Nation thus understands the modern subjugation of African Americans as part of an ancient white conspiracy. The group interprets many of the problems facing African Americans in this light; NOI leader Louis Farrakhan for instance claimed that the white establishment encouraged a black gang culture to provide an excuse for the police killing of black youths, that they flooded black-majority areas with drugs, and that they created AIDS to exterminate black people.

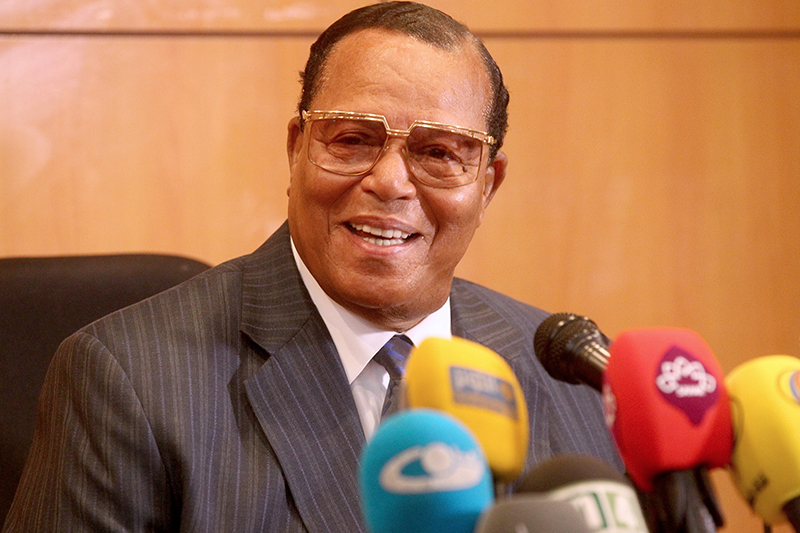
Farrakhan on a 2016 visit to Tehran, Iran; Farrakhan has repeatedly been accused of antisemitism

For Elijah Muhammad, white Jews were part of the white race and thus not intrinsically worse than other white people. Instead, he suggested that Orthodox Jews, by following the laws set down by Moses, had raised themselves to a higher spiritual level than most whites. In later years, accusations of antisemitism were repeatedly made against both Farrakhan and his NOI. Farrakhan promoted antisemitic tropes about a Jewish cabal controlling the US government, banking systems, universities, and entertainment sector. Elsewhere, Farrakhan called Judaism a "dirty religion", and described Adolf Hitler as a "very great man". Similarly, at a Kean College speech in 1993, NOI representative Khalid Abdul Muhammad referred to the "Jew-nited Nations" in "Jew York City" and stated that the Jewish people deserved Hitler.

NOI spokespersons have made claims linking Jews to conspiracy theories about vaccines, with the NOI health minister Abdul Alim Muhammad accusing Jewish doctors of injecting blacks with AIDS, and NOI official Ishmael Muhammad claiming that Jews were receiving different COVID-19 vaccines from other people. The group has also espoused the claim that Jews were disproportionately responsible for the Atlantic slave trade, promoting these ideas in its 1991 book, The Secret Relationship Between Blacks and Jews. It has also adopted an anti-Zionist position regarding Israel.

== Eschatology and the Mother Plane ==
The NOI is millenarian. It believes that humanity is living in end times, propounding a distinct eschatology drawing on the Book of Revelation. Central to its view of the apocalypse is a large spaceship, known as the Mother Plane, the Mother Ship, or the Wheel, and which members usually refer to using female pronouns. Elijah Muhammad described this as "a small human planet", claiming that it is half a mile in diameter. The Nation teaches that this vessel is the Merkabah that appears in the Book of Ezekiel (1:4–28). It maintains that Fard Muhammad/Allah and many of his scientists live aboard the Mother Plane, from which they monitor humanity; Farrakhan has claimed that Elijah Muhammad never died but is resident aboard this ship. The Nation teaches that there are also smaller vessels, "baby planes", docked inside the Mother Plane; these travel to Earth, resulting in reports of unidentified flying objects.

NOI members have repeatedly claimed that this apocalypse is imminent; in the early 1960s, Elijah Muhammad was predicting that it would occur in 1965 or 1966, Farrakhan later stated that the Gulf War of 1990 would spark it, while Tynetta Muhammad thought it would occur in 2001. According to Nation teaching, the apocalypse will come when the Mother Plane appears above the Earth and transports the righteous to live aboard it. It will then use the baby planes to bury bombs beneath the Earth's surface, which on detonation will wipe out the old, white-dominated order. Elijah Muhammad once stated that "There will be no such thing as elimination of all white people from the earth", for those who embrace Islam "can be saved". The NOI has taught that the white ruling elite are aware of this forthcoming apocalypse and that the US exploration of space and the Strategic Defense Initiative are futile attempts to protect themselves from the Mother Plane.

According to this account, after the bombs explode the Earth's atmosphere will burn for 390 years and spend another 610 cooling down. Once the Earth is again habitable, the ruling Allah will return the righteous to the planet, in a new black paradise. In his book The Supreme Wisdom, Elijah Muhammad claimed that after the apocalypse, "Peace, joy and happiness will have no end," with residents of this perfect society eating the finest food and wearing silk clothes interwoven with gold.

== Black nationalism and separatism ==
The NOI is black nationalist, with the idea of black unity being at the core of its ideology. The group seeks to empower black people by purging ideas they may have of white superiority and black inferiority. Instead, it maintains that the black race is superior and the white race inferior. The Nation is also black separatist, rejecting the integration of black and white people. This racial separatism put the NOI at odds with the civil rights movement of the 1950s and 1960s. The Nation was critical of African American activists who promoted racial integration, such as Martin Luther King Jr. and the National Association for the Advancement of Colored People (NAACP), calling them "Uncle Tom Negroes". The Nation's position that African American self-defence was a moral obligation similarly differed from the civil rights movement's focus on non-violent opposition to racial discrimination.

We want our people in America whose parents or grandparents are descendants from slaves to be allowed to establish a separate state or territory of their own, either on this continent or elsewhere. We believe that our former slave masters are obligated to provide such land and that the area must be fertile and minerally rich.

— Elijah Muhammad, 1965

The NOI has called for the creation of a sovereign African American nation-state in the southern part of what is currently the United States, with Elijah Muhammad stipulating that the US should financially support this new country for 20 to 25 years. This is presented as compensation for the unpaid labor of enslaved Africans. Farrakhan has also suggested that the countries of Africa should set aside land on that continent for the African diaspora, characterising this as a reparation for the complicity of West African states in the Atlantic slave trade. The scholar of religion Mattias Gardell suggested that any NOI-run nation-state would be theocratic and totalitarian.

Rejecting a Pan-African ideology, Elijah Muhammad and the NOI focused on African Americans rather than following the Garveyites and Rastafari in emphasising links between Africa and the African diaspora. Elijah Muhammad stated that "where as the Black man in Africa is our brother, our central responsibility is with the Black man here in the wilderness of North America". The NOI's origin myths present Mecca, not Africa, as the original home of African Americans, and its writings portray Africa itself as the least desirable of the Original Asiatic lands. The scholar of religion Michael Muhammad Knight argued that Elijah Muhammad "upheld white supremacist tropes" about African cultures. Elijah for instance complained of Africans' "savage dress and hair styles," forbade NOI members from imitating them, and stated that it was the Nation's job to "civilize Africa".

== Gender and sexuality issues ==
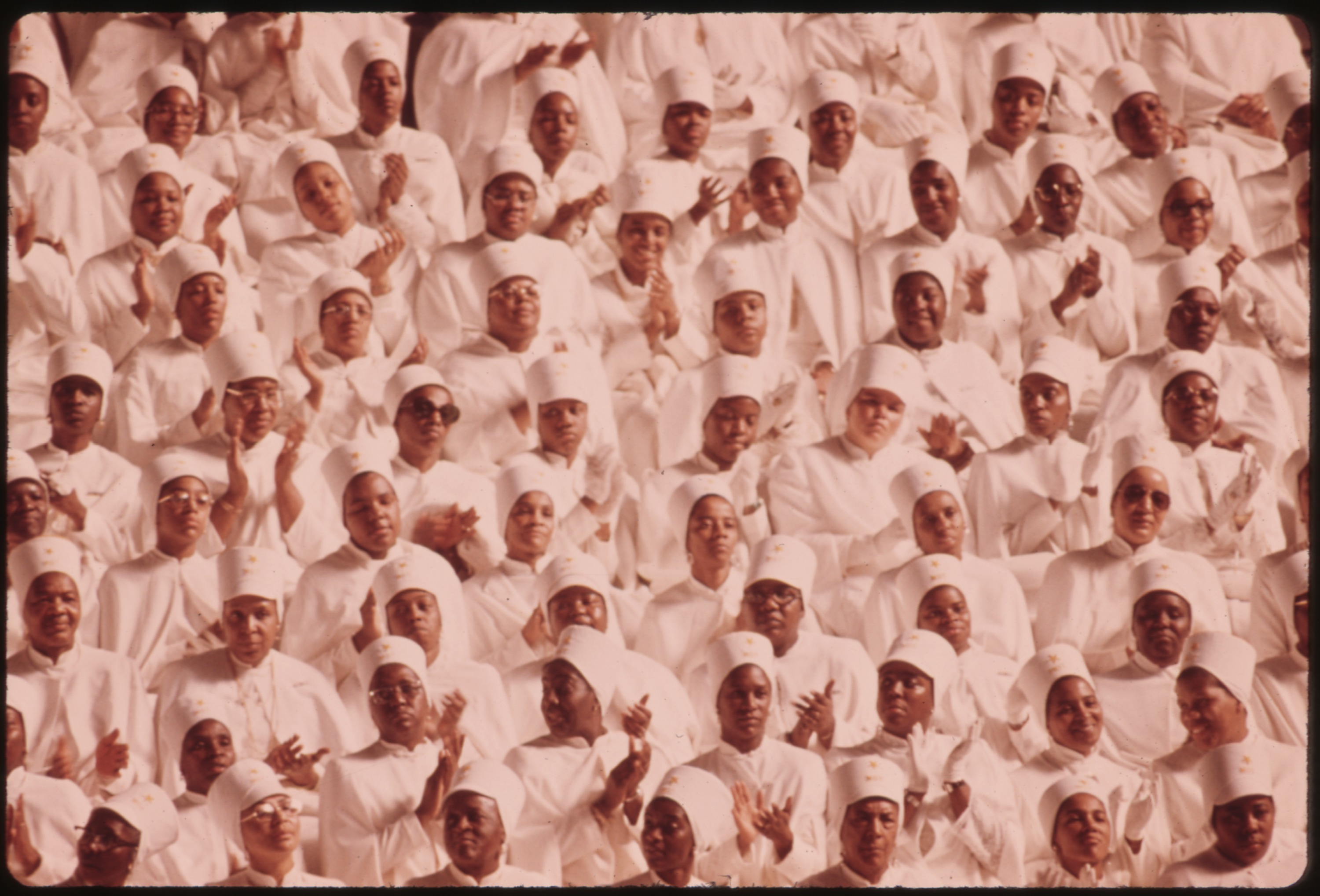
Women members of the NOI at a Savior's Day meeting in 1974. A women's outfit incorporating a headpiece and full-length garment covering the arms and legs was introduced in the 1930s, intended to preserve the wearer's modesty.

The NOI's teachings on gender are conservative and patriarchal, promoting strict gender roles. Emphasis is placed on the family unit, with the Nation maintaining that the security of the black family is ensured when its members adhere to their gendered responsibilities. The group is critical of the matrifocal focus of many African American families, instead stressing the importance of a male family figurehead. Men are encouraged to be economic providers for their family; women to be caretakers of the household and the children. Outsiders often perceive the Nation's women as victims of male oppression, and some ex-NOI women have complained of a repressive atmosphere in the group.

The NOI's leadership is overwhelmingly male. Despite this, Clara Muhammad led the group while Elijah Muhammad was incarcerated between 1942 and 1946, and during the 1990s several women rose to senior positions; in 1998 the Nation appointed its first woman minister, Ava Muhammad, as head of Mosque Number 15 in Georgia. Women have also been allowed leadership in the Muslim Girls Training group and in the NOI's schools and businesses, with various NOI women playing an active role in their communities.

The NOI enforces heterosexual monogamy and encourages sexual abstinence prior to marriage. Despite the group's formal opposition to polygyny, Elijah Muhammad had sexual relations with multiple women, whom Farrakhan has called his "wives"; the group states that this was permitted because Elijah was God's messenger. Nation members are encouraged to wed other members, although marriage to non-members is permitted. The NOI stipulates that followers should only marry other black people, although this includes Native, Latino, and African Americans. Marrying whites is taboo, with the group claiming that sex with white women emasculates black men. This emasculation is a great concern to the NOI, which seeks to restore what it regards as black manhood.

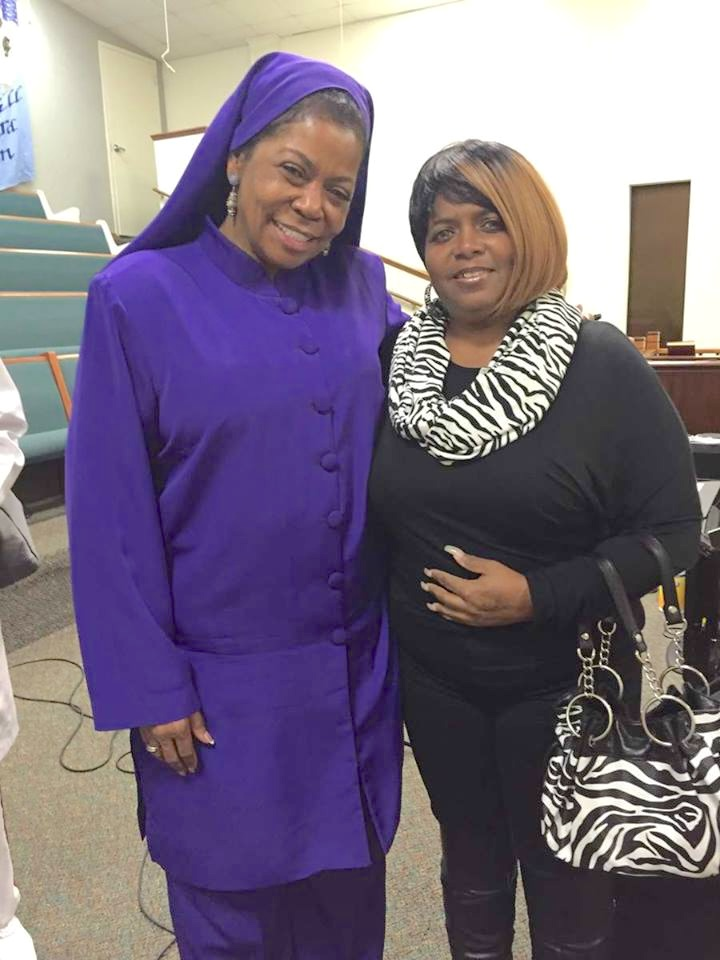
Ava Muhammad (left, photographed in 2014) was the NOI's first female minister.

Men and women are discouraged from forming friendships with each other. Instead, members seeking to court each other are expected to inform the captain of their local Fruit of Islam or Muslim Girls Training branch about their intentions. Men found to have beaten their wives are temporarily suspended from Nation membership. Divorce is discouraged but not forbidden. NOI members are encouraged to have children, with Farrakhan also encouraging adoption. Children are expected to study hard, avoid street culture, and respect their elders.

The Nation criticises birth control methods as the white establishment's attempt to lower the black birthrate, although does not ban their use. Farrakhan expressed support for abortion in cases of rape, incest or where the woman's life is endangered. Same-sex relationships are condemned as immoral. Elijah Muhammad complained that schools, jails, and prisons were "breeding dens of homosexuals," while Farrakhan banned gay men from his Million Man March, bringing accusations of homophobia.
