= Five-Percent Nation =

American black nationalist religious movement

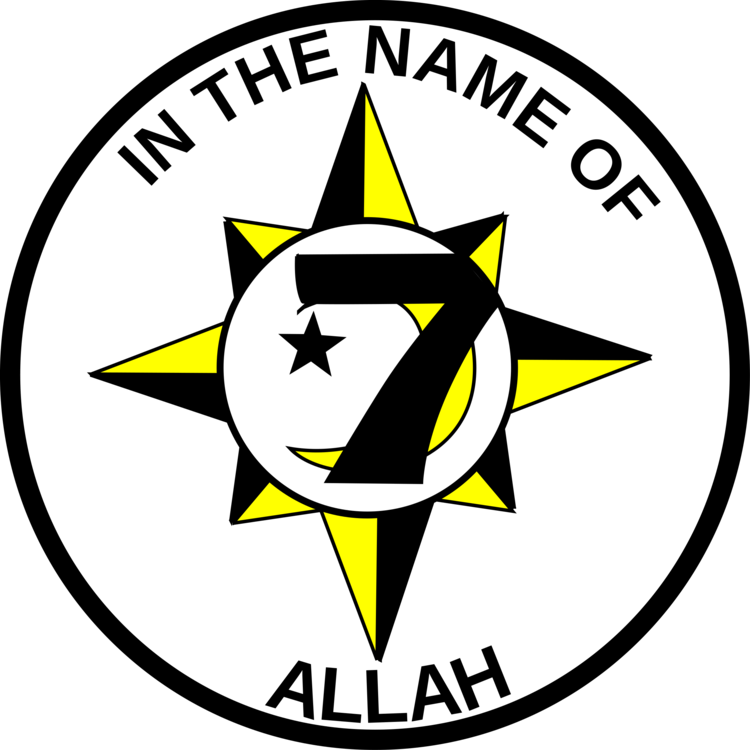
The Five-Percent emblem, also known as the Universal Flag of Islam (I-Self Lord and Master)

Clarence 13X, the founder of the Nation of Gods and Earths

The Five-Percent Nation, sometimes referred to as the Five Percenters or the Nation of Gods and Earths (NGE/NOGE), is a cultural movement influenced by the Nation of Islam founded in 1964 in the Harlem section of the borough of Manhattan, New York City, by Clarence 13X, a former member of the Nation of Islam who was previously known as Clarence Edward Smith.

Members of the group call themselves Allah's Five Percenters, which reflects the concept that ten percent of the people in the world are elites and their agents, who know the truth of existence and opt to keep eighty-five percent of the world in ignorance and under their controlling thumb; the remaining five percent are those who know the truth and are determined to enlighten the eighty-five percent.

The Nation of Gods and Earths teaches the belief that Black people are the original people of the planet Earth and are therefore the fathers ("Gods") and mothers ("Earths") of civilization. The Nation teaches that Supreme Mathematics and Supreme Alphabet, a set of principles created by Allah the Father, is the key to understanding humankind's relationship to the universe. The Nation teaches that the black man, insofar as the Nation defines this race, is himself God, with the black race being a race of actual gods.

== History ==
=== Founding ===
The Nation of Gods and Earths was founded by Clarence 13X after he left the Nation of Islam (NOI)'s Temple No. 7 in Harlem, New York, the same temple where Malcolm X was a minister from 1960 to 1963. Multiple stories exist as to why Clarence and the NOI parted ways. Some state he refused to give up gambling; others state he questioned the unique divinity of Wallace Fard Muhammad, whom the NOI deified as the true and living God in person, or that he questioned Fard's godhood because he believed that Fard was born of a white mother. One story states that he was disciplined by the NOI and excommunicated in 1963, but another version of events says that he left of his own free will.

After leaving the NOI, he renamed himself "Allah the Father." He was joined by Abu Shahid, formerly John 37X, who agreed with Allah's questioning of Wallace Fard Muhammad. Allah the Father and Shahid were nicknamed "High Scientists" due to their intense study of lessons. Clarence was joined by Justice, formerly James 109X, and before that, James Howell, who became one of his closest associates until his death.

Clarence proselytized the streets of Harlem, to teach others his views based on his interpretation of NOI teachings. After failing to reach elder adults whom he saw as already set in their ways, he found success with street youth. On October 10, 1964, this young group formed the First Nine Born of what became known as the Five-Percent Nation, or later the Nation of Gods and Earths.

Clarence taught his Black male students that they were Gods, just as he was. He taught them that the astral twin of the Black man is the Sun. In Supreme Mathematics, the Black man is symbolized as "Knowledge." The Black women who came into Clarence's growing movement to study along with the males were taught they were symbolic of the planet Earth, because women produce and sustain human existence as does the Earth. Female Five Percenters are also referred to as "Wisdom." The Nation of Gods and Earths' Supreme Wisdom states: "Wisdom is the Original Woman because life is continued through her cipher (womb)."

The NGE does not consider itself a religion. Its position is that because adherents themselves, both collectively and individually, are the highest power in the known universe, there is nothing for them to worship outside of themselves.

Clarence developed a curriculum of eight lessons that included the Supreme Alphabets and Mathematics, which he devised, as well as lessons developed by the Nation of Islam's Elijah Muhammad and Wallace Fard Muhammad. The eight lessons were taught in this order, which follows below:

1. Supreme Mathematics (1–10)
2. Supreme Alphabets (1–26)
3. Student Enrollment (1–10)
4. English Lesson C-1 (1–36)
5. Lost-Found Muslim Lesson No. 1 (1–14)
6. Lost-Found Muslim Lesson No. 2 (1–40)
7. Actual Facts (13)
8. Solar Facts (9)

Each Five Percenter was required to fully "master" each lesson and was expected to be able to "think and reason by forming profound relationships between the lessons and significant experiences within life." Five Percenters were required to share what they had learned with others, and thereby recruit new members.

=== Social and political influence ===
The FBI opened a file on the Five Percenters in 1965, the height of the Civil Rights and Black Power Movements in the United States. In "Disturbance by Group Called 'Five Percenters,'" the FBI refers to the organization as a "loosely knit group of Negro youth gangs. [...] These particular gangs emanate from New York City Public School Number 120 which is a junior high school." The FBI file stated that the organization's name meant "The five percent of the Muslims who smoke and drink."

1965 New York newspaper articles referred to the Five Percenters as a "gang", "hoodlums", and "terror group". Allah the Father and the Five Percenters "had a reputation for being unreachable, anti-white criminals." With the goal of preventing New York from having a race riot or uprising, New York Mayor John V. Lindsay sent Barry Gottehrer, the head of the mayor's Urban Task Force, to meet with the organization the FBI had called a "gang" and "terror group". Gottehrer stated Allah the Father was non-violent, "but was dedicated to his community's well-being."

Gottehrer and Clarence began organizing picnics and airplane rides for the Five Percenters that were funded by New York City through the Urban Task Force. Wakeel Allah's book In the Name of Allah includes a photo captioned: "Clarence (in background) along with Mayor Lindsay (holding baby) on airplane ride with Five Percenters." In 1967, Clarence, with Gottehrer's assistance, opened the Urban League Street Academy, which became known as the Allah School in Mecca.

In 1967, shortly after Clarence and Justice started holding classes at the Street Academy, Civil Rights leader Bayard Rustin and Massachusetts Senator Edward Brooke visited Father Allah at the academy. In an article titled "The Five Percenters", published in The New Amsterdam News, Rustin wrote:

We might all applaud the Street Academy as one of the most constructive contributions to the maintenance of stability in the Harlem Community, as well as creating an effective instrument for the rehabilitation of young men who might otherwise have no choice but the streets. [...] Besides their academic and social activities, the Five Percenters told me that they pursue a spiritual ideal of "helping others discover a true knowledge of themselves." They said they are "neither anti-white nor pro-black."

Leaders have described the group as "neither pro-black nor anti-white." Unlike the NOI, membership is not restricted on the basis of race. There have been from the organization's inception Five Percenters of various ethnicities. The most well-known white Five Percenter is John Michael Kennedy, who met Clarence in 1965. Allah proclaimed Kennedy a "righteous man" and renamed him Azreal. Michael M. Knight's The Five Percenters includes a photo of a gathering of Five Percenters that includes Barkim, who Knight describes as "one of the earliest white Five Percenters" and his siblings. Knight's book includes two photos of Allah with Gottehrer, who Allah called "Moses".

In 2018, members of the Five Percent Nation and Harlem community members applied to the Transportation/Historic Preservation & Landmarks Committee of Manhattan Community Board 10, to have the northwest corner of 126th Street & Adam Clayton Powell Jr. Blvd in Harlem, New York, co-named "Allah, Justice & The Five Percenters Square". The application and subsequent proposal were approved by Manhattan Community Board 10 and the New York City Council. In March 2019, the intersection of 126th Street & Adam Clayton Powell Jr. Blvd in New York was officially co-named "Allah, Justice & The Five Percenters Square".

=== Conflicts ===
After the founding of the Allah School, the Gods and Earths became more influential – upon the April 1968 assassination of Martin Luther King Jr., it quelled a potential rebellion inside Harlem. Allah was assassinated on 13 June 1969, in the lobby of 21 West 112th Street in Harlem, within the Martin Luther King Jr. Towers housing projects, the residence of his wife and children. There have been rumors and theories about assailants and motives, but the murder remains unsolved. The murder was a blow to the movement. According to the direct orders of Allah before his death, some of his earliest disciples, a group of nine men who were called the First Nine Born, carried on the teachings, and his friend Justice assumed an acting leadership role.

The FBI's labeling the Five Percenters as a "gang" in 1965 has caused much trouble for Gods and Earths in the United States. The "gang" label has caused individuals with even remote NGE affiliation to be designated as security threats in jails and prisons in Michigan, New Jersey, New York, and South Carolina. NGE literature has been banned from penal institutions in these and other states, and inmates have been denied privileges enjoyed by those of other persuasions. Such rules were relaxed in 2004 in New York to allow registered "sincere adherent(s)" to study teachings personally, but not share with unregistered inmates during their incarceration.

The group's newspaper, The Five Percenter, condemns the states that impose restrictions on their practice as those who "attempt to define us in ways that seek to criminalize us." In 2009, in Michigan, the Nation challenged a ban on the group's literature among prison inmates, after an inmate was designated a security threat until he renounced his membership. Judge Steven Whalen found no evidence that the group advocated violence and recommended that it be recognized as a legitimate belief system.

== Beliefs ==
=== Basis ===
The men of the Five Percent Nation view themselves as Gods, both individually and collectively as the "Original Man." According to the Five Percenter Newspaper, "God first means that it is no longer a judicial argument; centered means everything we do is about God. Culture is the practices and principles of a people at any given time." Gods and Earths sometimes refer to themselves as scientists, implying their search for knowledge and proof.

The teachings of the Nation of Gods and Earths are passed on through a modern oral tradition. The advancement of a God or Earth is based on their memorization, recitation, comprehension, and practical application of the Supreme Mathematics and the Supreme Alphabet and also the 120 Lessons, sometimes referred to as degrees, a revised version of the Supreme Wisdom lessons of the NOI, originally written by Wallace Fard Muhammad and Elijah Muhammad.

The anthology Knowledge of Self: A Collection of Wisdom on the Science of Everything in Life by Supreme Understanding details the teachings of the Nation of Gods and Earths. Wakeel Allah has written In the Name of Allah: A History of Clarence 13X and the 5 Percenters and The Naked Truth: From the Goal Mind of Abu Shahid, the Elder of the Nation of Gods and Earths.

=== "Five Percent" ===
The term "Five Percenter" is taken directly from the "Five Percent" who are described in "Lost-Found Muslim Lesson No. 2" of the Nation of Islam. The lesson groups the people of the world into three categories. Eighty-five percent of the world's population are described as "uncivilized people; poison animal eaters; slaves from mental death and power, people who do not know the Living God or their origin in this world, and they worship that which they do not know. [...] [They] are easily led in the wrong direction, but hard to lead into the right direction."

Ten percent of the world's population are described as "The rich; the slave-makers of the poor; who teach the poor lies—to believe that the Almighty, True and Living God is a spook and cannot be seen by the physical eye. Otherwise known as: The Blood-Suckers of the Poor."

Five Percent of the world's population are described as "the poor, righteous Teachers, who do not believe in the teachings of the 10%, and are all-wise; and know who the Living God is; and Teach that the Living God is the Sun of man, the supreme being, the (Black man) of Asia [Pangea]; and Teach Freedom, Justice, and Equality to all of the human families of the planet Earth."

=== The Universal Language ===
The Supreme Mathematics and Supreme Alphabet are key concepts in the Five Percent Nation. The Supreme mathematics is a system of understanding numerals alongside concepts and qualitative representations that are used along with the Supreme Alphabet. The Supreme Mathematics is thought to be the highest system of numerology in the NGE, used to give qualitative value to numbers in addition to quantity. How the values associated with each number were derived is unknown. The numerals are as follows:

- 1. Knowledge
- 2. Wisdom
- 3. Understanding
- 4. Culture or Freedom
- 5. Power or Refinement
- 6. Equality
- 7. God
- 8. Build or Destroy
- 9. Born (Birth)
- 0. Cipher

The Supreme Alphabet is a system of interpreting text and finding deeper meaning from the NOI Lessons, by assigning actual meanings to the letters of the Latin script. For example, the first letter, A, stands for Allah; the 12th letter, L, stands for Love, Hell, or Right; and the 13th letter, M, stands for Master. The Supreme Alphabet was developed by Allah the Father and Justice. The method by which letters were associated with certain values is unknown.

=== Customs ===
The Five-Percent Nation holds events known as Universal Parliaments in various cities—usually once a month—to build on their interpretation of the Supreme Mathematics, lessons, and to discuss business concerning the NGE. These meetings usually take place in public areas and can be held anywhere.

Because the NGE defines itself as a way of life and not a religion, the Nation generally does not observe religious holidays, including those associated with Christianity or Islam. Many Five Percenters honor Allah the Father's birthday on February 22, or the official founding of the Nation on October 10, with special events and parliaments. The Show and Prove is an annual event that takes place in Harlem every second weekend in June.

Similar to adherents of denominations of traditional Islam, Five Percenters abstain from eating pork or any pork-based by-products. According to Five Percenter Universal Shaamguadd, Allah the Father stated Five Percenters should avoid eating "small scavengers, such as shrimp", and avoid "lobsters, crabs, clams, and oysters". Some Five Percenters take further steps and eschew meat altogether, often opting for strict vegetarianism. Allah the Father advocated "eating one meal a day, every other day or every third days, as prescribed in the Nation of Islam." Allah was a proponent of fasting and many new adherents fast as part of "an induction process".

=== Teachings on race ===
The teachings of Five-Percent Nation have been accused of promoting Black supremacy. As in the Nation of Islam, Five Percenters believe that the original inhabitants of the world were Black, which they refer to as the "Asiatic Blackman" and believe had inhabited the earth for "66 trillion years", who ultimately descended from the Tribe of Shabazz, while the white race are evil "devils" who were created 6,000 years ago on what is today the Greek island of Patmos, by a "rogue bigheaded scientist" named Yakub, the Biblical and Qur'anic Jacob, who was of the Meccan branch of the tribe. After the whites attempted to rise up against their creators, they were exiled to the caves of "West Asia" – what would later be known as Europe. The Yakub origin story is the basis for all Five Percenter racial understanding.

=== Gender perceptions ===
Some Five Percenters have been accused of promoting male chauvinism and misogyny. According to Prince Allah Cuba, since the death of Allah the Father, some Gods have grown preoccupied with male supremacy, resulting in the minimization of all things female: from the crescent moon on the nation's flag being made smaller and eventually placed under the number seven, to the lack of parity in the God-Earth dyad.

According to the Five Percent Nation, each member constitutes a divine being in their own right. Some men promote the minimization of women, as with Lord Jamar's lyric that woman is "secondary but most necessary". Others describe the Black woman as the Black man's equal: In X Clan's song "Wiz Degrees", Five Percenter Brother J describes his partner as "Wisdom and the Goddess manifest". Ladybug Mecca, a Five Percenter and the female member of the hip hop group Digable Planets, offers her view of gender and divinity:

We need to know that there is a feminine and masculine principal or consciousness that is considered the God or the Creator. It's not a male, like religion will tell you. It's a mother/father principle, a masculine/feminine principle. [...] The feminine principle is what gives birth to the universe. It's what brings creation forth, so there has to be an acknowledgement and respect for her in order to bring back the balance. In religion, in Christianity and in Islam, in all religions ... it's a perverted piece of the truth, when it doesn't hold the woman on a pedestal.

Five Percenter Just I C Equality Allah, asserts that gender equality is an inherent aspect of ALLAH: "How can woman not be God as well as man? First of all, we are the Arm Leg Leg Arm Head (Allah). There is no gender type, we all have the components that make the physical. Allah is the all in all. How can we be the all in all if 'all' isn't included?" When Allah the Father was alive, some female Five Percenters referred to themselves as Goddesses. A Five Percent female named Tawanna referred to herself as God. When challenged by some male Five Percenters, Tawanna defended her position and was declared by Justice to be "more God than some of the men!"

== Influence on hip-hop ==
The majority of allusions to Islam in American hip-hop, either conscious or otherwise, spawn from adherents of the Five Percenters. In its article on Five Percenter Jay Electronica, Vice Magazine stated in regard to the Five Percent Nation: "It's a movement that's been affiliated with hip-hop from the very beginning, coining terms like 'ciphers' and 'dropping science' and influencing everyone, World's Famous Supreme Team, Big Daddy Kane, Busta Rhymes, J. Cole, Jay-Z, Rakim, Wu-Tang Clan, Brand Nubian, Nas, Common, Poor Righteous Teachers, Erykah Badu, and AZ. With these artists, and any others associated with the Five Percenters, music was more than just a message."

The Nation of Gods and Earths has propagated its teachings throughout the United States and abroad. In the early 1980s, this spread was in part due to early adherents teaching when away at college or in the military and, more famously, because of the rise of hip hop music. The main theme of the NGE doctrine spoken on hip hop records were the teachings that black people were the original or first human life to walk the planet, that the Black man is God, the Black woman is Earth, and through the inner esoteric powers of the Gods and Earths, the youth can transform and possess their true potential and overthrow the overbearing oligarchy by becoming just rulers of themselves. This especially meshed well with conscious themes found in other golden-age hip hop recordings.

Early hip-hop acts affiliated with the Five Percenters, and who spread its teachings through hip hop, include two MCs from the conscious-rap era of the late 1980s and early 1990s: Rakim of Eric B. & Rakim and Big Daddy Kane. These two acts, as well as some of their other contemporaries, infused Five-Percent teachings and symbolism throughout their music and videos. This reputation brought fans of Rakim in particular to refer to him as the God MC.

After Rakim and Kane's heyday, acts emerged that were more explicitly aligned with the NGE, most notably Brand Nubian, Poor Righteous Teachers, Wu-Tang Clan, Killarmy, Sunz of Man, Gravediggaz and Busta Rhymes. The popularity of these acts sparked a boom of new NGE students. The hip hop group 3rd Bass, whose MCs Prime Minister Pete Nice and MC Serch were white and Jewish, respectively, cited NGE lessons in the song "Triple Stage Darkness" and other songs.

Five Percenters were the innovators behind early hip-hop slang, including "word is bond," "break it down," "peace," "droppin' science," and "represent." Many MCs employ the technique and terminology of the Supreme Alphabet to create acrostics, acronyms and backronyms in their rhymes. For example, in the song "Wildflower", Ghostface Killah rhymes, "I'm God Cipher Divine", spelling G-O-D in the Supreme Alphabet. RZA directly rhymes the Twelve Jewels of life's objectives on his later work with Gravediggaz, rhyming in succession: knowledge, wisdom, understanding, freedom, justice, equality, food, clothing, shelter, love, peace, happiness. He regularly wears an eight-pointed star pendant, with a number seven and a crescent, which can be seen on the cover of his album The World According to RZA.

Five Percenters in New York City were a visible presence at parties during hip hop's formative years of the 1970s. Scene pioneer DJ Kool Herc recalled that while there was a heavy gang presence in attendance, the Five Percenters were there as a de facto peace-keeping element.

Other examples of hip hop and R&B acts who are, or have been, associated with Five Percent teachings include Killah Priest, Digable Planets, J-Live, Nas, Erykah Badu, Queen Latifah, Planet Asia, and Guru.

== Sources ==
- Allah, Wakeel (2007). In the Name of Allah: A History of Clarence 13X and the Five Percenters, Vol. 1. Atlanta, GA: A-Team Publishing. ISBN 978-1-59916-200-3. OCLC 137272467.
