= Tribe of Shabazz =

Supposed ancient Black nation

In the belief system of the Nation of Islam, the Tribe of Shabazz (Arabic: قَبِيلَة ٱلشَّبَازّ, romanized: qabīlah ash-shabāzz) was an ancient black nation that migrated into Central Africa, led by a leader named Shabazz. The concept is found primarily in the writings of Wallace Fard Muhammad and Elijah Muhammad. According to The Autobiography of Malcolm X, all races except for the white race are descendants of the Tribe of Shabazz.

== Story ==
According to the Nation of Islam, the Tribe of Shabazz was the only survivor of thirteen tribes that lived on Earth 66 trillion years ago. After a rogue scientist blew up the planet, splitting off the moon, the other tribes perished. The Tribe of Shabazz relocated to the rich Nile valley of Egypt and then to the present seat of the Islamic holy city of Mecca in Arabia.

It was a technologically advanced society, but one faction was led by Shabazz himself into previously unoccupied areas of Central Africa because he wanted them to be hardened. There they evolved Negroid features. Malcolm X stated in a speech in 1962:

He wanted the people to undergo a form of life that would make them tough and hard, and the other scientists wouldn't agree with him. So this scientist named Shabazz took his family and wandered down into the jungles of Africa. Prior to that time no one lived in the jungles. Our people were soft; they were black but they were soft and delicate, fine. They had straight hair. Right here on this Earth you find some of them look like that today. They are black as night, but their hair is like silk, and originally all our people had that kind of hair. But this scientist took his family down into the jungles of Africa, and living in the open, living a jungle life, eating all kinds of food had an effect on the appearance of our people. Actually living in the rough climate, our hair became stiff, like it is now.

A scientist named Yakub was a member of the Meccan branch of the tribe and, according to Fard, was the creator of the white race. The Tribe of Shabazz is said to have reached its peak in the year 4084 BC.

== Name ==
The name may be related to the Arabic words sha'b (شَعْب) 'a people', and azz (عَزّ) 'to be mighty or glorious'.

However, the name's etymology is possibly also related to Indo-European as there is a similar Persian name, Shahbāz (شهباز) meaning 'royal falcon' or 'eagle' (a contraction of shāh "king" and bāz "hawk, falcon"), popular among Bosnian, Turkish, Indian, and Pakistani Muslims. Shāh is from Old Persian xšāyaθiya "king", itself derived from Proto-Indo-Iranian *ksayati "he controls", ultimately from Proto-Indo-European *tkeh_{1}- "to rule, to control land" (cf. Greek κταομαι ktaómai "to procure, to annex", Sanskrit क्षत्र kṣatra "dominion"). Bāz in turn derives from Middle Persian vāǰ.

Malcolm X used the surname Shabazz from 1949 because he believed himself to be a descendant of the tribe. Members of his family have also used the name, which has also been adopted by other persons.

Karl Evanzz, author of the books The Judas Factor: The Plot to Kill Malcolm X (1992) and The Messenger: The Rise and Fall of Elijah Muhammad (1999), lays out a variety of theories that connects the name to locations and names in several of W. D. Fard's alleged places of birth. Going for Afghanistan: Shabazz, along with Fard, is a common name in this region according to Evanzz. His World War I draft card lists him as being born in the district of Shinkay in Zabul Province. In addition, Qalat is one of the names for the capital of Zabul Province, which Evanzz connects to Elijah Muhammad's brother being given the name "Kallat Muhammad" by Shahbaz and Fard when he became a minister in the NOI. Evanzz also lays out the name's possible South Asian origins; the Qalandar temple named after the Sufi saint Lal Shahbaz Qalandar is located near one of Fard's claimed places of birth. Shahbazz is a common name in Pakistan.

In The Messenger, Evanzz had originally speculated that Fard was the son of Zared Fard, a Māori whose family had lived in Pakistan. Evanzz further alleges that Fard's mother was a Caucasian New Zealander named Beatrice Dodd.
