= Killing of Henry Marrow =

1970 lynching in Oxford, North Carolina, US

Henry Dortress "Dickie" Marrow Jr. (January 7, 1947 – May 12, 1970) was an African-American veteran of the Army and known for being shot and killed by white people in a racial confrontation in Oxford, North Carolina, at the age of 23. His murder and the acquittal of two suspects by an all-white jury were catalysts for a renewal of civil rights actions in the county seat. Public facilities and businesses had remained segregated six years after passage of national civil rights legislation.

Protests took place after the killing and arson was committed against some white-owned buildings. The black community organized to conduct what became an 18-month boycott of white businesses, which ended after the town agreed to end segregation of public facilities. The events in Oxford also influenced the broader Civil Rights Movement throughout the state and United States.

== Background ==
Henry "Dickie" Marrow was born to Henry D. Marrow, Sr. and Ivey Hunt Marrow on January 7, 1947, in Oxford, North Carolina. His parents separated early on. After Henry, Sr. died in a violent quarrel, Ivey Marrow could not provide for her son alone. She went North for work in New Jersey. While she was gone, Marrow lived with his maternal grandparents in Oxford during his childhood. During his adolescence, he moved in with the family of Benjamin Chavis while he attended Mary Potter High School. After his graduation, Marrow attended Kittrell College for about a year.

At the age of 19, Henry Marrow, Jr. joined the military and was stationed in Fort Bragg in the same state. Marrow did not like Army life and was reluctant to fight in Vietnam, where the United States had an increasing number of troops. He often returned to Oxford, making the three-hour trip sometimes to see Willie Mae Sidney, whom he would later marry. A 1978 article in The New York Times characterized Marrow as a Vietnam War veteran but, according to Timothy Tyson's 2004 history, Marrow never served there. After completing his service, Marrow moved back to Oxford.

He started working at Umstead Hospital in Butner. He and Willie May Sidney had two daughters together. She was pregnant with a third child when he was killed in 1970.

Despite passage of federal civil rights legislation, Oxford in 1970 was still largely a segregated community. In the spring of 1970, white store owner, Robert Teel, was being boycotted by the local black community because he had beaten a black schoolteacher who had gotten into an argument with his wife. Teel was reported as having a criminal record and connections to the Ku Klux Klan.

== Killing ==
On the evening of May 11, 1970, Henry Marrow and a number of friends were playing whist at the Tidewater Seafood Market, a popular location for young men in town. Just before 9 pm, Marrow left the Tidewater, telling friends that he planned to visit Teel's nearby shop in order to buy Fanny Chavis a Coca-Cola. Teel's 18-year-old son Larry, and Larry's wife Judy, were unpacking motorcycles in the parking lot. Marrow was said to make a remark, the content of which is disputed and unknown. Judy Teel later testified that Marrow had spoken "ugly" words to her.

Larry Teel shouted, "That's my wife you're talking to." Then, Robert Teel and his stepson Roger Oakley, who had been working nearby, ran into the shop. According to onlookers, they retrieved their guns. Later describing Marrow's killing, Robert Teel said in a recorded account, "That nigger committed suicide, coming in here wanting to four-letter-word my daughter-in-law."

Marrow told Larry Teel that he was speaking to two African-American women standing nearby, an explanation that Teel did not accept. When Teel tried to hit Marrow with a wooden block, Marrow drew a knife and slowly backed away. Edward Webb, a witness at the Tidewater, said that he and other young men tried to convince Marrow to leave before they ran themselves. Boo Chavis, a friend of Marrow, later said that Marrow "didn't believe in running" and added "that's probably why he's dead." Marrow finally fled after Oakley and Robert Teel emerged from the Teel shop carrying two shotguns and a rifle.

According to Tyson, Robert Teel fired his shotgun at Marrow, which struck him and wounded Chavis, who had just happened onto the scene. Teel fired a second time, knocking Marrow to the ground; Oakley shot him twice with a shotgun. At this point, Marrow was still conscious, bleeding on the ground. Roger Oakley, Robert and Larry Teel approached him, and began to beat him, and Robert Teel repeatedly exclaimed, "Kill him." According to witness Evelyn Downey, the three men stood around Marrow kicking him, and Robert Teel shouted, "Shoot the son of a bitch, shoot the son of bitching nigger." According to Tyson, either Robert or Larry fired a single bullet from the .22 rifle into Marrow's head.

At trial, Oakley testified that he had held the gun that fired the killing shot and that it had discharged accidentally when his stepfather had jarred his shoulder. Chavis testified that Larry Teel shot Marrow. The Teels locked up their shop and left for home, and Boo Chavis, his brother Jimmy, and Webb collected Marrow, who was still living, and took him to Granville County Hospital.

After doctors were unable to stabilize him, Marrow was taken from Granville to Duke University Medical Center and died on the way there.

== Aftermath ==
The Marrow killing was a catalyst to demonstrations related to the Civil Rights Movement in Granville County, six years after the passage of major federal legislation to end segregation and five years after a law to enforce voting rights. On the day of Marrow's funeral, mourners marched from the gravesite to the Confederate monument at the county courthouse in Downtown Oxford, where leaders spoke about the killing. A similar march was held the next day.

Arson was committed against white businesses. The burning of several warehouses and shops was estimated to have caused $1 million in damages. Rumors flew that Vietnam veterans had been responsible for the arson. Because of the civil unrest related to the murder, the city established a four-day curfew. Meanwhile, a group held a protest march to the state capital.

Robert Teel, and his two sons, Larry Teel and Roger Oakley, were indicted on charges of murder. At the trial, an all-white jury was picked and returned a verdict of not guilty on all counts for the charges against the Teels and Oakley. Later that year, Marrow's widow filed a wrongful death civil suit against the Teels.

After the murder trial, Benjamin Chavis, a young local civil rights organizer and leader of the local chapter of the NAACP, led a protest march from Oxford to the state capital. Then, he and other black people conducted a "boycott of white businesses that lasted 18 months" and finally achieved full integration in Oxford. In 1972 the Herald-Journal reported that a witness said that Chavis had allegedly offered to pay $5,000 for the death of one of the Teels.

Henry Marrow's grave is marked with a military headstone showing his name, rank and state, date of birth and death, and the word "Vietnam." Sources disagree as to whether he had served there.

== Book and film ==
Timothy Tyson, a childhood friend of Teel's younger son who was living in Oxford during those years, earned a doctorate and became an historian. He published Blood Done Sign My Name (2004) about the killing of Marrow, the trial, and their effects on Oxford, North Carolina and the civil rights movement. It recounted the events of Marrow's killing and related them to broader social issues of the time and the racial history of the area.

The book was adapted as a 2010 film of the same name, written and directed by Jeb Stuart. Filmed in several cities in North Carolina, it starred Ricky Schroder, Nate Parker, and Nick Searcy.

It was also adapted as a play of the same name, which premiered at Duke University in 2008.

== Bibliography ==
- Tyson, Timothy. Blood Done Sign My Name. New York: Crown Publishers, 2004.
