= Wuthering Heights (score) =

Wuthering Heights (Original Motion Picture Score)

Film score by Anthony Willis
- Released: February 27, 2026
- Recorded: 2025–2026
- Studio: AIR Studios, London
- Genre: Film score
- Length: 64:34
- Label: Milan
- Producer: Finn Keane

Anthony Willis chronology
Violent Ends (2025)	Wuthering Heights (2026)	Newborn (2026)

Wuthering Heights (Original Motion Picture Score) is the film score to the 2026 film Wuthering Heights directed by Emerald Fennell loosely based on the 1847 novel by Emily Brontë. The score is composed by Anthony Willis and released through Milan Records on February 27, 2026, two weeks after the film's theatrical release.

== Development ==
Anthony Willis composed the film score renewing his association with Fennell after Promising Young Woman (2020) and Saltburn (2023). Willis added that Emerald wanted to capture the sense of innocence in children through the story, while the way he had scored associated with a Gothic tone albeit Fennell looked something more restrained and yearning. Willis crafted a simplistic score which in turn "getting under people's skin" like an English folk hymn representing Catherine Earnshaw and Heathcliff's bond since childhood being prevalent throughout the film.

Willis added that even though he had reduced the chords of the cues, the score still retained its personality calling it an "honest" score. Though Willis tried to reduce a cue, he felt that the more minimal the music becomes, the more difficult to envelop the narrative and a little body of the score can lead out introducing a new narrative that can stick out from the film. Hence, the music becomes a counterintuitive where the noticeability of the score increases when the music becomes too reductive. The use of orchestra added more colors to provide a seamless transition to the score.

== Reception ==
Justin Chang of The New Yorker called it "a lush orchestral cushion of a score, by Anthony Willis". Tim Grierson of Screen International wrote "Anthony Willis’ demonstrative string-laden score amplif[ies] the plot's cruel betrayals and the characters’ feverish hormones." David Rooney of The Hollywood Reporter wrote "Anthony Willis' score [...] effectively pumps up the romance and the tragedy." Peter Debruge of Variety wrote that the film "finds its musical equivalent in Anthony Willis' score". Katherine McLaughlin of The List called it a "lingering score". Nick Schager of The Daily Beast with Willis' score, "the film doesn’t leave a moment wanting for overbearing sonic accompaniment".

Amy Nicholson of Los Angeles Times noted that the music provides equal tension with Willis' score "entwining raspy strings with grimy, ominous shudders." Therese Lacson of Collider wrote "Anthony Willis' sweeping score accents the wild moors perfectly". Rafer Guzmán of Newsday called it a "mournful score". Mick LaSalle of San Francisco Chronicle wrote "Both actors have to compete with Anthony Willis’ overwrought soundtrack, which keeps insisting we’re feeling emotions that we aren't." John Lui of The Straits Times wrote "The synth-heavy score of English composer Anthony Willis [...] underline Fennell’s modern take on obsessive love."

== Track listing ==
No.	Title	Length
1.	"C & H"	2:24
2.	"The Kindest Man Alive"	1:08
3.	"Again & Again"	2:46
4.	"A Very Important Family"	1:05
5.	"Thrushcross Mirage"	1:31
6.	"Kitten in Clover"	1:42
7.	"I cannot play with you!"	4:08
8.	"Isabella's Dollhouse"	1:47
9.	"Watch me grope for them!"	1:49
10.	"Dog in a Manger"	2:01
11.	"Shall I come fetch you?"	4:02
12.	"You're not enough for her!"	2:45
13.	"So kiss me and be damned"	3:24
14.	"Nelly's New Position"	2:17
15.	"Wounded Swallow"	2:28
16.	"This is how he loves you?"	4:18
17.	"Mrs. Heathcliff"	1:20
18.	"It Is My Name"	2:15
19.	"I Will Wait for You"	3:07
20.	"I've never believed you!"	4:55
21.	"Be with Me Always"	5:53
22.	"Wuthering Heights Suite"	4:29
23.	"Thrushcross Grange Suite"	3:00
Total length:		64:34

== Personnel credits ==
Credits adapted from Film Music Reporter:

- Music composer: Anthony Willis
- Music production and arrangement: Finn Keane
- Additional music production: Isabella Summers
- Additional score production: Erik Groysman, Peter Gregson
- Music editor: Peter Clarke
- Additional music editor: Janet Grab
- Music supervisor: Nicolette Di Dia
- Music clearance: Jill Meyers, Drew Bayers
- Performer: London Contemporary Orchestra
- Conductor: Hugh Tieppo-Brunt
- Additional conductor: Andrew Skeet
- Lead orchestrator: Brett Bailey
- Additional orchestrators: Hugh Tieppo-Brunt, Ananda Chatterjee, Talia Morey, Stephen Coleman
- Copyist: Giles Thornton
- Orchestra manager: Amy-Elisabeth Hinds
- Deputy orchestra manager: Anastasia Kudryashova
- Recording projects manager: Amy Dodero
- Orchestra leader: Eloisa-Fleur Thom, Mandhira de Saram
- Recording and mixing: Nick Wollage (AIR Studios)
- Score recordist, score editor and mixing assistant: Ashley Andrew-Jones
- Score technical assistants: Hunouk Park, Ishaan Tyagi
- Assistant engineers: Rebecca Hordern, Ronan Murphy
- Head of studios: Charlotte Matthews
- Studio contractor: Katy Jackson

Instruments

- Violin: Eloisa-Fleur Thom, Mandhira de Saram, Úna Palliser
- Viola: Zoë Matthews, Clifton Harrison
- Cello: Brian O’Kane, Ian Burdge, Max Ruisi
- Double bass: Dave Brown
- Piano: Gavin Greenaway
- Dulcimer: Elsa Bradley
- Guitar, banjo and ukulele: Justin Quinn
- Flute: Pasha Mansurov, Chloe Vincent, Abigail Burrows, Jack Reddick
- Alto flute: Abigail Burrows, Jack Reddick
- Harp: Vicky Lester, Valeria Kurbatova, Anneke Hodnett
- Percussion: Craig Apps
- Vocal: Sumudu Jayatilaka

== Charts ==
Chart performance for Wuthering Heights (Original Motion Picture Score)
Chart (2026)	Peak position
UK Classical Albums (OCC)	6
