= Rise of the Teenage Mutant Ninja Turtles =

American animated television series

- Genre: Science fantasy; Superhero
- Based on: Characters created by Kevin Eastman and Peter Laird
- Developed by: Ant Ward; Andy Suriano
- Showrunners: Ant Ward; Andy Suriano
- Voices of: Omar Benson Miller; Ben Schwartz; Brandon Mychal Smith; Josh Brener; Kat Graham; Eric Bauza
- Theme music composer: Matt Mahaffey; Leticia Wolf
- Opening theme: "Rise of the Teenage Mutant Ninja Turtles"
- Ending theme: "Rise of the Teenage Mutant Ninja Turtles" (instrumental)
- Composer: Matt Mahaffey
- Country of origin: United States
- Original language: English
- No. of seasons: 2
- No. of episodes: 39 (70 segments)

Production
- Executive producers: Ant Ward; Andy Suriano
- Producer: Vladimir Radev
- Running time: 22 minutes (2 11–minute segments)
- Production company: Nickelodeon Animation Studio

Original release
- Network: Nickelodeon
- Release: July 20, 2018 – July 6, 2019
- Network: Nicktoons
- Release: October 12, 2019 – August 7, 2020

Related
- Teenage Mutant Ninja Turtles (2012)

Rise of the Teenage Mutant Ninja Turtles is an American animated television series developed by Ant Ward and Andy Suriano for Nickelodeon. Based on the Teenage Mutant Ninja Turtles created by Kevin Eastman and Peter Laird, it is a re-imagined series that has the Turtles go on new adventures as they seek to unlock the mystical secrets of New York City and their own powers to save the world from evil.

The series stars the voices of Omar Benson Miller, Ben Schwartz, Brandon Mychal Smith, Josh Brener, Kat Graham, and Eric Bauza. It was announced by Nickelodeon in March 2017, and was initially scheduled to run for at least 26 episodes. Ward and Suriano were attached as showrunners and executive producers. The series was produced by Nickelodeon Animation Studio, and Flying Bark Productions provided the animation.

Rise of the Teenage Mutant Ninja Turtles premiered on Nickelodeon on July 20, 2018. On July 27, 2018, the series was renewed for a second season consisting of 26 episodes. Partway into the production of the second season, however, it was shortened in length to 13 episodes, which were exhibited on Nicktoons. The final episode aired on August 7, 2020. A feature film sequel was released on Netflix on August 5, 2022, following the series finale.

== Plot ==
For this series, the characters were designed to look more distinct from each other.

Deep in the sewers of New York City, four mutant turtle brothers lurk. Raphael, Leonardo, Donatello and Michelangelo (calling themselves the Mad Dogs) are in their early teen years and the brothers go on new adventures. They tap into their mystic ninja powers to learn to work together as a cohesive unit and become a team of heroes as they navigate the modern world and other hidden realms. The brothers get a whole new look, new weapons, and new powers as they discover the hidden city beneath New York and find time for a slice of their favorite pizza.

In the first season, the turtle brothers, along with their friend, April O'Neil, meet an evil alchemist named Baron Draxum, and the dangerous Foot Clan. They also learn of their Master Splinter's secret: that he was once martial arts expert, and movie star, Lou Jitsu. They must collect pieces of an ancient dark armor called the Kuroi Yōroi to prevent the Foot and Draxum from resurrecting the Shredder, a demon once banished by Splinter's ancestors.

In the second season, the brothers face new and old enemies, most notably the evil Shredder, and must stop him from destroying the world. In the process, they must also help Baron Draxum discover his own better nature.

== Production ==
On March 2, 2017, Rise of the Teenage Mutant Ninja Turtles was announced as a new re-imagining of the Teenage Mutant Ninja Turtles franchise. The series was originally intended to have 26 episodes and launch in Fall 2018. Andy Suriano and Ant Ward were attached as showrunners and executive producers. Cyma Zarghami, president of the Nickelodeon Group, stated in a press release:

"The Turtles is a property that has reinvention in its DNA, which keeps it fresh and relevant to every new generation while satisfying the demand from its adult fans. 'Turtles' has been an incredibly important franchise for us since we reignited it five years ago, and we're excited for the new series to take the characters in a different direction with more humor, a younger and lighter feel, and all-new dimensions to explore".

The series logotype was revealed to the public in mid-October 2017. That November, Nickelodeon announced the official voice actor cast for the main characters on the turtles' side. In addition to this news, voice actor Rob Paulsen, who previously voiced Raphael in the 1987 series and Donatello in the 2012 series, served as the voice director for the series. John Cena was later cast as the villain Baron Draxum. Besides voice directing, Rob Paulsen provided voice work alongside fellow voice actor Maurice LaMarche. The animation services for Rise of the Teenage Mutant Ninja Turtles are provided by Australian animation studio Flying Bark Productions.

The major main-characters art designs were announced and revealed by Nickelodeon in February 2018. This occurred during a Facebook event, which was broadcast live that day. On March 23, 2018, the first trailer for the series was released by Nickelodeon. Each episode consists of two 11-minute carts and each of them tell self-contained, standalone stories with hints of a larger plot. The show aired as a sneak peek after the 2018 Kids' Choice Sports in July and later premiered on Nickelodeon on September 17, 2018. On July 27, 2018, Nickelodeon renewed the series for a 26-episode second season. However, the season order was later reduced to 13 episodes.

== Episodes ==
=== Series overview ===
Season	Segments	Episodes	Originally released		
Season	Segments	Episodes	First released	Last released	Network
1	36	20	July 20, 2018	July 6, 2019	Nickelodeon
2	34	19	October 12, 2019	August 7, 2020	Nicktoons

=== Season 1 (2018–19) ===
No. overall	No. in season	Title	Directed by	Written by	Storyboarded by	Original release date	Prod. code	U.S. viewers (millions)
1	1	"Mystic Mayhem"	Brendan Clogher & Sebastian Montes	Ian Busch, Russ Carney, Ron Corcillo and Jesse Gordon	Julia Braid & Kevin Molina-Ortiz	July 20, 2018	101	0.60
The Turtles discover that they are not the only weirdest things in New York when they encounter two villains from the Hidden City pursuing a dog-like agent. They have their first encounter with Baron Draxum, who is making mutants with the help of his Oozesquitos.
2	2	"Donnie's Gifts"	Sebastian Montes	Russ Carney & Ron Corcillo	Jessica Zammit	September 17, 2018	102B	0.65
Donnie creates new gear for his brothers for them to overcome their bad habits. However, the gear only becomes a nuisance as they fight a mutated chef dubbed Meat Sweats, who plans to cook the turtles to gain their powers.
3	3	"War and Pizza"	Brendan Clogher	Ian Busch	Julia Braid	September 17, 2018	103A	0.65
To save April's job as a party captain at Albearto's Pizzeria, Donnie upgrades the main animatronic of Albearto only for it to go out of control.
4	4	"Down With the Sickness"	Jamie Vickers	Jesse Gordon	Christina "Kiki" Manrique	September 18, 2018	104B	0.97
Splinter has come down with the rat flu, and the Turtles must deal with its 7 different stages involving fever, "Wild Rat Man", "Captain Cuddle Cakes", "Ninja Supreme", karaoke love songs, and fan fiction. The Turtles hope that Splinter will make it to the final stage called "Must Say Yes" so that they can ask him for whatever they want.
5	5	"Shell in a Cell"	Sebastian Montes	Dale Malinowski	Kevin Molina-Ortiz	September 19, 2018	106A	0.83
Leo unseats Raph's wrestling idol Ghostbear from his title as the champion of the world after accidentally falling on him from the rafters. Raph soon becomes irked by Leo's cockiness and decides to wrestle him himself. When Ghostbear joins the fight, Raph learns that Ghostbear doesn't play by the rules.
6	6	"Repo Mantis"	Jamie Vickers	Russ Carney & Ron Corcillo	Christopher Luc	September 20, 2018	104A	1.02
Mikey and Donnie try to get a Jupiter Jim moon buggy vehicle from a repo yard, where they run afoul of its owner Repo Mantis. In exchange for the prop vehicle, Mikey and Donnie are hired as repo men and are sent to repossess an RV on Long Island. However, the deal deteriorates when they meet the RV's possessor, a kind mutant named Todd Capybara and his puppies.
7	7	"The Fast and the Furriest"	Brendan Clogher	Russ Carney & Ron Corcillo	Christine Liu	September 24, 2018	105A	0.90
When Donnie's newly built Turtle Tank goes missing, he and the Turtles must find it. While going after some usual suspects, they are unaware that the Turtle Tank was taken by Splinter, who is additionally invited to "dinner" with Meat Sweats.
8	8	"Origami Tsunami"	Jamie Vickers	Russ Carney & Ron Corcillo	Christopher Luc	September 25, 2018	102A	1.19
Longing for the excitements of his life, Leo talks the team into tracking down the paper thief duo currently stalking the city. In doing so, the Turtles run into the Foot Clan, who use their mystic ability to create origami warriors from the stolen paper.
9	9	"Mascot Melee"	Sebastian Montes	Ian Busch	JJ Conway	September 26, 2018	105B	0.92
While looking for a new robe for Splinter, the Turtles traverse through Times Square, where they fight the mascots lurking there who get jealous of Raph's "Turtlepotamus" meme. When they take the money that Raphael has made, the other Turtles suit up and take action against the mascot - until they discover the true identity of the mascots as mutant cockroaches.
10	10	"Newsworthy"	Sebastian Montes	Jesse Gordon	Kevin Molina-Ortiz	September 27, 2018	103B	0.98
To prove himself as the greatest enemy of the Turtles, former news anchor-turned-mutant earthworm Warren Stone gets in the way of the Turtles as they track down Hypno-Potamus who is abducting the animal partners of other magicians.
11	11	"Minotaur Maze"	Brendan Clogher	Jesse Gordon	Christine Liu	October 6, 2018	106B	1.02
After the Turtles stumble across a pizza restaurant called Run of the Mill Pizza in the mystical Undercity while following a Fire Yōkai, Leo drags his brothers into a pizza-shaped Maze of Death to obtain the ultimate prize... a free helping to the titular parlor's "world's greatest pizza". But to claim it, they will have to contend with the maze's "no mystic powers" rule and the pizza's guardian in the form of the Minotaur who is the maze's assistant manager.
12	12	"The Longest Fight"	Sebastian Montes	Ian Busch	Brandon McKinney & Shawna Mills	October 6, 2018	108A	1.02
The Turtles have a hard time watching their skateboarding idol Sydney Allen on the "Extreme Skateboarding Finals" and stopping a burglary at Gilbert's Department Store conducted by the Foot Clan at the same time.
13	13	"The Gumbus"	Sebastian Montes	Russ Carney & Ron Corcillo	Kevin Molina-Ortiz	October 13, 2018	109A	1.09
Leo, Mikey, and April investigate a mysterious specter haunting a themed supermarket called Stock 'n Shop, which leads to their encounter with Baxter Stockboy.
14	14	"Mrs. Cuddles"	Abe Audish & Jamie Vickers	Ian Busch	Christina "Kiki" Manrique	October 20, 2018	109B	0.94
April and the brothers make Raph face his greatest fear: an adorable kids' TV show rabbit named Mrs. Cuddles. However, things aren't so funny anymore when Mrs. Cuddles suddenly comes to life and begins hunting the Turtle family to feed on their fears.
15	15	"Hypno! Part Deux"	Jamie Vickers	Jesse Gordon	Christina "Kiki" Manrique	November 3, 2018	108B	0.99
Hypno-Potamus returns and causes havoc at April's homecoming dance by hypnotizing the attendees.
16	16	"Stuck on You"	Brendan Clogher	Jesse Gordon	Julia Braid	November 10, 2018	110A	1.20
After an unfortunate glue accident, the Turtles have to fight a whole host of villains like the Mutant Silverfish, the Foot Clan, Hypno-Potamus, and Warren Stone while literally being stuck together.
17	17	"Bug Busters"	Abe Audish, Brendan Clogher and Jamie Vickers	Ian Busch, Russ Carney, Ron Corcillo and Jesse Gordon	Julia Braid & Christopher Luc	November 17, 2018	107	0.95
The Turtles look for a way to eliminate New York City's Oozesquito problem before more mutants are made. This plot brings them into conflict with Big Mama in her plot to make mutants fight for her entertainment in the Battle Nexus, which is soon joined by Baron Draxum.
18	18	"Al Be Back"	Brendan Clogher	F.M. De Marco	Christine Liu	December 1, 2018	110B	0.95
The Turtles plan their first public musical gig at Albearto Land. When it happens, it gets crashed by Albearto and his army of animatronic bears from failed Albearto's fast-food franchises.
19	19	"The Evil League of Mutants"	Sebastian Montes	Jesse Gordon	Julia Braid, Kai Jiang and Kevin Molina-Ortiz	January 19, 2019	113	0.77
The Turtles end up facing a new and dangerous threat in their beloved city as Baron Draxum, Huginn, and Muninn gather some of their toughest mutant enemies like Meat Sweats, Hypno-Potamus, Warren Stone, Repo Mantis, and the Sando Brothers in a plot to destroy them.
20	20	"The Purple Jacket"	Abe Audish	Russ Carney & Ron Corcillo	Chris Luc	January 26, 2019	111A	0.99
During a visit to April's school, Donnie becomes enamored with an exclusive tech club, the Purple Dragons, and joins them on the spot. However, when the Dragons abuse his tech for criminal purposes, Don is forced to choose between stopping the crooks and losing his treasured purple membership jacket.
21	21	"Pizza Pit"	Sebastian Montes	Brian Posehn	Gladyfaith Abcede & Kai Jiang	February 2, 2019	111B	0.55
DIGG, a trio of unsuccessful girl musicians mutated into burrowing animals by the Oozesquitos, begin sinking the Turtles' favorite pizza places into the ground during Pizza Week, prompting the Turtles to go after them before they have no place left to get their favorite food.
22	22	"Smart Lair"	Brendan Clogher	Ian Busch	Christine Liu	February 9, 2019	112A	0.99
To ease their household chores, Donnie invents a new artificial intelligence, S.H.E.L.L.D.O.N., who begins to see exclusively to his creator's needs. Disgruntled, Raph, Mikey, and Leo choose to rewire the robot, which leads to near-fatal consequences for their brother.
23	23	"Hot Soup: The Game"	Abe Audish	Russ Carney & Ron Corcillo	Alicia Chan & Christina "Kiki" Manrique	February 16, 2019	112B	0.84
Mikey goes on a solo mission to retrieve a classic video game based on Lou Jitsu's film Hot Soup. Incidentally, however, he will have to contend with the Foot Clan's recruit who is on a very similar mission at the very same auction house.
24	24	"Late Fee"	Abe Audish	Dale Malinowski	Chris Luc	February 23, 2019	114A	0.79
The simple task of returning a single DVD just before its loan period runs out is complicated by endless craziness in New York, including an encounter with Ghostbear.
25	25	"Bullhop"	Sebastian Montes	Russ Carney & Ron Corcillo	Gladyfaith Abcede & Max Collins	March 2, 2019	114B	0.86
Things go sour when the Turtles try to help a down-and-out mutant in the form of the bellhop-turned-mutant bull from "Bug Busters" while at the same time planning a raid on the Grand Nexus Hotel to obtain more of Big Mama's web goo. Bullhop eagerly decides to help his benefactors out.
26	26	"Mind Meld"	Abe Audish	Jesse Gordon	Chris Luc	March 9, 2019	115A	0.68
Frustrated by his brothers' childishness during an important mission, Donnie enhances their intelligence. However, things get quickly out of hand when they begin displaying Donatello's personality traits as well.
27	27	"Nothing But Truffle"	Alan Wan	Russ Carney & Ron Corcillo	Christine Liu	March 16, 2019	115B	0.81
When Mikey and Todd spy on Meat Sweats to learn his most delicious recipe, the Turtle and the mutant chef become BFFs after Meat Sweats accidentally absorbs Todd's niceness. The two of them go on a look for the extremely rare lunar truffle that only grows when the Moon is in alignment with Jupiter and faces its Were-Tree guardian.
28	28	"Portal Jacked!"	Sebastian Montes	Russ Carney & Ron Corcillo	Max Collins & Zane Yarbrough	April 6, 2019	117A	0.65
Leo loses his brothers in a portal and must venture to the mystic Hidden City to save them while dragging Señor Hueso along for the ride. He suspects that they are on the pirate ship run by Señor Hueso's brother Capitán Piel.
29	29	"Sparring Partner"	Abe Audish	Ian Busch	Alicia Chan	April 13, 2019	118B	0.71
Raph becomes friends with a new sparring partner in the form of Frankenfoot and must keep it secret from his brothers, who don't like the guy. When Frankenfoot is driven from the lair, this gives the Foot Lieutenant and Recruit the opportunity to take it into the Foot Clan.
30	30	"Shadow of Evil"	JJ Conway & Alan Wan	Ian Busch	Julia Braid, JJ Conway and Kevin Molina-Ortiz	April 20, 2019	116	0.61
As the Turtles try to find pieces of a strange metal Baron Draxum is looking for, Splinter intends to get to the bottom of these odd activities at April's new job at the Foot Shack. He soon learns that the Foot plan to resurrect their ancient master the Shredder by reassembling the Kuroi Yoroi armor. As the parties clash, the secrets of Splinter's past finally come to light.
31	31	"Warren & Hypno, Sitting in a Tree"	JJ Conway	Jesse Gordon	Christine Liu	June 1, 2019	117B	0.68
Baron Draxum, Huginn, and Muninn want the gauntlet that Warren Stone has since its part of the Kuroi Yōroi armor, but he's not giving it up without a fight and a side of betrayal. As the Turtles get involved with Warren's roommate Hypno-Potamus being threatened, April remembers who Warren Stone is as she was part of a fan club dedicated to him called the Stoneheads.
32	32	"Operation: Normal"	Alan Wan	Laura Sreebny	Julia Braid	June 8, 2019	118A	0.74
Leo and Donnie try desperately to help April enjoy a quiet day with a new friend named Sunita. They learn that she is a slime Yōkai who uses a special amulet to turn into a human. They soon get targeted by the Foot Clan since the boots that Sunita's human form is wearing are part of the Kuroi Yōroi.
33	33	"You Got Served"	Sebastian Montes	Ian Busch	Max Collins & Polyna Kim	June 15, 2019	119A	0.54
Señor Hueso has just remembered that an ogre gang called the Makers of Brutality and a reptilian gang called the Masters of Barbarianism to have book reservations at Run of the Mill Pizza. While helping Señor Hueso at Run of the Mill Pizza since his employees have fled, Leo and Mikey get sidetracked by brotherly competition. They must overcome this to keep the peace while trying not to wreck Run of the Mill Pizza.
34	34	"How to Make Enemies and Bend People to Your Will"	Abe Audish	Russ Carney & Ron Corcillo	Christopher Luc	June 22, 2019	119B	0.49
Baron Draxum struggles to move up the ladder in the Foot Clan while Foot Recruit was displeased that she hasn't gotten her mark yet. Upon finding a loophole where a Foot Clan member who can outdo an acting leader can assume this position, Draxum leads the Foot Recruit into organizing a blunder for the Foot Lieutenant and the Foot Brute when the next Kuroi Yōroi fragment is at the botanical gardens. Meanwhile, the Turtles hold a contest to see who can withstand the smell of the corpse flower at the same botanical gardens.
35	35	"Mystic Library"	Sebastian Montes	Russ Carney & Ron Corcillo	Kevin Molina-Ortiz	June 29, 2019	120A	0.52
The Turtles plumb the depths of a mysterious hidden library in search of a way to rescue Mayhem from within April's bathroom mirror. While trying to be quiet, they must also evade not having a sound heard by the Bat Librarian's Hush-Bats and contend with the Foot Lieutenant and Brute.
36	36	"The Purple Game"	Alan Wan	Jesse Gordon	Christine Liu	July 6, 2019	120B	0.61
When a competitive new video game sweeps New York, Donnie will do anything to reach rank #1. Donnie is unaware that the video game was created by the Purple Dragons as a way of getting revenge on him where he secretly controls a giant robot that attacks the city.

=== Season 2 (2019–20) ===
No. overall	No. in season	Title	Directed by	Written by	Storyboarded by	Original release date	Prod. code	U.S. viewers (millions)
37	1	"Flushed, But Never Forgotten"	Alan Wan	Dale Malinowski	Kevin Molina-Ortiz	October 12, 2019	203	0.18
37	1	"Lair Games"	JJ Conway	Jesse Gordon	Sheldon Vella	October 12, 2019	203	0.18
"Flushed, But Never Forgotten": The Turtles learn a hard lesson in telling the truth when a secret that comes back to haunt them in the form of Splinter's pet goldfish Piebald who was accidentally flushed down the toilet by Leo a year prior and mutated after eating an Oozesquito. "Lair Games": April presents her award-winning documentary about the Turtles' annual summer event: The Lair Games. This year's event, however, takes a surprise turn when Donnie unexpectedly gains ground against the past games' constant champion, Leo, sparking a fierce competition between the two brothers.
38	2	"Man vs. Sewer"	Abe Audish	Dale Malinowski	Alicia Chan	October 19, 2019	121	0.15
38	2	"The Mutant Menace"	JJ Conway	Russ Carney & Ron Corcillo	Julia Braid, Jake Castorena and Matt Humphreys	October 19, 2019	121	0.15
"Man vs. Sewer": The Turtles' lazy river ride through the sewers turns savage when Raph is accidentally separated and left alone. This leads to him trying to survive the sewers and having an encounter with the crab mutant Sando Brothers. "The Mutant Menace": Baxter Stockboy begins revealing the Turtles' existence and turning public opinion against them to make some big money and as revenge. The Turtles' failed attempts to clear their image turn all of New York against them.
39	3	"Turtle-dega Nights: The Ballad of Rat Man"	Abe Audish	Jesse Gordon	Alicia Chan	October 26, 2019	122	0.19
39	3	"The Ancient Art of Ninja Hide and Seek"	Sebastian Montes	Ian Busch	Kevin Molina-Ortiz	October 26, 2019	122	0.19
"Turtle-dega Nights: The Ballad of Rat Man": Wanting to live with glory again, Splinter ropes Donnie and Mikey into modifying the Turtle Tank and entering it into a mutant demolition derby run by Big Mama. They face competition from Meat Sweats, Repo Mantis, Hypno-Potamus, and Warren Stone. It gets intense when Big Mama, the Fox Bellhop, the Otter Bellhop, and the Owl Bellhop get involved. "The Ancient Art of Ninja Hide and Seek": To prepare the Turtles for any future threats, Splinter teaches them some stealth training. After that is done, he sends them on a test to infiltrate the Grand Nexus Hotel to steal Gus's dog tags. When they appear to take too long, Splinter sneaks into the Grand Nexus Hotel, steals the Octopus Elevator Operator's outfit, and plans to find the Turtles before Gus, Big Mama, or the bellhops do.
40	4	"One Man's Junk"	Abe Audish	Russ Carney & Ron Corcillo	Chris Luc	November 2, 2019	123	0.10
40	4	"Snow Day"	Sebastian Montes	Dale Malinowski	Max Collins & Kai Lynn Jiang	November 2, 2019	123	0.10
"One Man's Junk": Donnie and Mikey try to recover a piece of the Dark Armor from Repo Mantis' scrap yard that he claimed. Though they will have to contend with Repo Mantis first. Meanwhile, Raph and Leo get impatient and check out a bus where they accidentally release Repo Mantis' pet cat Mrs. Nubbins. "Snow Day": The Turtles, April, and Mayhem are spending a snow day together. Meanwhile, Ghostbear has mutated into a mutant polar bear after coming in contact with an Oozesquito that Mikey defrosted. In this form, he uses his intangibility in a plot to ruin April and the Turtles' fun day in the snow by targeting their snowman.
41	5	"Cloak, and Swaggart"	Alan Wan	Jason Meier	Christine Liu	November 9, 2019	124	N/A
41	5	"Jupiter Jim Ahoy!"	Abe Audish	Ian Busch	Alicia Chan	November 9, 2019	124	N/A
"Cloak, and Swaggart": April helps Sunita in New York to search for her stolen cloaking brooch after attending a DIGG concert. They find that it was stolen by Meat Sweats so that he can regain his human form and his hosting job on "Kondescending Kitchen" from a bound and gagged Guy Flambe. Meanwhile, Splinter's plan to take the Turtles on a wilderness survival training backfires when Raph accidentally places the tank on lockdown for 24 hours. "Jupiter Jim Ahoy!": Having gotten bored of Splinter's Lou Jitsu stories, the Turtles head to a convention and meet Marcus Moncrief who portrays their favorite sci-fi movie character, Jupiter Jim. When they go to his apartment, they find that he has started to see the different trapped fans as the aliens that Jupiter Jim fought in the movies and comics where Marcus has become more immersed in his character to the point he thinks he is actually Jupiter Jim.
42	6	"Insane in the Mama Train"	Sebastian Montes	Jesse Gordon	Jake Castorena, JJ Conway, Kevin Molina-Ortiz and Sam Montes	November 16, 2019	125	0.06
With the help of Baron Draxum and the Guardsmen, the Foot Clan begins to move the nearly completed Kuroi Yōroi armor to a ritual site. To transport it, Draxum persuades Big Mama to lend the Foot Clan her train. After training the Turtles following the advice of his ancestors, Splinter prepares the Turtles for this fight.
43	7	"End Game"	Abe Audish	Russ Carney & Ron Corcillo	JJ Conway, Chris Luc, Sam Montes, Sam Syzmanski and Sheldon Vella	November 16, 2019	126	0.09
The Turtles have been captured, and Baron Draxum sends April back to have Splinter bring the final piece of the Kuroi Yōroi armor to him or else. As the faceplate is on his teapot, Splinter comes up with a plan to rescue his sons with the help of April, Bullhop, Frankenfoot, S.H.E.L.L.D.O.N, and Todd Capybara. When Draxum reassembles the armor and dons it, the Turtles must find a way to get the armor off of him.
44	8	"Many Unhappy Returns"	Kevin Molina-Ortiz & Sebastian Montes	Ian Busch	Jake Castorena, Alicia Chan, Phil Jacobson, Kevin Molina-Ortiz and Sam Montes	November 23, 2019	201	0.18
Now that the Shredder has been reconstructed, the Turtles must stop this persistent foe from shredding New York. Due to how the Shredder is acting, the Foot Clan retreats to figure out what went wrong. Problems arise when they split up to handle different things. Leo takes Splinter, who has a history with Big Mama, to the Grant Nexus Hotel to enlist her help while April and the Turtle trio work to fight Shredder. Though the condition is that Splinter and Leo must fight a Kraken in the Battle Nexus.
45	9	"Todd Scouts"	JJ Conway	Jesse Gordon	Jules Bridgers, Jake Castorena, Morgan Hillenbrand and Will Ruzika	November 30, 2019	202	0.15
45	9	"Goyles, Goyles, Goyles"	Abe Audish	Russ Carney & Ron Corcillo	Max Collins, Matt Humphreys and Andrew Kim	November 30, 2019	202	0.15
"Todd Scouts": Splinter has gotten fed up with his sons and their phones, so he leaves them in the forest with Todd supervising them. The Turtles need to learn how to listen and get in touch with nature to save Todd after he's captured by a group of dentists that mistook Todd for a Sasquatch. "Goyles, Goyles, Goyles": With Baron Draxum out of commission, Huginn and Muninn look for new work. After getting trapped by Meat Sweats, Huginn and Muninn recall their first day working for Draxum where their first mission is to obtain Lou Jitsu from the Battle Nexus.
46	10	"Breaking Purple"	JJ Conway	Josh Riley Brown	Christine Liu	April 24, 2020	204	N/A
46	10	"Repairin' the Baron"	Alan Wan	Russ Carney & Ron Corcillo	Alicia Chan & Max Collins	April 24, 2020	204	N/A
"Breaking Purple": Donnie's parenting causes S.H.E.L.L.D.O.N. to run away. When he makes his way to the park, he runs into the Purple Dragons who remove the restraining bolt from him and use him in their plans to win the drone races at the Thunder Dome hosted by Billionaire Guy Eccentric and obtain the Shadow Transmitter that would enable them to hack any system on the planet. Now Donatello must work to find S.H.E.L.L.D.O.N. and makeup with him before the Purple Dragons succeed in their plot. "Repairin' the Baron": The Council of Heads will forgive Garm and Freki if they bring Baron Draxum to the Hidden City to answer for his crimes that they assisted in. Raph finds out that April's new neighbor is Draxum, who is still recuperating and has Mikey as his guest. Mikey states that he is helping to get Draxum to tolerate humans as he still was the one who created them. When Mikey drags Raph into helping him by taking him to Albeartoland, they must also contend with Garm and Freki.
47	11	"Air Turtle"	Sebastian Montes	Jesse Gordon	Sheldon Vella	April 24, 2020	205	N/A
47	11	"Pizza Puffs"	JJ Conway	Russ Carney & Ron Corcillo	Mira Ongchua	April 24, 2020	205	N/A
"Air Turtle": Leo gets his dream job as the mascot of the local professional basketball team called the New York Daves owned by Tim Dunkman. Leo finds that the members of the New York Daves are terrible players and talks him into doing whatever it takes to change his mojo. He uses an ancient "good luck" arch called the Arch of Aquinonn that causes the players to become possessed by evil spirits that start to change them into demonic forms. "Pizza Puffs": Raph thwarts Meat Sweats' plans to sabotage his rivals with pizza puffs spiked with a mystic poison. When he finds that they ate the poisoned pizza puffs, Raph teaches his brothers a lesson in responsibility as the poisoned pizza puffs affect them in different ways. Raph must get them to solve things themselves as they track down Meat Sweats to find the antidote.
48	12	"Sidekick Ahoy!"	Jake Castorena	Ian Busch	Jake Castorena	May 15, 2020	206	N/A
48	12	"The Hidden City Job"	Sebastian Montes	Russ Carney & Ron Corcillo	Max Collins	May 15, 2020	206	N/A
"Sidekick Ahoy!": With Marcus Moncrief requires a sidekick for his latest "Jupiter Jim" project, the TMNT do all they can to win their dream job. When Raph wins, he and Marcus work to pursue the villainous Scor-Pion. Meanwhile, the others persuade Red Fox to return to Marcus. "The Hidden City Job": Leo and Señor Hueso help the reformed Capitán Piel on one last dangerous mission. This mission involves obtaining an item from an auction house owned by Big Mama.
49	13	"Always Be Brownies"	JJ Conway	Jesse Gordon	Christine Liu	May 15, 2020	207	N/A
49	13	"Mystery Meat"	Sebastian Montes	Russ Carney & Ron Corcillo	Sheldon Vella	May 15, 2020	207	N/A
"Always Be Brownies": April and Splinter encounter a gang of dangerous middle school brownie sellers at the time when April is selling cookies as part of a fundraiser to save the trees. What they soon discover is that these girl scouts are working for Grandma C.J. who is the alias of the Foot Recruit in her plans to get to world domination. "Mystery Meat": Baron Draxum is up for a lunch person award from the Superintendent of Cafeterias Vivian Slopworth. Thanks to an Oozesquito getting loose, Draxum's mystery meat concoction comes to life and terrorizes April's school by targeting every food there and eating it to grow big. When Michelangelo shows up, Draxum must defeat this creation called Sloppy Joseph without making use of his mystic abilities or endangering the school.
50	14	"Donnie vs. Witch Town"	Abe Audish	Ian Busch	Alicia Chan	June 19, 2020	208	N/A
50	14	"Raph's Ride-Along"	JJ Conway	Russ Carney & Ron Corcillo	Mira Ongchua	June 19, 2020	208	N/A
"Donnie vs. Witch Town": The Turtles, Splinter, and April visit the Hidden City. Always a man of science, Donnie can't accept April going to the witches of Witch Town for mystic help on a science project. They meet Mayor Mira who is holding a Peace Offering Day festival that honors Abigail the Good. Donnie starts to lose his temper and April gets help from Gentry in exchange for helping to catch aged worms for a peace potion to appease The Great Morgan. "Raph's Ride-Along": When he wants to go for a ride-along with the Hidden City Police, Raph is mistaken for a heinous criminal called Heinous Green and is taken to the maximum-security facility. Raph fools the Mud Dogs (consisting of Dastardly Danny, Malicious Mickey, and Loathsome Leonard) he is riding with that he is Heinous Green. Following the breakout, Raph states to the Mud Dogs that has a plan to have them apprehended until they have a run-in with Big Mama and the real Heinous Green.
51	15	"Hidden City's Most Wanted"	Jake Castorena	Jesse Gordon	Christine Liu	June 19, 2020	209	N/A
51	15	"Bad Hair Day"	Sebastian Montes	Russ Carney & Ron Corcillo	Gladyfaith Abcede & Max Collins	June 19, 2020	209	N/A
"Hidden City's Most Wanted": Splinter learns from Mikey that he gave Baron Draxum a cloaking broach to disguise him as Splinter takes them on a tour around the neighborhood. When Draxum's disguised form is taken by a Hidden City police officer as a gift for his daughter Heather, Mikey persuades Splinter into helping to rescue Draxum while having to contend with the Hidden City Police when the disguise is broken. "Bad Hair Day": Leo goes to the Hirsuté Resort and Spa to do a day of relaxation. Unfortunately, it is a private club for those who have hair and is thrown out by a double-sided centaur that works as a resort guard while being sent to the terrible club across the street. Their masseus states that the people in the club have hair and Leo gets a hair serum that gives him hair which gets him the Hirsuté Resort and Spa. Though he starts to sleepwalk when the hair has a mind of its own and starts stealing stuff and now must avoid being caught by the double-sided resort guard.
52	16	"Fists of Furry"	JJ Conway	Ian Busch	Morgan Hillenbrand	July 17, 2020	210	N/A
52	16	"The Clothes Don't Make the Turtle"	Jake Castorena	Jesse Gordon	Alicia Chan	July 17, 2020	210	N/A
"Fists of Furry": Splinter informs his sons about his Lou Jitsu Dojos in New York City. In his alias of Randall, he takes April on one of his inspections and finds out that all of his dojos have been taken over by the Komodo Dojo run by Kristoff van Bradford except for one where its students are not doing a good job with the infamous Lou Jitsu moves. To fend off the Komodo Dojo, Splinter trains April in each of the Lou Jitsu moves including the Seven Vipers move. "The Clothes Don't Make the Turtle": Raphael tries on new suits for the Magic Town House's "Night of a Million Secrets" event as Leo, Donnie, and Mikey try on different outfits as well. When they find that they are already here due to the selfies that were previously taken, they find that Hypno-Potamus was responsible for what had previously happened and were hypnotized by his hypnotic music into trying different clothes from the '80s so that Hypno-Potamus can target the journals that were written by Harry Houdini and learn how to bend reality with them.
53	17	"Battle Nexus: New York"	Kevin Molina-Ortiz & Alan Wan	Dale Malinowski	Max Collins & Christine Liu	July 17, 2020	211	N/A
Big Mama transforms New York into one big Battle Nexus. Raph, Leo, Mikey, and Donnie are paired up with Ghostbear, Carl Sando, Meat Sweats, and Hypno-Potamus against the Battle Nexus champions Troll, Sprite, Amphisbaena, and Cortex in different challenges. Meanwhile, Splinter, April, Baron Draxum, Todd, the Foot Recruit, and the people of New York are put on a cruise that is surrounded by a mystical barrier within the orb as they work to escape. Even when they beat their challengers, the Turtles will still have to contend with Big Mama's latest champion Shadow Fiend whose identity is someone they'd least suspect.
54	18	"Finale"	Sebastian Montes	Josh Riley Brown; Ian Busch, Russ Carney & Ron Corcillo, Tony Gama-Lobo and Dale Malinowski (parts 3 & 4 only)	Max Collins (parts 1-2 & 4); Sheldon Vella (parts 1-2); Morgan Hillebrand & Cassey Kuo (parts 2-4); Christine Liu (part 2); Jules Bridgers (part 3); Alicia Chan (parts 3-4); Jake Castorena, JJ Conway & Sebastian Montes (part 4)	August 7, 2020	212	N/A
55	19	"Finale"	JJ Conway	Josh Riley Brown; Ian Busch, Russ Carney & Ron Corcillo, Tony Gama-Lobo and Dale Malinowski (parts 3 & 4 only)	Max Collins (parts 1-2 & 4); Sheldon Vella (parts 1-2); Morgan Hillebrand & Cassey Kuo (parts 2-4); Christine Liu (part 2); Jules Bridgers (part 3); Alicia Chan (parts 3-4); Jake Castorena, JJ Conway & Sebastian Montes (part 4)	August 7, 2020	213	N/A
Part 1: E-Turtle Sunshine of the Spotless Mind: With the Shredder back with the Foot Clan, Baron Draxum enables the Turtles to enter Splinter's subconscious memories to search for the means of vanquishing their demonic foe for good. However, upon recovering the secret, they find out that its retrieval from the Twilight Realm comes at the price of fully unleashing the Shredder - although they also gain an unexpected new ally in his daughter Hamato Karai who was trapped in the Twilight Realm. Part 2: Shreddy or Not: With her return from the Twilight Realm, Karai proceeds to teach the Turtles about a mystical technique that would link them to the spirits of their Hamato ancestors, thus giving them the power to defeat their enemy. Before they can learn it, the Shredder, having regained his full consciousness, attacks their hideout. His attack forces the Turtles and April to evacuate while Splinter and Draxum remain behind to stall him. Part 3: Anatawa Hitorijanai: The Turtles are forced to retreat to the forests of New Jersey. April comes upon the mortally wounded Karai who transfers her soul into April's body, and then rejoins the Turtles to teach them the Hamato Ninpo. In Karai's stead, Shredder prepares to drain Splinter's life essence to make him fully invincible, but he needs a rare substance called Empyrean for the ritual. Draxum leads the Shredder to his lab in the Hidden City, where he has stored some Empyrean, only to turn against him upon realizing that the Shredder is the threat against which he intended to create his Yōkai army in the first place. Part 4: Rise: Now knowing where the Empyrean is, the Shredder promotes the Foot Recruit to be his new general, leaving the Foot Lieutenant and the Foot Brute trapped in the rubble. Upon visiting a recuperating Big Mama, the Turtles and April learn that the Shredder is going to the Crying Titan where the Empyrean is. As the Shredder prepares the ritual to drain Splinter's essence, Splinter tries to get the Foot Recruit to defect so that the Turtles can receive aid in defeating the Shredder. After their victory, Splinter announces Leo as the team's leader.

=== Shorts (2019–22) ===
No.	Title	Original release date
1	"Race"	November 27, 2019
The Turtles race to April's apartment.
2	"Turtle Tots"	November 27, 2019
The young turtles play with their original weapons.
3	"Sentient Bed"	August 2, 2022
Donatello reveals his latest invention to his brothers.
4	"Raph's Catchphrase"	August 2, 2022
Raph tries to come up with a new catchphrase while fighting the Foot Clan.
5	"C.O.W.A.B.U.N.G.A."	September 1, 2022
The Turtles play a basketball match with Meat Sweats.
6	"Cucumber-Mikey vs. Manticat"	September 1, 2022
For his online presence, Donnie has Mikey dress up as a Cucumber and has him go against Repo Mantis' pet cat.

== Broadcast ==
The series premiered on Nickelodeon in the United States on September 17, 2018. By that time, the series had already premiered as a sneak preview on YTV in Canada on July 27 the same year and was premiered officially on September 21 that year. In the United Kingdom, the show airs on Nicktoons and Channel 5. Episodes have also sometimes aired on both channels at the same time for terrestrial rights.

== DVD ==
Nickelodeon and Paramount Home Entertainment released two single-volume DVDs of the series, each containing 6-7 non-sequential episodes from season 1. Season 2 has never been released on DVD.

Volume Title	Season	Episodes	Region 1 Release Date	Region 2 Release Date
Rise of the Teenage Mutant Ninja Turtles	1	7	March 12, 2019	July 15, 2019
This release contains seven episodes from season one: "Mystic Mayhem", "Donnie's Gifts", "War and Pizza", "Shell in a Cell", "Origami Tsunami", "Mascot Melee", and "Minotaur Maze".
Mutant Mania	1	6	February 4, 2020	March 15, 2020
This release contains six episodes from season one: "The Evil League of Mutants", "Repo Mantis", "Bug Busters", "Hypno! Part Deux", "Stuck on You", and "Al Be Back".

== Awards and nominations ==
Year	Award	Category	Recipient	Result	Refs
2019	Annie Awards	Best Animated Television/Broadcast Production for Children	Rise of the Teenage Mutant Ninja Turtles	Nominated	
2019	Annie Awards	Outstanding Achievement for Animated Effects in an Animated Television/Broadcast Production	Jeffrey Lai	Nominated	
2019	Annie Awards	Outstanding Achievement for Storyboarding in an Animated Television/Broadcast Production	Kevin Molina-Ortiz	Won	
2019	Kids' Choice Awards	Favorite Cartoon	Rise of the Teenage Mutant Ninja Turtles	Nominated	
2019	Daytime Emmy Awards	Outstanding Children's Animated Series	Rise of the Teenage Mutant Ninja Turtles	Nominated	
2020	Annie Awards	Best Animated Television/Broadcast Production for Children	Rise of the Teenage Mutant Ninja Turtles	Nominated	
2021	Annie Awards	Best Animated Television/Broadcast Production for Children	Rise of the Teenage Mutant Ninja Turtles	Nominated	
2021	Annie Awards	Outstanding Achievement for Directing in an Animated Television/Broadcast Production	Alan Wan	Nominated	

== Film ==
On February 5, 2019, it was announced that a feature film based on the series was in production for Netflix, along with a feature film based on The Loud House. Rise of the Teenage Mutant Ninja Turtles: The Movie follows Leonardo forced to lead his brothers Raph, Donnie, and Mikey against alien invaders known as the Krang. Casey Jones makes his debut and is voiced by Haley Joel Osment. The film had been slated to release in 2021, but ended up landing an August 5, 2022 release date.

== Merchandise and media ==
=== Comics ===
IDW published a comic book based on the series, beginning in July 2018. The comics concluded with an introductory issue (#0), a five-issue main story and a Halloween Comicfest special. After a period of inactivity, it was continued with a three-issue story arc titled "Sound Off!" from July to September 2019.

=== Toys ===
On February 16, 2018, the first toys based on the series were presented during the New York City Toy Fair. The first Rise of the Teenage Mutant Ninja Turtles toys were released on October 1, 2018.

In August 2018, the American fast-food chain Sonic Drive-In released a set of kids' meal toys based on the series, which were available in their Wacky Pack meals.

=== Video game ===
During the months leading up to the series' launch, Viacom and Nintendo collaborated to market Rise of the Teenage Mutant Ninja Turtles via a special limited-time online multiplayer event for the 2017 video game Splatoon 2, in which Inklings can participate in a Splatfest tournament, battling over which of the four brothers is the best. Donnie won overall, beating Mikey in the first round, and Raph (who had in turn beat Leo) in the finals.
