= National African American Leadership Summit =

American summit event

The National African American Leadership Summit (NAALS) emerged out a series of unification meetings initiated by Dr. Benjamin Chavis, who was the executive director of the National Association for the Advancement of Colored People (NAACP). At one of those unification meetings, Dr Chavis asked for and received permission to use the name "African American Leadership Summit" as long as the word "National" was included, from Stephen E. Davis, President of the New York based, African American Leadership Summit.

After Dr. Chavis departed from his post at the NAACP, he convened a series of independent summit conferences for the leaders of civil rights organizations that led to the founding of NAALS in June, 1995.

NAALS was the primary civil rights organization that actively supported the Million Man March.

== Dr. Benjamin Chavis and the origins of National Civil Rights Summitry ==
The practice of convening summit meetings of the leadership of national civil rights organizations began during the 1990s.

Dr. Benjamin Chavis was elected the executive director of the National Association for the Advancement of Colored People (NAACP).

Dr. Chavis advocated an expansionist membership program and a nationalist agenda that received popular support but became controversial within the NAACP.

In August, 1994, Dr. Chavis announced his retirement from the NAACP, and on the next day he convened an informal summit of civil rights leaders in Baltimore.

In December, 1994, Dr. Chavis convened a second civil rights summit in Chicago.

== Planning and organization of the Million Man March ==
During these informal meetings, the group formulated a plan to organize the largest march on Washington in American history, a project that became known as the Million Man March (MMM).

In June 1995, Dr. Chavis announced the formation of the National African American Leadership Summit (NAALS) and the location of the next summit.

On June 19, 1995, Dr. Chavis convened the Houston Summit of NAALS at Texas Southern University where a constitution and by-laws were adopted.

NAALS participated with other civil rights organizations in the planning and implementation of the MMM.

Dr. Chavis served as National Director of the Million Man March Organizing Committee that was established by NAALS.

== NAALS and the American Civil Rights Movement ==
In the aftermath of the MMM, NAALS became the central nexus for policy formation for the American civil rights movement.

In December 1995, NAALS convened a national civil rights summit at Howard University. At this summit, Dr. Chavis outlined a nine point civil rights agenda.

1. A moral and spiritual renewal
2. Economic development and the establishment of the African American Economic Development Trust
3. Organization of a national African American youth leadership movement and an African American Youth Day
4. Development of a comprehensive education strategy for African Americans
5. The Abundant Life National Health Plan
6. Establishment of a national and international Black Communications Network
7. Sponsorship of an annual Black Political Convention
8. Seek an end to the death penalty and challenge the GOP's Contract with America
9. Convene a summit meeting of Black and Caribbean Ambassadors in Washington, DC

Dr. Chavis served as executive director of NAALS from its formation until 1997.

== Sources ==
- "Chavis returns to national rights scene at head of new group," June 1, 1995, Associated Press.
- "Leadership Summit sets black agenda following Million Man March," December, 1995, Jet Magazine.
