= Benjamin Chavis =

African-American civil rights activist (born 1948)

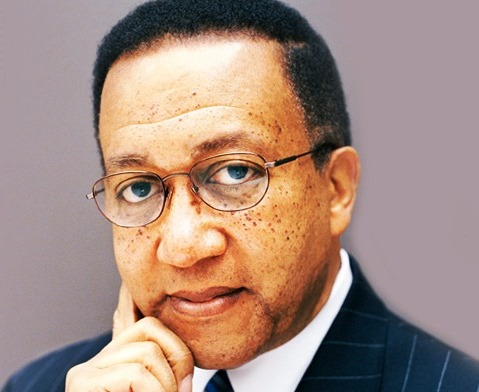

Executive Director of the National Association for the Advancement of Colored People
- In office 1993–1994
- Preceded by: Benjamin Hooks
- Succeeded by: Earl Shinhoster

Personal details
- Born: Benjamin Franklin Chavis Jr. January 22, 1948 (age 78) Oxford, North Carolina, U.S.
- Education: St. Augustine University; University of North Carolina, Charlotte (BA); Duke University (MDiv); Howard University (DMin); Union Theological Seminary

Benjamin Franklin Chavis Jr. (born January 22, 1948) is an African-American activist, author, journalist, ordained minister in the United Church of Christ, and the current president and CEO of the National Newspaper Publishers Association. He serves as national co-chair for the political organization No Labels.

In his youth, Chavis was a youth coordinator and SCLC assistant to Martin Luther King Jr., who inspired him to work in the civil rights movement. At the age of 23, Chavis rose to international prominence in 1971 as the leader of the Wilmington Ten in North Carolina, civil rights activists who were unjustly convicted of committing arson. As the oldest of the ten, Chavis received the longest sentence of 34 years in North Carolina prisons. The Wilmington Ten convictions and sentences were appealed and overturned, and in 1980 all ten were freed by the U.S. 4th Circuit Court of Appeals due to "prosecutorial misconduct." Chavis returned to graduate school and the field of civil rights, and he became a vice president of the National Council of Churches in 1988 in New York City.

In 1993, the national board of directors of the NAACP elected Benjamin F. Chavis, Jr as the executive director and CEO of the civil rights organization. Chavis later served in 1995 as the National Director of the Million Man March, and the Founder and CEO of the National African American Leadership Summit (NAALS). Since 2001, he has been CEO and Co-Chairman of the Hip-Hop Summit Action Network, in New York City which he co-founded with hip-hop mogul Russell Simmons.

On June 24, 2014, Chavis became the president and CEO of the National Newspaper Publishers Association, an African-American organization which focuses on supporting and advocating for publishers of the nation's more than 230 black newspapers.

== Early life ==
Benjamin Franklin Chavis Jr. was born and grew up in Oxford, North Carolina. He claimed to be a direct descendant of the revolutionary minister John Chavis. In 1960 at the age of twelve, Chavis became the first African American to be issued a library card at the segregated public library. He graduated from Mary Potter High School in 1965 and entered St. Augustine College in Raleigh as a freshman. He earned a Bachelor of Arts in Chemistry from the University of North Carolina at Charlotte (1969).

Chavis worked in the civil rights movement, leading a march in 1970 to the state capital in protest after three white men were acquitted of killing Henry D. Marrow in Oxford. He was a leader of the Wilmington Ten, who all were convicted of arson during a civil rights protest in the city for school desegregation. The oldest at 24, he was sentenced to 34 years in prison and served two years. The convictions and sentences were appealed. In 1980 the federal appeals court overturned the convictions, citing "prosecutorial misconduct." and ordering a new trial. The state of North Carolina decided against a trial. North Carolina Governor Beverly Perdue issued "Pardons of innocence" to each member of the Wilmington 10 on December 31, 2012.

Chavis received his Master of Divinity (magna cum laude) from Duke University (1980) and a Doctor of Ministry (D.Min.) from Howard University (1981). Chavis was admitted into the PhD program in Systematic Theology as a graduate student at Union Theological Seminary of Columbia University and completed all of the academic course requirements in 1984.

== Career ==
=== Civil rights and political activities ===
In 1963, while a high school student, Chavis became a statewide youth coordinator in North Carolina for Martin Luther King Jr. and the Southern Christian Leadership Conference (SCLC). He also joined CORE, SNCC and AFSCME.

In 1968, Chavis also worked for the presidential campaign of Robert F. Kennedy. After his graduation from UNCC in 1969, Chavis returned to Oxford and taught at the Mary Potter High School, which were still segregated for African-American students although federal courts had ordered the state to desegregate. In 1970, after the killing of 23-year-old Henry Marrow and the acquittal by an all-white jury of the three men indicted on charges, Chavis organized a protest march from Oxford to North Carolina's State Capitol Building, in Raleigh. After the Oxford-to-Raleigh march, Chavis organized a black boycott of white businesses in Oxford that lasted for 18 months until the town agreed to integrate its public facilities, including schools.

Chavis was appointed Field Officer in the United Church of Christ Commission for Racial Justice in 1968.

Chavis was ordained in the United Church of Christ in 1980 and in 1985 was named the executive director and CEO of the UCC-CRJ.

In February 1997, Chavis announced his conversion to Islam; he took the name Benjamin Chavis Muhammad. He was subsequently defrocked by the United Church of Christ.

=== Wilmington Ten ===
In 1971 the Commission for Racial Justice assigned Field Officer Chavis to Wilmington, North Carolina to help desegregate the public school system. Since the city had abruptly closed the black high school, laid off its principal and most of its teachers, and distributed the students to other schools, there had been conflicts with white students. The administration did not hear their grievances, and the students organized a boycott to protest for their civil rights.

Chavis and nine others were arrested in February 1972, charged with conspiracy and arson. Following a controversial trial, all ten were convicted in 1972. The oldest man at age 24, Chavis drew the longest sentence, 34 years. The ten were incarcerated while supporters pursued appeals. The case of the Wilmington Ten was condemned internationally as a political prosecution.

In 1978 Amnesty International described Benjamin Chavis and eight others of the Wilmington Ten still in prison as "American political prisoners" under the definition of the Universal Rights of Man and the UN Universal Declaration of Human Rights. They were prisoners of conscience. In December 1980, the Federal Fourth Circuit Court of Appeals ordered a new trial and overturned the original conviction because of "prosecutorial misconduct."

Chavis drew from this experience in his books: An American Political Prisoner Appeals for Human Rights (1978) (written while he was still in prison) and Psalms from Prison. In 1978, Chavis was named as one of the first winners of the Letelier-Moffitt Human Rights Award.

On December 31, 2012, Chavis and the surviving members of the Wilmington Ten were granted Pardons of Innocence by North Carolina Governor Beverly Perdue. The New York Times editorialized for the pardons of innocence for the Wilmington 10 as the case had become an international cause celebre as an example of virulent racist political prosecution.

=== Environmental racism ===
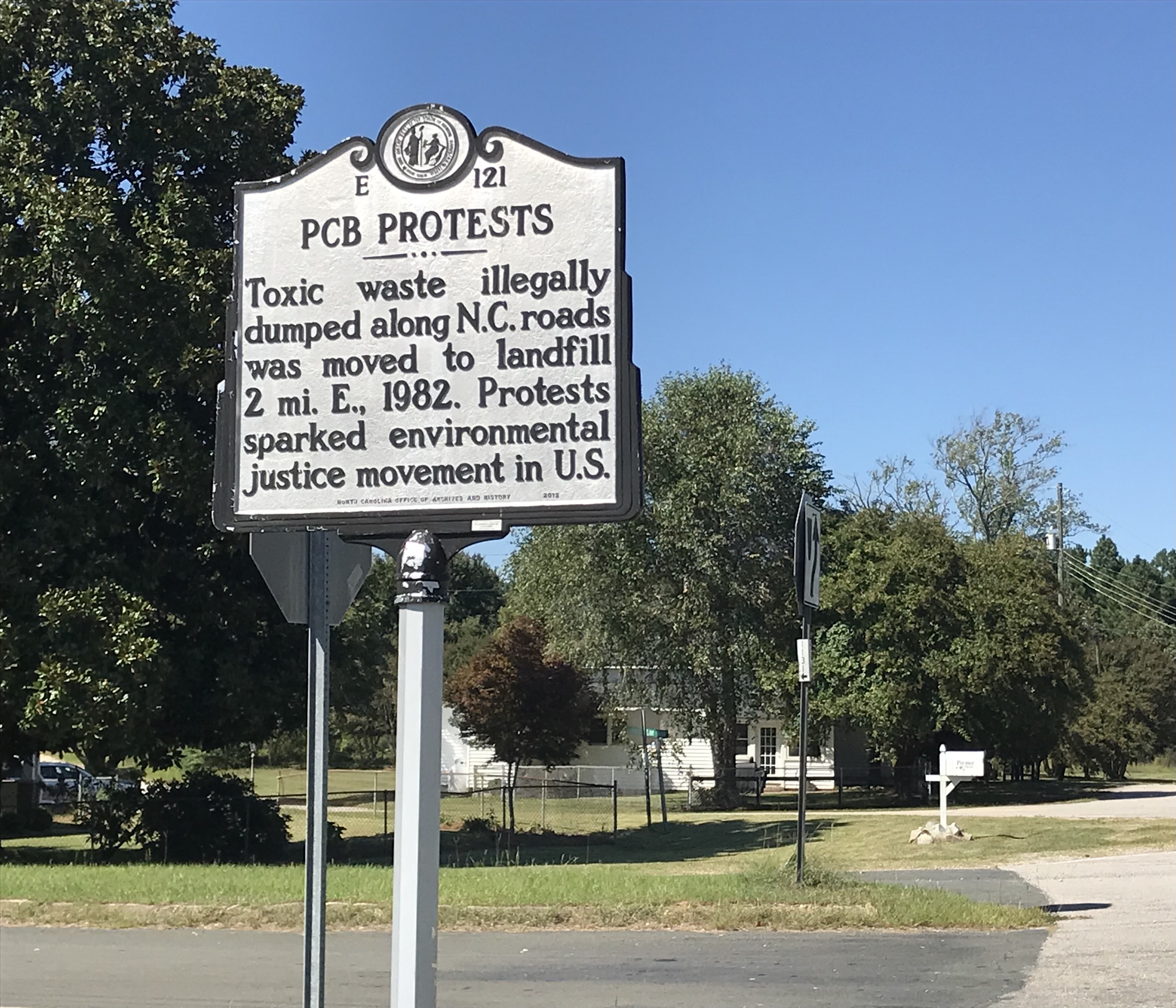
Highway marker in Warren County commemorating 1982 PCB landfill protests

Some have asserted that Chavis coined the term environmental racism in 1982, during environmental justice protests in Warren County, North Carolina, although Carolyn A. Burrow (Adjoa Aiyetero) had used the term in 1970. Over the past four decades, Chavis has emerged as the "Godfather of the Environmental Justice Movement." Some have asserted that Benjamin Chavis cried out: "this is environmental racism!" at the moment of his arrest during the 1982 PCB landfill protests in North Carolina, but legal scholar Richard J. Lazarus found this likely apocryphal; Chavis first was recorded using the term in 1987. He writes in the foreword of a 1993 testimonial of the environmental justice movement:

Environmental racism is racial discrimination in environmental policymaking. It is racial discrimination in the enforcement of regulations and laws. It is racial discrimination in the deliberate targeting of communities of color for toxic waste disposal and the siting of polluting industries. It is racial discrimination in the official sanctioning of the life-threatening presence of poisons and pollutants in communities of color. And, it is racial discrimination in the history of excluding people of color from the mainstream environmental groups, decisionmaking boards, commissions, and regulatory bodies.

In 1986 Chavis conducted and published the landmark national study: Toxic Waste and Race in the United States of America, that statistically revealed the correlation between race and the location of toxic waste throughout the United States. Chavis is considered by many environmental grassroots activists to be the "Godfather of the post-modern environmental justice movement" that has steadily grown throughout the nation and world since the early 1980s.

=== National Council of Churches ===
In 1988, Chavis was elected vice president of the National Council of Churches. Chavis also served as chairman of its Prophetic Justice unit as a Minister of the United Church of Christ. In 2013, Chavis began writing weekly columns for the National Newspaper Association. His columns both insightful and educational, have been published in the country's leading minority newspapers, such as The AFRO. Theologically, Chavis has worked for decades on identifying the common points of unity between the three Abrahamic faiths of Judaism, Christianity and Islam. Today, Chavis continues to work on ecumenical and interfaith matters across the United States and throughout the world.

=== NAACP ===
In 1993, Chavis was selected as the executive director and CEO of the National Association for the Advancement of Colored People (NAACP), the youngest to hold this office. Chavis first joined the organization at the age of twelve as a youth leader of the Granville County, North Carolina NAACP Branch.

Chavis traveled to a Los Angeles, CA housing project to "get to the heart of the issue," stating that in economically deprived areas, youth often go from childhood to adulthood with no adolescence because of the economic demands. On August 28, 1993, NAACP Chairman William Gibson, Executive Director Benjamin F. Chavis Jr., Coretta Scott King, William Fauntroy, and AFL-CIO's Lane Kirkland joined to organize the 30th Anniversary March on Washington for Economic Democracy. In 1993, President Clinton named Chavis to the twenty-five-member President's Council on Sustainable Development to help develop U.S. policies that would encourage economic growth, job creation, and environmental protection.

The NAACP in 1993 received a $2 million commitment from the estate of the late Reginald F. Lewis to establish the NAACP Reginald F. Lewis Memorial Endowment.

Chavis spoke on the PBS series Earthkeeping. He said that "environmental racism" was a life-and-death issue and noted the work of the NAACP to end it. Chavis said that often people of color were excluded from decisions on public policy. The NAACP organized Branches to speak out on the issue and advocated for reform of the Superfund legislation.

In 1994, Chavis set the NAACP's focus on economic empowerment to ensure a strong economic infrastructure for the African-American and other communities of color. The NAACP created a Telecommunications Task Force of board members and industry leaders to ensure that African Americans took part in the ownership, management, and total employment package of President Clinton's proposed "National Information Superhighway."

The NAACP conducted a voter education teleconference in seventeen cities across the U.S. to prepare South African citizens residing in the U.S. and NAACP volunteers for participation in the special South African elections on April 26.

Through the NAACP Community Development Resource Centers (CDRC), the association established the Youth Entrepreneurial Institute to sharpen business acumen and launch enterprises for students ages fourteen to eighteen. In May 1994, Chavis led the NAACP and other organizations in sponsoring a youth summit to seek solutions to the drugs and violence in their communities.

In August 1994 Chavis was dismissed by the NAACP executive board in a 53 to 5 vote over a report that he had authorized payment of NAACP funds to his former assistant to drop a sexual discrimination claim. Chavis sued the NAACP but a settlement was reached in October 1994.

=== Advocacy and leadership ===
In 1994, Chavis convened summit conferences of civil rights leaders in Baltimore in August and in Chicago in December. In June 1995, they founded the National African American Leadership Summit (NAALS). A constitution and by-laws were adopted that month. Chavis served as executive director and CEO of NAALS from 1995 to 1997.

In 1995, NAALS appointed Chavis to serve as the National Director of the Million Man March Organizing Committee that conceived, designed, arranged and promoted the Million Man March.

=== Newspaper and radio ===
Chavis wrote a nationally syndicated newspaper column Civil Rights Journal from 1985 to 1993. At the same time, he produced and hosted a national radio program of the same name.

=== Hip-hop ===
The journey into the hip-hop culture actually had its roots for Chavis dating back to 1969 when he was the proprietor and regular "DJ" and "MC" for The Soul Kitchen Disco in his hometown of Oxford, North Carolina. In the 1970s, Chavis saw the connection between the urban culture of underground music and the post-civil rights era. During the 1980s, Chavis witnessed the growing popularity of hip-hop with disfranchised youth entrapped into urban poverty.

While serving as a mentor to Sister Souljah, Kevin Powell, Little Rob, Ras Baraka and other hip-hop activists, Chavis met Russell Simmons and Lyor Cohen in 1986 at Def Jam Records. As head of the NAACP in 1993, he worked with Run DMC to mobilize youth voters. Hip-hop's premier video director, Hype Williams, cast Chavis in the pivotal role as the "Rev. Saviour" in the 1998 hip-hop classic movie Belly, which starred superstar hip-hop artists Nas, Method Man and DMX.

Chavis performed the Intro and Outro to Jim Jones and the Diplomats 2004 hip-hop album, "On My Way to Church." In 2005, Chavis was the spoken word artist feature in Cassidy's latest platinum selling album I'm a Hustla. When Chavis helped organize both the Million Man March (1995) and Million Family March (2000), Russell Simmons worked with him to mobilize hip-hop leaders to support the marches. Ultimately, the two men realized they had a similar vision for this generation of hip-hop youth, and to that end, they created the first national "Hip-Hop Summit" in New York City, from which grew the Hip-Hop Summit Action Network (HSAN).

One-and-a-half years later, HSAN was the largest and broadest national coalition of hip-hop artists, recording industry executives, youth activists and civil rights leaders. With the support of the major hip-hop labels, the Recording Industry Association of America (RIAA) and others, the HSAN has sponsored "Hip-Hop Summits" in New York, New York, Kansas City, Missouri, Oakland, California, Los Angeles, California, Washington, DC, Miami, Florida, Seattle, Washington, and Dallas, Texas.

Meetings with the Federal Trade Commission (FTC), Federal Communications Commission (FCC), vocal stands before the U.S. Congress on the unconstitutionality of censoring rap lyrics, the development of literacy programs, Youth Councils, voter registration drives in conjunction with Rap The Vote, the voice for the poor, and the fight for children's public education, fill Chavis' days (and nights).

In 2002, Chavis and the HSAN joined the United Federation of Teachers and the New York Alliance for Quality Education (AQE) to organize the largest public demonstration since New York City Mayor Michael Bloomberg took office. The Washington Post reported, "Hip-hop's brightest stars, from P. Diddy to Jay-Z to Alicia Keys, lent a little star power today to a demonstration by roughly 100,000 students, teachers and rap fans who crammed eight blocks outside City Hall to protest drastic school budget cuts proposed by the new mayor."

Chavis joined "Sex and the City" star Cynthia Nixon, actor Bruce Willis and Russell Simmons to demand adequate funding for education across the state of New York.

Chavis was a spokesperson for T.I.'s Respect My Vote campaign, and introduced T.I.'s performance at the 2008 FAMU Homecoming Concert in Tallahassee Florida that was hosted by FAMU and Blazin 102.3.

=== Entrepreneurial activities ===
As a longstanding advocate of entrepreneurial activities for youth and minorities, Chavis has assisted, consulted and headed several commercial projects ranging from franchising to film production and publishing.

In 2007 Chavis headed H3 Enterprises and the HipHopSodaShop, the first hip-hop corporation that soon opened two shops in Tampa and Miami, Florida. Due to pre-existing conditions, H3 closed the shops, and Chavis retired. One year later, H3 Enterprises sued Chavis for mismanagement, however an amicable settlement was reached in this case after the routine countersuit of Chavis.

Chavis was the president of Education Online Services in Fort Lauderdale, until he retired to accept other opportunities for professional advancement. He serves as the senior strategic advisor to the Diamond Empowerment Fund in New York. In June 2014, the National Newspaper Publishers Association elected Chavis to the office of president of their two hundred member association.

A popular public speaker, Chavis frequently addresses academic, commercial and non-profit organizations and is a prominent spokesman in the national and international media.

=== Past memberships ===
- CEO and founder of the National African American Leadership Summit
- Chairman of the Prophetic Justice Unit of the National Council of Churches (NCC)
- Co-chair of the Southern Organizing Committee for Economic/Social Justice
- President of the Angolan Foundation
- Co-founder of the National Black Independent Political Party
- President of the board of the Washington Office on Africa
- Member of the Clinton/Gore Transition Team for the National Resources Center
- Co-founder of the UNC-Charlotte Black Student Union

== Personal life ==
Chavis was married to the late Martha Rivera Chavis and is the father of eight children, three of whom are by his first wife, the late Jackie Bullock Chavis. He is a member of Phi Beta Sigma fraternity. Chavis has told an interviewer he reads books on chemistry, for pleasure.

== In popular culture ==
- Chavis appeared as "The Minister" in Hype Williams' 1998 crime film Belly.
- Chavis appeared in skits on Jim Jones' debut album On My Way to Church, as well as the track "Concrete Jungle" on Jones' third studio album, Hustler's P.O.M.E.
- Chavis has been mistakenly listed as being the voice during the chorus on "Ringing Bells", a track from Masta Killa's album Made In Brooklyn. It is actually Minister Louis Farrakhan's voice used on the track.
- Chavis also appeared on a track called "The Message" on Cassidy's I'm a Hustla.
- Chavis appeared in Spike Lee's film about the Million Man March, Get on the Bus.
- Chavis is featured as the protagonist in the critically acclaimed autobiographical work by Tim Tyson, Blood Done Sign My Name and the critically acclaimed film of the same title where the part of the young Benjamin Chavis is played by Nate Parker.

== Publications ==
- Chavis, Benjamin (1979). An African American Political Prisoner: Appeals for Human Rights.
- Chavis, Benjamin (1983). Psalms from Prison.
- Commission for Racial Justice - United Church of Christ (1987). Toxic Wastes and Race In The United States: A National Report On The Racial and Socioeconomic Characteristics of Communities With Hazardous Waste Sites. New York: Public Data Access, Inc. Archived from the original on January 9, 2006.

Non-profit organization positions
Preceded by Benjamin Hooks	Executive Director of the National Association for the Advancement of Colored People; 1993–1994	Succeeded by Earl Shinhoster
