= Nate Parker =

American actor and filmmaker (born 1979)

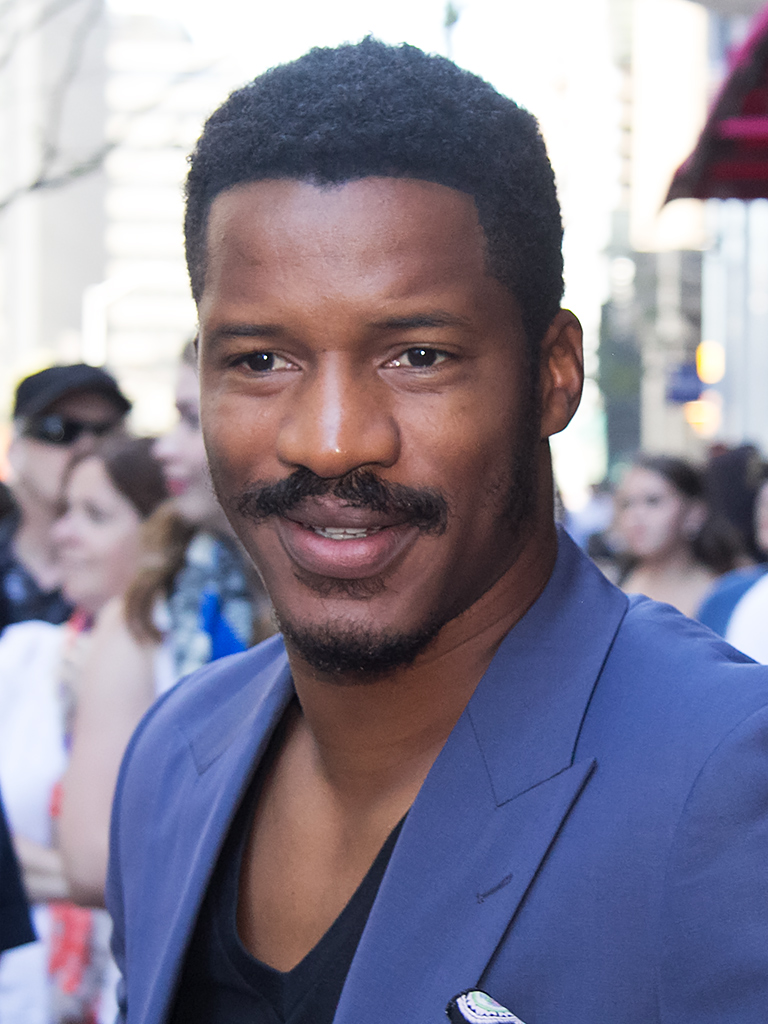
- Parker at the 2014 Toronto International Film Festival
- Born: November 18, 1979 (age 47); Norfolk, Virginia, U.S.
- Occupations: Actor, filmmaker
- Years active: 2004–present
- Spouse: Sarah DiSanto (m. 2007)
- Children: 5

Nate Parker (born November 18, 1979) is an American actor and filmmaker. He has appeared in Beyond the Lights, Red Tails, The Secret Life of Bees, The Great Debaters, Arbitrage, Non-Stop, Felon, and Pride.

He made his debut as a director with his drama film, The Birth of a Nation, in which he also starred. It made history at the 2016 Sundance Film Festival when Fox Searchlight Pictures acquired the distribution rights for $17.5 million, breaking the record for the most paid for a Sundance Film Festival production. It surpassed Little Miss Sunshine, which ten years earlier had been acquired by Searchlight for $10 million. The film was ultimately unsuccessful in wide release but received positive reviews. However, its reception was affected by news of rape allegations made against Parker.

== Early life ==
Parker was born in Norfolk, Virginia, to Carolyn Whitfield, a 17-year-old single mother. Although she did not marry his biological father, Parker had a relationship with his father until the man died from cancer when Parker was 11. Carolyn married after the birth of her son, and her husband gave Parker his surname. The couple divorced.

Carolyn married again, to Walter Whitford, who was in the United States Air Force and was stationed in Bath, Maine. Parker has four younger sisters.

At the age of 14, after problems at home with his stepfather Walter, Parker moved to Virginia Beach, Virginia to live with his maternal uncle, Jay Combs. Combs, a former wrestler, encouraged Parker to join the wrestling team at Princess Anne High School. He then attended Churchland High School and continued on their wrestling team. Lastly, he attended Great Bridge High School before attending Penn State University on a wrestling scholarship in 1999.

=== Wrestling ===
Parker placed third in the Virginia High School League state wrestling championships as a junior while attending Churchland High School. Parker's mother moved to the Great Bridge High School district so Parker could participate in its wrestling program. He was a member of the 1997–98 state champion Great Bridge wrestling team and was a state champion 135-pound (61 kg) wrestler who placed third in the High School National Wrestling Championships, while becoming a high school All-American.

Parker earned a full scholarship to wrestle at Penn State University. At Penn State, Parker was nationally ranked as a freshman.

After transferring to the University of Oklahoma, Parker continued to be ranked as a redshirt junior 141-pound (64 kg) wrestler. In 2002, Parker placed fifth at the National Collegiate Athletic Association wrestling championships and became an All-American at Oklahoma. Following his fifth-place finish, he was ranked second nationally as a redshirt senior.

== Career ==
=== Acting ===
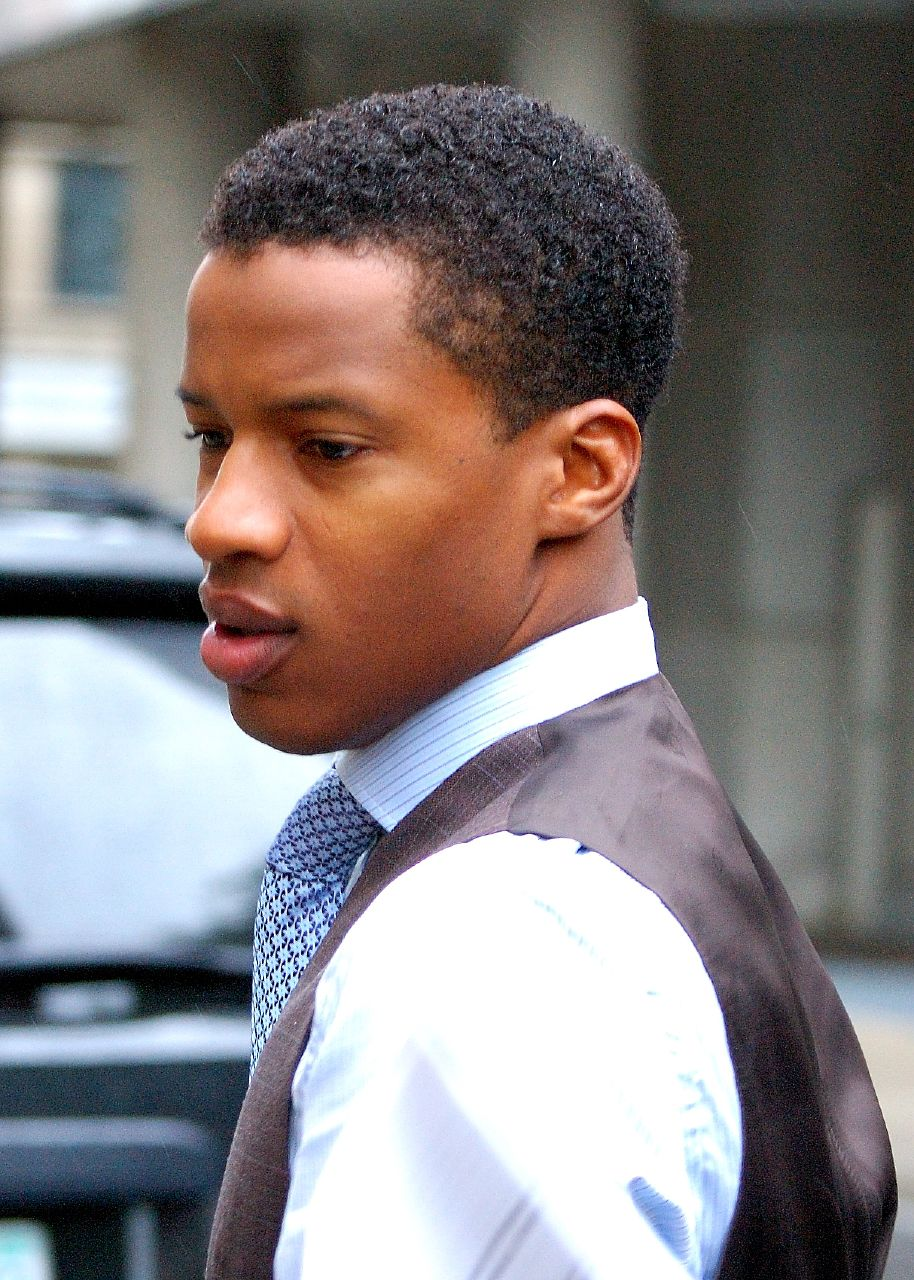
Parker at the 2008 Toronto International Film Festival

Parker, who was working as a computer programmer, was discovered by Los Angeles talent manager Jon Simmons while attending an event in Dallas with a model friend. Simmons had Parker audition and make a tape, and urged him to go to Los Angeles. Parker moved a week later, had Simmons as his agent, and three months later was acting in his first movie.

In 2006, Parker played the male lead in Rome & Jewel, a hip-hop take on Romeo and Juliet that got cancelled and then re-released in 2008. Parker's title character, a modern day Romeo, was a Compton youth. Parker's rap performance in the film earned comparisons to Will Smith from Nathan Lee of The New York Times. In 2007, he had a small role in Pride, about an African American swim team.

In 2007, Parker played the role of Henry Lowe in the Denzel Washington-directed film The Great Debaters. The character was based on the real-life debater Henry Heights, from Wiley College. Parker attended a debate boot camp to make his performance more authentic. He portrayed a multifaceted character. Stephen Holden of The New York Times described Parker's portrayal as having depicted a "handsome, clean-cut youth with a lurking bad-boy streak", while John Clark of the New York Daily News described the role as that of a "silver-tongued orator and ladies' man". Other reviewers also noted the nuances of the character. Parker also performed on the soundtrack. Parker and co-stars Forest Whitaker and Denzel Washington were all nominated for the 2008 NAACP Image Awards in the best supporting actor category, which Denzel Washington won. Parker would develop a continuing relationship with Wiley College.

in 2008, Parker performed in a pair of low-budget movies: Felon and Tunnel Rats. Despite these early light roles, Parker's onscreen charisma and general je ne sais quoi showed, earning Parker comparisons to Paul Newman. In Felon, Parker played a rookie guard dealing with inner turmoil. Parker appeared as Private Jim Lidford in Tunnel Rats, a 2008 German-Canadian war film about tunnel rat soldiers during the Vietnam War. The film stars Michael Paré, Brandon Fobbs, and Wilson Bethel, and was written and directed by Uwe Boll.

In 2008's The Secret Life of Bees, Parker played the good-hearted love interest of Alicia Keys' character. Parker's character has to deal with the challenges of spurned love. The movie was written and directed by Gina Prince-Bythewood, and based on the book of the same name by Sue Monk Kidd.

In the 2010 film Blood Done Sign My Name, based on a true story of small-town racial turmoil set against a backdrop of segregation in 1970, Parker plays a 22-year-old Benjamin Chavis. Parker's Chavis was a teacher who had been born into an affluent African-American family and would later become the Executive Director of the N.A.A.C.P. A. O. Scott of The New York Times described Parker as "diffident" and his portrayal as "thoughtful, morally serious". Steven Rea of the Philadelphia Inquirer notes that events in the film move Parker with both "resolve and rage": Roger Ebert described Parker's Chavis as "energized and angered" in one of the two main storylines of the film that started with Chavis leading an economic boycott after an adverse court verdict. Parker's character was upstaged according to Scott and Ebert. However, Michael Phillips of the Chicago Tribune noted that Parker's portrayal infused dimension into Chavis, whose cousin's death was the subject of the film. Phillips noted that the role showed that with the right choices Parker had the potential to be a big star in the future.

In 2012, Parker appeared as a World War II squadron commander in Red Tails, a film portraying Tuskegee Airmen. Parker's character drinks to cope with the stress of the fighter pilot lifestyle. In the movie, Parker plays Marty "Easy" Julian who commanded the escorts for the World War II bombers in the face of Nazi fighter planes. While Peter Travers of Rolling Stone noted that Parker shone in his role, Wesley Morris of The Boston Globe felt Oyelowo stood out. Although the story is a fictionalization, Bilge Ebiri of New York and Holden note that the relationship between the two is the story's central one. Holden compared Parker's presence to that of Denzel Washington's. In Arbitrage, Parker's talents were underutilized as the son of a chauffeur who gets caught in a murder coverup, according to David Denby of The New Yorker. Nonetheless, Ty Burr of The Boston Globe notes that Parker's portrayal of the Harlem native is the only sympathetic character of the film. Travers notes the role provides Richard Gere's elitist character with his only interactions with a diverse character in the film. Parker's third and final film of 2012 was Spike Lee's Red Hook Summer. Parker played a gang member named Box, whose role was not central to the film progression according to Phillips.

In 2013, he had a supporting role in Ain't Them Bodies Saints that Richard Brody of The New Yorker described as being a bar owner who is among an "enticing array of characters". The role was minor according to Scott.

In a 2014 interview with BET during publicity for the film Beyond the Lights that included Parker and director Gina Prince-Bythewood, Parker stated that in order to "preserve the black man" he would not be willing to act in certain character roles. The video was later taken down and is no longer available. In 2014, Parker also stated he would not take roles, such as gay characters, that he considered to be "emasculating".

Kate Taylor of The Globe and Mail described Parker's performance as a novelist with writer's block in the 2014 film About Alex as one of the more real performances in the film despite the "wrote" feel to the emotional developments. Mike D'Angelo of The A.V. Club also found the crises and conflicts that Parker's character was involved in to be petty. Parker's independent short film #AmeriCan was nominated in the Outstanding Independent Short category at the Black Reel Awards of 2015 and won.

That same year, Parker reunited with Prince-Blythewood, playing the male lead in her film Beyond the Lights. He was nominated for a 2015 Black Reel Award for Best Actor and an Image Award for Outstanding Actor in a Motion Picture. In Parker's role as a police officer moonlighting as a bodyguard, his onscreen chemistry with co-star Gugu Mbatha-Raw was praised by Dana Stevens of Slate. Stevens noted Parker was destined for more substantive performances. The story was hailed as a well-written believable romance with depth by many critics such as Travers and Ebiri, earning an 82% approval rating at Rotten Tomatoes.

In the airplane terrorism mystery film Non-Stop, Parker plays a computer programmer. Kenneth Turan of the Los Angeles Times notes that Parker's talents are well-employed in his supporting role. In Every Secret Thing, Richard Roeper of the Chicago Sun-Times found Parker and his detective partner Elizabeth Banks to have been overwhelmed in their roles. Travers also found the detectivework to be uncompelling. Frank Scheck of The Hollywood Reporter found Parker's performance to have had its moments.

Parker played the role of Slim in the 2015 survival film, Eden. The film was directed by Shyam Madiraju, co-produced by Parker, Jaume Collet-Serra and Shyam Madiraju, and stars Ethan Peck, Jessica Lowndes, Diego Boneta, James Remar and Sung Kang.

=== Directing ===
In 2012, Parker directed a short film called #AmeriCAN, which featured La La Anthony and is a thought piece about growing up as a young black person in a racially divided America.

For over seven years, Parker worked on making a film based on the life of Nat Turner. In 2014, he announced that he had funding and was working on assembling his team, and that the film would be called The Birth of a Nation, in a reappropriation of the 1915 D. W. Griffith film The Birth of a Nation, which is widely regarded as extremely racist. In addition to writing and directing, Parker cast himself as Turner. Aja Naomi King, Armie Hammer and Gabrielle Union were also cast in key roles.

The Birth of a Nation attracted attention due to rumored Oscar nominations. Because the film depicts a brutal rape, the 1999 rape allegations against Parker received significant press coverage. Fox Searchlight Pictures, the studio releasing the film, went into damage control mode. Union, a rape victim and one of the main stars of The Birth of a Nation, wrote in the Los Angeles Times, "As important and ground-breaking as this film is, I cannot take these allegations lightly." Parker chose to deflect questions about his past legal problems while doing press for The Birth of a Nation at the Toronto Film Festival. Shortly thereafter, Parker and his handlers chose to cut press interviews short when questions came up about his involvement with the alleged rape and its impact on the marketing of the film.

The sister of Parker's alleged victim said the invention of a rape scene and Parker playing the avenging hero caused her and her family immense pain. To try to defuse the public backlash, Bron Studios hired The Glover Park Group and Don McPherson to give Parker media training and public relations advice. In an October 2016 60 Minutes interview, Parker maintained that he was innocent of the crime and that he did not feel guilty about it, but conceded that, from the perspective of a 36-year-old man, he had done something morally wrong.

In evaluating the impact of the public's reaction to Parker's alleged 1999 rape of a fellow Penn State student, industry insiders said that, unlike Roman Polanski and Woody Allen, both accused of sexual assault, Parker was just beginning his directing career and had not "built up an acclaimed body of work that might encourage some to say they are willing to separate the artist from the art."

In August 2016, Parker was honored with the Sundance Institute's Vanguard Award. In 2019, he wrote, directed, and starred in the film American Skin, which had its world premiere at the Venice Film Festival in August 2019. Following its release, American Skin has received $4 million over a fortnight and finished in the top 10 on FandangoNow, Google Play, and Spectrum's PVOD rental charts. Becoming one of the highest grossing titles for its distributor, Vertical Entertainment on PVOD. The Venice Film Festival’s Sconfini Section awarded the prize of "Best Film" to American Skin on September 7, 2019, the first film addressing the racial injustice theme to have won in the category.

Parker directed 10 episodes of Baselines, a web series about a family based in Los Angeles intent on protecting their son, Jamiel Chambers, and his basketball dreams from the dangers of inner-city American life.

Parker's next film Newborn, will be released on April 10, 2026 and distributed by AMC Theatres. Filmed in 2020, the film is a drama written, directed, and produced by Parker and stars David Oyelowo, Barry Pepper and Jimmie Fails.

=== Public charity ===
Parker sponsors scholarships for youth at East Texas Wiley College through the 100 Men of Excellence Initiative. Wiley opened a film school named The Nate Parker School of Film and Drama.

Parker has been a supporter of Boys & Girls Clubs of America as well as a program called Peace4Kids, which is a program for foster youths and underprivileged youth in South Los Angeles, California where kids are involved in daily activities that stimulate and nurture creativity and intellect. Parker has coached a wrestling team of 10-, 11- and 12-year-olds at Rosemead High School and has assisted in coaching wrestling at Rio Hondo College. Inspired by his experience with The Great Debaters, Parker began working with a Brooklyn initiative called Leadership and Literacy through Debate.

The Nate Parker Foundation was founded in 2015 and is based in Brooklyn, New York. In 2016, the foundation established the Nate Parker Summer Film Institute at Wiley College which was held yearly to use film as a medium of social transformation with 31 students who are either from Africa or of African descent. The foundation received the first grant to make the HBCU Storytellers Project by the Kellogg Foundation’s Racial Healing and Reconciliation Fund in 2017. The grant covered four short documentaries which address racial issues and stereotypes. The first film series funded by the grant, Just Mercy, received four NAACP Image awards, Outstanding Ensemble Cast, Outstanding Supporting Actor, Outstanding Actor in a Motion Picture, and Outstanding Motion Picture. In 2018, the foundation received funding from the Ford Foundation and private stakeholders.

== Personal life ==
In August 2007, Parker married Sarah DiSanto, a native of Erie, Pennsylvania, whom he met while they were attending Penn State. They were married in Erie's Frontier Park. The couple has three daughters in addition to two more daughters Parker had from previous relationships.

Parker has said that he considers himself a Christian, and that he grew up in the church.

According to a DNA analysis, some of Parker's ancestry is from the Tikar people of modern-day Cameroon.

=== Rape allegation and acquittal ===
In 1999, while a sophomore at Penn State University, Parker and his roommate and wrestling teammate, Jean McGianni Celestin, cowriters on The Birth of a Nation (2016) together, were accused of raping a fellow student. She accused Parker and Celestin of having raped her while she was intoxicated and unconscious and stated that she was unsure of how many people had been involved. She also stated that the two harassed her after she pressed charges and that they hired a private investigator who showed her picture around campus, revealing her identity, which Parker and Celestin denied. Parker and Celestin were charged with rape soon after the incident. Parker was acquitted but Celestin was initially convicted of sexual assault and received a six-month to one-year prison sentence in 2001, later raised to two to four years per state sentencing guidelines. His conviction was later overturned on appeal.

The accuser dropped out of Penn State the following year, in 2000. She later filed a complaint against the university for failing to protect her from harassment, which was settled with Penn State for $17,500 in 2002.

Parker was initially suspended from Penn State's wrestling team, before being reinstated in 2000 while facing trial. Within weeks, a female student worker accused him of exposing himself to her. The student did not go to the police and Penn State dropped the matter. After the trial, Parker transferred to and graduated from the University of Oklahoma in 2002, where he was on the wrestling team and received a degree in management science and information systems.

In 2012, the 1999 rape accuser died by suicide.

== Filmography ==
=== Film ===
Year	Title	Role	Notes
2005	Dirty	Duster	
2005	Cruel World	Techno	
2007	Pride	Hakim	
2007	The Great Debaters	Henry Lowe	
2008	Felon	Officer Collins	
2008	Tunnel Rats	Private Jim Lidford	
2008	Rome & Jewel	Rome	
2008	The Secret Life of Bees	Neil	
2010	Blood Done Sign My Name	Ben Chavis	
2012	Red Tails	Capt. Martin "Easy" Julian	
2012	Arbitrage	Jimmy Grant	
2012	Red Hook Summer	Box	
2013	Ain't Them Bodies Saints	Sweeter	
2014	Non-Stop	Zack White	
2014	About Alex	Ben	
2014	Every Secret Thing	Kevin Jones	
2014	Beyond the Lights	Kaz Nicol	
2015	Eden	Slim	
2016	The Birth of a Nation	Nat Turner	Also director, writer and producer
2019	American Skin	Lincoln Johnson	Also director and writer
2026	Newborn	—N/a	Post-production; director, writer, producer. Filmed in 2020.

=== Television ===
Year	Title	Role	Notes
2004	Cold Case	R. J. Holden	Season 1, episode 22: "The Plan"
2005	Kurtlar vadisi	Male Model	Season 4, episodes 96 and 97
2006	The Unit	Darryl	Season 2, episode 11: "Silver Star"

== Awards and nominations ==
Year	Award	Category	Work	Result	Refs.
2008	NAACP Image Award	Outstanding Supporting Actor in a Motion Picture	The Great Debaters	Nominated	
2009	NAACP Image Award	Outstanding Supporting Actor in a Motion Picture	The Secret Life of Bees	Nominated	
2012	African-American Film Critics Association	Best Supporting Actor	Arbitrage	Won	
2012	Hamptons International Film Festival	Breakthrough Performer	Arbitrage	Won	
2013	Black Reel Awards	Best Supporting Actor	Arbitrage	Nominated	
2013	Black Reel Awards	Outstanding Actor	Red Tails	Nominated	
2013	168 Film Festival	Best Actor	Lu	Won	
2014	Black Reel Awards	Best Supporting Actor	Ain't Them Bodies Saints	Nominated	
2015	NAACP Image Award	Outstanding Actor in a Motion Picture	Beyond the Lights	Nominated	
2015	Black Reel Awards	Outstanding Actor	Beyond the Lights	Nominated	
2015	Black Reel Awards	Best Independent Short	#AmeriCan	Won	
2016	Sundance Film Festival	Grand Jury Prize: Dramatic	The Birth of a Nation	Won	
2016	Sundance Film Festival	Audience Award: Dramatic	The Birth of a Nation	Won	
2016	CinemaCon	Breakthrough Director of the Year	The Birth of a Nation	Won	

== Published works ==
Nate Parker is the author of the book Birth of a Nation: Nat Turner and the Making of a Movement in which he writes about the resistance against oppression. The first half of his book is about Nat Turner's slave rebellion in the 19th century, and the other half explores the historical context of his rebellion and how it is relevant to modern events and discourse. The book was later adapted into a motion picture, The Birth of a Nation, which was also the directorial debut of Parker.
