= Timothy Tyson =

American historian

- Born: 1959 (age 66–67); Raleigh, North Carolina, U.S.
- Education: University of North Carolina at Greensboro; Emory University (B.A.); Duke University (PhD)
- Occupations: Historian; author

Timothy B. Tyson (born 1959) is an American writer and historian who specializes in the issues of culture, religion, and race associated with the Civil Rights Movement. He is a senior research scholar at the Center for Documentary Studies at Duke University and an adjunct professor of American Studies at the University of North Carolina.

His books have won the Frederick Jackson Turner Award, the James A. Rawley Prize (OAH), the University of Louisville Grawemeyer Award in Religion, and the Southern Book Award. In addition, two of his books, Radio Free Dixie: Robert F. Williams and the Roots of Black Power (1998) and Blood Done Sign My Name (2004), have been adapted into films, and the latter was also adapted into a play.

In 2017, Tyson published The Blood of Emmett Till, which won the Robert F. Kennedy Book Award and was longlisted for the National Book Award, but which was later subject to controversy regarding a reported confession made by Till's accuser Carolyn Bryant to Tyson which could not be substantiated.

== Early life and education ==
Tyson was born in Raleigh, North Carolina. His parents are Vernon Tyson, a Methodist minister, and Martha Tyson, a school teacher. In his youth, the family was living in Oxford, North Carolina, in 1970, when Henry Marrow, a 23-year-old black veteran, was killed by three white men. The suspects were acquitted by an all-white jury. Blacks organized a boycott of white businesses in the mostly segregated town, and achieved integration after 18 months. Tyson's father was driven out of his church because of his support of the civil rights movement.

Tyson attended the University of North Carolina at Greensboro and graduated with a Bachelor of Arts degree from Emory University in 1987. He received his PhD in history from Duke University in 1994.

== Career ==
=== Teaching ===
Tyson began his teaching career at Duke University in 1994, while finishing his doctorate. During that time, he was named Research Fellow at Duke's Center for Ethical Studies for his work, "Dynamite: A Story from the Second Reconstruction in South Carolina", which was later included in the collection Jumpin' Jim Crow: The New Southern Political History, published by Princeton University Press in 2000. He became assistant professor of Afro-American Studies at the University of Wisconsin–Madison in 1994. In 2004–05, Tyson was the John Hope Franklin Senior Fellow at the National Humanities Center. In 2006, he was awarded the Grawemeyer Award in Religion by the Louisville Presbyterian Theological Seminary.

Tyson currently serves as Senior Research Scholar at Duke University's Center for Documentary Studies, with secondary appointments at the Duke Divinity School and the Department of History. At the Divinity School, Tyson teaches about race, religion and civil rights in the South. He also has a position in the Department of American Studies at the University of North Carolina at Chapel Hill.

In 2007, Tyson taught an experimental course entitled "The South in Black and White", which met at the Hayti Heritage Center in downtown Durham, for students at Duke, North Carolina Central University, and the University of North Carolina at Chapel Hill. In the fall of 2008, Tyson and Mary D. Williams, a leading gospel singer, led a community-based course in Wilmington, called "Wilmington in Black and White." Meeting at the historic Williston School, participants explored the ways that Southern history and culture can illuminate efforts at racial reconciliation and healing in one community.

Tyson serves on the executive board of the North Carolina NAACP and the UNC Center for Civil Rights.

=== Books ===
==== Democracy Betrayed: The Wilmington Race Riot of 1898 and Its Legacy ====
Tyson's first book, Democracy Betrayed: The Wilmington Race Riot of 1898 and Its Legacy (1998), was co-edited with David S. Cecelski. Its publication marked the centennial of the 1898 Wilmington massacre. It won the Outstanding Book Award from the Gustavus Myers Center for the Study of Bigotry and Human Rights in North America.

In 2006, Tyson wrote a 16-page article on the events in Wilmington for the Charlotte Observer and the Raleigh News and Observer. Soon afterward, the North Carolina General Assembly passed legislation to require the teaching in public schools of the white supremacy campaigns and the Wilmington massacre of 1898. "Ghosts of 1898" won an Excellence Award from the National Association of Black Journalists.

==== Radio Free Dixie: Robert F. Williams and the Roots of Black Power ====
In 1998, Tyson published an article, "Robert F. Williams, 'Black Power,' and the Roots of the Black Freedom Struggle", in the Journal of American History about civil rights leader Robert F. Williams's Radio Free Dixie program. The following year, he published the book Radio Free Dixie: Robert F. Williams and the Roots of Black Power. It won the Frederick Jackson Turner Prize for best first book in U.S. history from the Organization of American Historians, as well as the James A. Rawley Prize (OAH) for best book on the subject of race.

Sandra Dickson and Churchill Roberts adapted the material as Negroes with Guns: Rob Williams and Black Power, a documentary film produced by the University of Florida's Documentary Institute. It was premiered on PBS in February 2007. Negroes with Guns, for which Tyson served as lead consultant, won the Erick Barnouw Award for best historical film from the Organization of American Historians.

==== Blood Done Sign My Name ====
Tyson authored Blood Done Sign My Name, published by Crown in 2004, a memoir and history of the killing by whites of Henry Marrow, a black Army veteran, in Oxford, North Carolina in 1970. The book explores the reaction in the African-American community to the acquittal of the suspects by the all-white jury. Tyson drew from research that he did in the 1990s while he completed his master's thesis. Blood Done Sign My Name won the 2005 Southern Book Award and was a finalist for the National Book Critics Circle Award. The book was adapted into a movie written and directed by Jeb Stuart (writer) and released in 2010.

The book has been accused of having a number of factual inaccuracies.

==== The Blood of Emmett Till ====
Published in 2017, The Blood of Emmett Till reexamines the lynching of Emmett Till in 1955. The book was a New York Times bestseller, won the 2018 Robert F. Kennedy Book Award and was longlisted for the National Book Award. In the book, Tyson alleges that Carolyn Bryant had recanted her original testimony in a recorded conversation she had with Tyson, but a subsequent investigation did not corroborate this after the recording provided to investigators did not support this assertion. Tyson provided multiple explanations for why the comment was not recorded, including that the recorder was not working while Bryant made the comment, that the recording was lost, or that the tape recorder was not on. Tyson said that the comment was made in a conversation he had with Bryant in July 2008, but according to archived emails from August 2008, Tyson had not yet met Bryant by that time, which Tyson has not provided an explanation for.

== Wake County School Board protest ==
Tyson was arrested on June 15, 2010, by Raleigh police on charges of second-degree trespassing. He, along with Rev. William Barber, the President of the North Carolina Chapter of the NAACP, and two others protested the Wake County school's decision to change its diversity policy, based on busing students to diversify the racial make-up of its schools. The school board adopted a community school system, allowing students to attend schools close to where they live. Tyson argued that this would will lead to de facto segregation because of residential patterns.

== Publications ==
- Democracy Betrayed: The Wilmington Race Riot of 1898 and Its Legacy. Chapel Hill: University of North Carolina Press. 1998. ISBN 9780807847558. (co-editor with David S. Cecelski)
- Radio Free Dixie: Robert F. Williams and the Roots of Black Power. Chapel Hill: University of North Carolina Press. 1999. ISBN 0807849235.
- Blood Done Sign My Name: A True Story. New York: Three Rivers Press. 2004. ISBN 1400083117.
- The Blood of Emmett Till. New York: Simon & Schuster. 2017. ISBN 978-1476714851.
