= Blood Done Sign My Name (film) =

- Directed by: Jeb Stuart
- Written by: Jeb Stuart
- Based on: Blood Done Sign My Name by Timothy Tyson
- Produced by: Mel Efros; David Martin; Jeb Stuart; Mari Stuart
- Starring: Ricky Schroder; Omar Benson Miller; Michael Rooker; Nate Parker
- Cinematography: Steve Mason
- Edited by: Toby Yates
- Music by: John Leftwich
- Production company: Real Folk Productions
- Distributed by: Paladin
- Release date: February 19, 2010
- Running time: 128 minutes
- Country: United States
- Language: English

Blood Done Sign My Name is a 2010 American drama film written and directed by Jeb Stuart and starring Ricky Schroder, Omar Benson Miller, Michael Rooker, and Nate Parker. It is based on the autobiographical book Blood Done Sign My Name (2004) by historian Timothy Tyson.

== Plot ==
In Oxford, North Carolina, the county seat of a tobacco district, a black Vietnam-era veteran is beaten in 1970 by three white men, and shot dead by one of them. An all-white jury acquits the two defendants who were indicted.

The plot focuses on two characters: a local African-American high-school teacher, who recently returned to the town from college and organizes the black community to march to the state capital to protest the unjust verdict, and a white minister, who loses much of his congregation because of his racially-liberal views during the Civil Rights Era.

== Cast ==
- Michael Rooker as Defense attorney Billy Watkins
- Gattlin Griffith as Tim Tyson
- Lee Norris as Roger Oakley
- Susan Walters as Martha Tyson
- Omar Benson Miller as Herman Cozart
- Ricky Schroder as Vernon Tyson
- Nick Searcy as Robert Teel
- Emily Alyn Lind as Julie Tyson
- Lela Rochon as Roseanna Allen
- Darrin Dewitt Henson as Eddie McCoy
- Nate Parker as Ben Chavis
- Markice Moore as Moses
- Sandra Ellis Lafferty as Grandma Jessie
- Rhoda Griffis as Isabel Taylor
- Michael May as Gerald Teel

== Reception ==
On review aggregator website Rotten Tomatoes, the film holds an approval rating of 52% based on 29 reviews, and an average rating of 5.8/10. The website's critical consensus reads, "Even among civil rights movies, Blood Done Sign My Name is remarkably earnest, but its big heart can't cover for the bland acting and TV-style melodrama that blunts the movie's impact." On Metacritic, the film has a weighted average score of 49 out of 100, based on 16 critics, indicating "mixed or average reviews".

A. O. Scott of The New York Times admired the film's ambitions, but said that "Mr. Stuart's evident desire to respect the truth of the story in all its details leaves him without a clear, emphatic dramatic structure."

== See also ==
- Civil rights movement in popular culture
