= Jimmie Fails =

American actor

- Born: November 10, 1994 (age 31); San Francisco, California, U.S.
- Occupation: Actor
- Years active: 2017—present
- Notable work: The Last Black Man in San Francisco (2019)

Jimmie Fails (born November 10, 1994) is an American actor. His feature film debut was the title role in the semi-autobiographical movie The Last Black Man in San Francisco (2019).

== Life and career ==
Fails was born and raised in San Francisco. Until he was three years old he lived in a Victorian house that his grandfather, a Baptist preacher, had bought in the predominantly Black middle-class Fillmore district of San Francisco. After his grandfather died, the house was foreclosed on because his relatives could not afford the expense and he spent the remainder of his childhood in foster care and public housing. Only he and his father remained in the city; the rest of the relatives moved out. Fails attended Archbishop Riordan High School and later attended college but left after one year.

Growing up, Fails met Joe Talbot at the park that divided their neighborhoods. They soon became close friends and first began making short movies together during high school. Their short film Last Stop Livermore, made in collaboration with Joe's brother Nat, was a finalist in the Golden Gate Awards. Their second, official short American Paradise premiered at the 2017 Sundance Film Festival.

Talbot and Fails conceived of the film The Last Black Man in San Francisco as teenagers, and the pair eventually created a Kickstarter campaign in 2015 to fund it. Danny Glover, a San Francisco native, called Fails directly to express his interest in the film. The film is semi-autobiographical and tells the story of a fictionalized version of Fails, played by the actor, who attempts to reclaim a Victorian home built by his grandfather in a gentrified area of San Francisco. The film was Fails' first professional acting role. The Last Black Man in San Francisco received positive critical reception.

In 2019, Talbot and Fails formed a production company called Longshot Features.

== Personal life ==
Fails resides in San Francisco.

== Filmography ==
Year	Title	Role	Notes
2019	The Last Black Man in San Francisco	Himself	
2020	Pieces of a Woman	Max	
2024	Nickel Boys	Mr. Hill	
2025	Wish You Were Here	Seth	
2025	Borderline	Rhodes	
2026	Newborn	Keith Newborn	Post-production
