= Newborn (film) =

- Theatrical release poster
- Directed by: Nate Parker
- Written by: Nate Parker
- Produced by: Nate Parker; Aaron L. Gilbert; Kevin Turen; Christina Lee Storm
- Starring: David Oyelowo; Olivia Washington; Barry Pepper; Jimmie Fails
- Production companies: Bron Studios; Creative Wealth Media; Yoruba Saxon Productions
- Distributed by: AMC Theatres; Mansa Studios
- Release date: April 10, 2026
- Running time: 102 minutes
- Country: United States
- Language: English

Newborn is a 2026 American drama film written, directed, and produced by Nate Parker. It stars David Oyelowo, Olivia Washington, Barry Pepper and Jimmie Fails.

The film was theatrically released in the United States on April 10, 2026.

== Premise ==
Chris Newborn is set free after serving seven years of solitary confinement. As he tries to mend his bond with his wife and son, he is faced with the long-term psychological consequences of being isolated. His fragile hold on reality compels him to deal with his unresolved issues of trauma in a way that confuses his memories with hallucinations.

== Cast ==
- David Oyelowo as Chris Newborn
- Olivia Washington as Tara Benton
- Barry Pepper as Hersh
- Jimmie Fails as Keith Newborn
- Aiden Stoxx as Jake Benton
- Thomas Cadrot as Derek
- Alexander Davis as Bully
- Andres Soto as Server
- Matthew Mylrea as Local Patron
- Naomi Simpson as Annie
- Gerardo Barcala as Hazmet Man
- Kate Gajdosik as CNN News Anchor
- Julie Nolin as Reporter
- Yorkie Joaquin as Orderly
- Nigel Gentry as Prison Guard
- Mozhgan Dahmardnezhad as Kamal

== Production ==
In May 2020, it was announced David Oyelowo had joined the cast of the film Solitary, with Nate Parker directing and writing the film, and Bron Studios set to finance and produce the film. In September 2020, Olivia Washington, Barry Pepper, and Jimmie Fails joined the cast of the film.

Principal photography began in September 2020.

== Release ==
In February 2026, it was announced that AMC Theatres were collaborating with Mansa Studios, a joint venture between Oyelowo and Parker, to theatrically release the film, now retitled Newborn, in the United States on April 10, 2026.

== Reception ==
Robert Daniels of RogerEbert.com gave Newborn 1.5 out of 4 stars. He praised David Oyelowo's performance but criticized Nate Parker's handling of the material, arguing that the film favored sensational psychological thriller conventions over a grounded exploration of trauma and incarceration. Daniels wrote that the film "becomes caught in between two modes of storytelling: the weighty drama and the destabilizing thriller," concluding that it ultimately "becomes something worse in the process: dishonest." Lisa Kennedy of The New York Times praised the cast, writing that Parker's direction and the performances particularly Oyelowo's kept viewers "guessing, and caring, to the end," despite criticizing the screenplay for carrying too many thematic messages. Writing for the San Francisco Chronicle, Bob Strauss gave the film 2.5 out of 4 stars, commending the performances of Oyelowo and Aiden Stoxx while concluding that the film did not consistently balance its prison reform themes with its suspenseful narrative.

Lucky David of ReportNaija described Newborn as a drama film which has problems balancing its exploration of trauma and reintegration with the elements of a psychological thriller. Lucky praised David Oyelowo's performance, noting his portrayal of Chris Newborn's emotional uncertainty after years of isolation, but criticized the screenplay for shifting from a character-driven examination of solitary confinement into a more conventional thriller reliant on hallucinations and withheld information. Carla Hay of Culture Mix wrote that the film began as a compelling story about a wrongfully convicted man's adjustment to freedom but became repetitive through its reliance on hallucination sequences, concluding that it neglected its rehabilitation themes.
