= Omar Benson Miller =

American actor (born 1978)

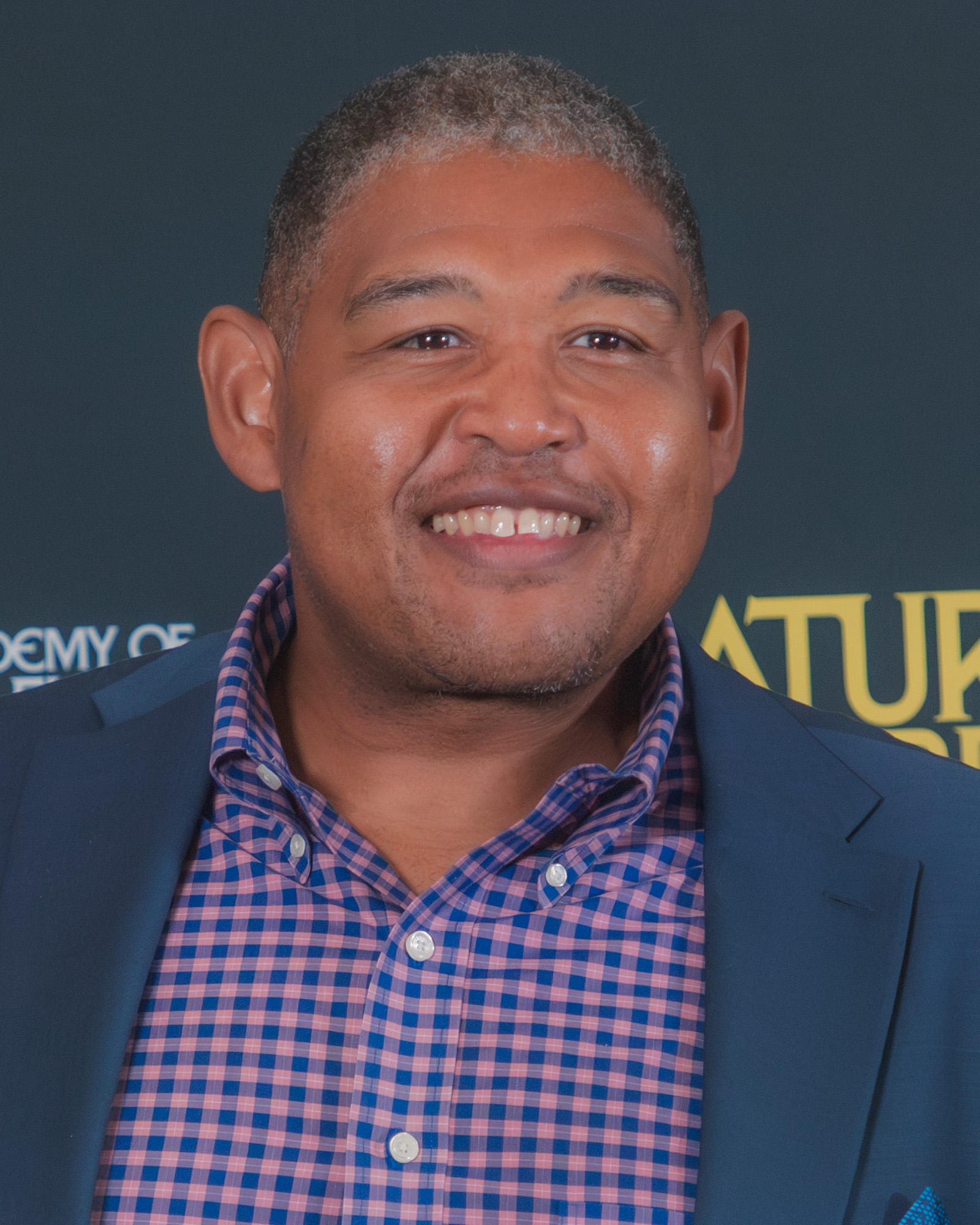
- Miller in 2026
- Born: October 7, 1978 (age 48); Anaheim, California, U.S.
- Education: San Jose State University
- Occupation: Actor
- Years active: 1999–present

Omar Benson Miller (born October 7, 1978) is an American actor. He is known for his work as Walter Simmons on CSI: Miami (2009–12), as Charles Greane on Ballers (2015–19), as the voice of Raphael on Rise of the Teenage Mutant Ninja Turtles (2018–20) and its 2022 film, the CBS comedy series The Unicorn (2019–21), and Cornbread in Sinners (2025).

== Early life ==
Miller was born in Anaheim, California, and graduated from San Jose State University.

== Career ==
Miller's biggest role was in the 2008 movie Miracle at St. Anna. He also has played minor roles in various television shows and movies, including Sex, Love & Secrets, American Pie Presents: Band Camp, Get Rich Or Die Tryin', 8 Mile, The Express: The Ernie Davis Story, Transformers, and Shall We Dance, as well as Obstacles (2000). He was a CSI: Miami regular. Starting on October 5, 2009, he appeared on the crime drama as Walter Simmons, a Louisiana native and art theft specialist.

== Filmography ==
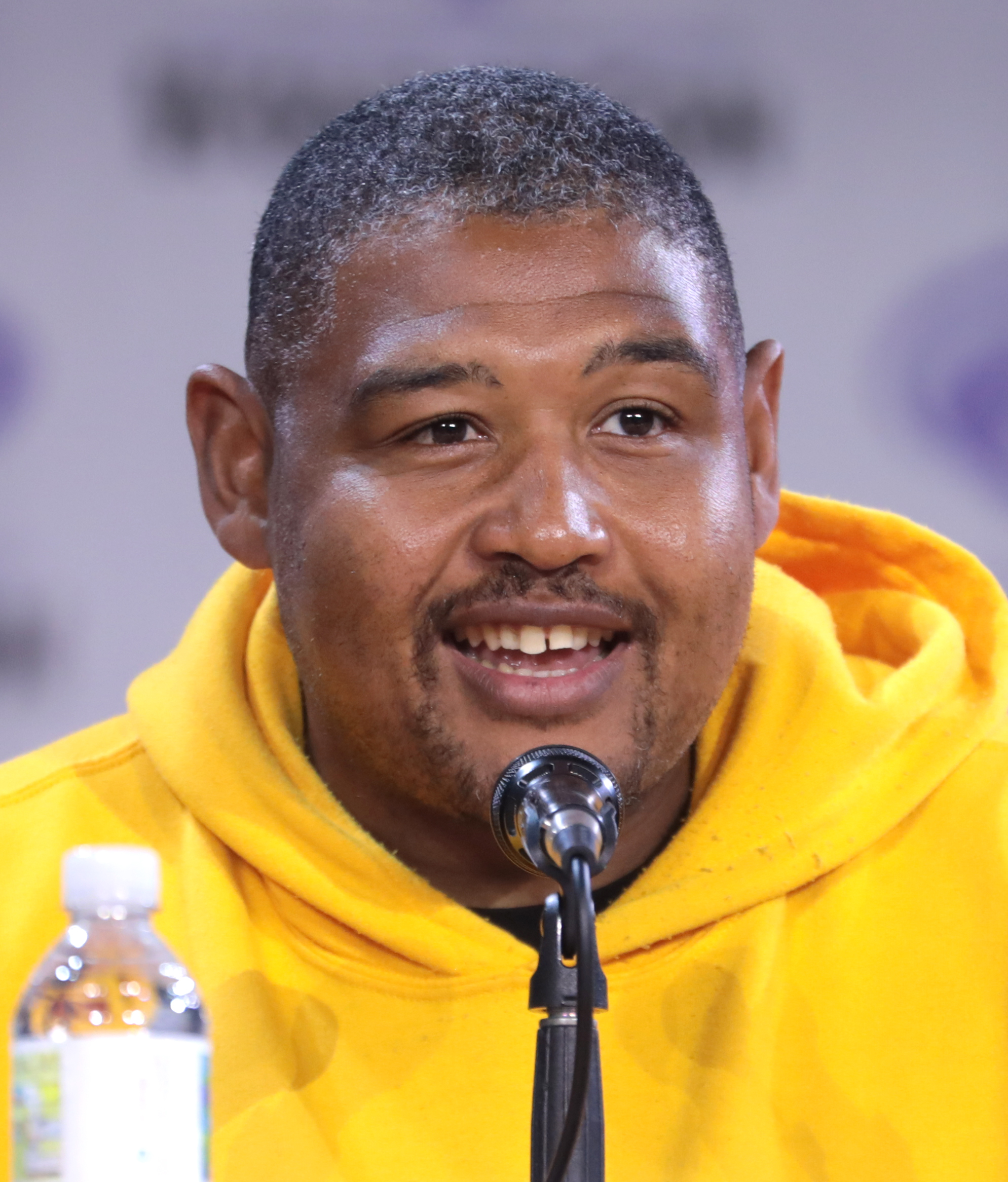
Miller at the 2023 WonderCon

=== Film ===
| Year | Title | Role | Notes |
|---|---|---|---|
| 2002 | Sorority Boys | Big Johnson | |
| 2002 | 8 Mile | Sol George | |
| 2004 | Shall We Dance? | Vern | |
| 2005 | American Pie Presents: Band Camp | Oscar | Direct-to-video |
| 2005 | Get Rich or Die Tryin' | Keryl | |
| 2007 | Lucky You | Card Grabber | |
| 2007 | Transformers | Glen's Cousin | |
| 2007 | Things We Lost in the Fire | Neal | |
| 2007 | Gordon Glass | Gordon Glass | |
| 2008 | Miracle at St. Anna | Private First Class Sam Train | |
| 2008 | The Express: The Ernie Davis Story | Jack Buckley | |
| 2010 | Blood Done Sign My Name | Herman Cozart | |
| 2010 | The Sorcerer's Apprentice | Bennet | |
| 2011 | The Lion of Judah | Horace (voice) | |
| 2013 | 1982 | T.K. Williams | |
| 2013 | Homefront | Teedo | |
| 2019 | Above Suspicion | Denver Rhodes | |
| 2022 | Lego Star Wars: Summer Vacation | Finn (voice) | |
| 2022 | Rise of the Teenage Mutant Ninja Turtles: The Movie | Raph, Office Workers (voice) | |
| 2024 | Naples to New York | George | |
| 2025 | Sinners | Cornbread | |

=== Television ===
| Year | Title | Role | Notes |
|---|---|---|---|
| 2002 | The West Wing | Orlando Kettles | 1 episode |
| 2003 | Undefeated | Mack | Television film |
| 2003 | Karen Sisco | Fuzzy Bear | 1 episode |
| 2004 | Making the Video | Himself | 1 episode |
| 2005 | Sex, Love & Secrets | Travis Cooper Jackson | Main role, 8 episodes |
| 2006 | Law & Order: Special Victims Unit | Rudi Bixton | 1 episode |
| 2009 | Eleventh Hour | Felix Lee | Main role, 5 episodes |
| 2009–12 | CSI: Miami | Walter Simmons | Main role, 63 episodes |
| 2014 | House of Lies | Slim Walters | 1 episode |
| 2015–19 | Ballers | Charles Greane | Main role, 47 episodes |
| 2018–20 | Rise of the Teenage Mutant Ninja Turtles | Raph (voice) | Main role, 57 episodes |
| 2019–21 | The Unicorn | Ben Taylor | Main role, 31 episodes |
| 2020 | The Lego Star Wars Holiday Special | Finn (voice) | Television film |
| 2021–23 | Rugrats | Randy Carmichael (voice) | Main role, 21 episodes |
| 2022 | The Last Days of Ptolemy Grey | Reggie Lloyd | Miniseries, 3 episodes |
| 2023 | True Lies | Albert "Gib" Gibson Jr. | Main role, 13 episodes |
| 2023 | I'm a Virgo | Damian Wallace | 1 episode |

=== Music videos ===
| Year | Artist | Song | Role |
|---|---|---|---|
| 2004 | Eminem | "Just Lose It" | Himself |

== Awards and nominations ==
| Award | Year | Category | Nominated work | Result | Ref. |
|---|---|---|---|---|---|
| Actor Awards | 2026 | Outstanding Performance by a Cast in a Motion Picture | Sinners | Won | |
