= Jeb Stuart (writer) =

American writer, film director and producer (born 1956)

- Born: January 21, 1956 (age 70); Little Rock, Arkansas, U.S.
- Education: University of North Carolina at Chapel Hill; Stanford University
- Occupations: Screenwriter film director film producer
- Years active: 1988–present
- Known for: Vikings: Valhalla; Die Hard; The Fugitive
- Spouse: Anne Bryant Stuart

Jeb Stuart (born January 21, 1956) is an American screenwriter, film director, and producer, known for writing blockbuster action films such as Die Hard (1988) and The Fugitive (1993), and creating the Netflix television series Vikings: Valhalla (2022–2024).

== Early life and education ==
Stuart grew up in Charlotte, North Carolina, and Gastonia, North Carolina, and graduated from Ashbrook High School. His father Dr. James Stuart was minister at First Presbyterian Church in Gastonia.

He received Bachelor's and master's degrees from the University of North Carolina at Chapel Hill, as well as a Masters of Arts in communications from Stanford University in Palo Alto, California.

He is a former member of the graduate faculty at Northwestern University in Evanston, Illinois, where he taught in the Writing for Stage and Screen Program.

== Career ==
Stuart's first screenplay was for the 1988 action film Die Hard, which was later revised by veteran screenwriter Steven E. de Souza. Adapted from the Roderick Thorp 1979 novel Nothing Lasts Forever, the film was a massive financial and critical success, spawning four sequels and being considered one of the greatest and most influential action films of all time.

He helped write the science-fiction horror film Leviathan (1988) and the Sylvester Stallone prison thriller Lock Up (1989).

Stuart was heavily involved in the writing of The Fugitive (1993), reworking David Twohy's original draft while on set and working with director Andrew Davis and stars Harrison Ford and Tommy Lee Jones.

He wrote an early draft of Indiana Jones and the Kingdom of the Crystal Skull, entitled Indiana Jones and the Saucer Men from Mars, in 1995.

In 1997, he made his directorial debut with Switchback, a thriller starring Dennis Quaid and Danny Glover. The film's negative critical reception led to Stuart semi-retiring from filmmaking for over a decade, before returning by writing, producing, and directing Blood Done Sign My Name (2010), adapted from the autobiography of author and historian Timothy Tyson.

He is the creator of Netflix's Vikings: Valhalla, a historical fiction drama television series and a sequel to History's Vikings. This spin-off series starts a century after the original series and tells the tales of some of the best known Northmen in history: Leif Erikson, Freydis and Harald Hardrada.

=== Accolades ===
Stuart has been nominated for a Writers Guild of America Award for Best Adapted Screenplay as well as nominated twice for an Edgar Allan Poe Award for Best Motion Picture Screenplay.

He has received recognition for his writing from the American Film Institute and is a recipient of a Nicholl Fellowship in Screenwriting, administered by the Academy of Motion Picture Arts and Sciences, of which he has been a member for over 25 years.

== Personal life ==
He was married to his high school sweetheart Anne Bryant Stuart from March 1, 2001, until her death. They had two children, Alexandra "Lexi" Stuart and Baker Stuart.

== Filmography ==
=== Film ===
Year	Film	Writer	Producer	Director	Notes
1988	Die Hard	Yes	No	No	Co-written with Steven E. de Souza; Nominated for Edgar Allan Poe Award for Best Motion Picture
1989	Leviathan	Yes	No	No	Co-written with David Webb Peoples
1989	Next of Kin	No	Associate	No	
1989	Lock Up	Yes	No	No	Co-written with Richard Smith and Henry Rosenbaum
1990	Vital Signs	Yes	No	No	Co-written with Larry Ketron
1990	Another 48 Hrs.	Yes	No	No	Co-written with John Fasano and Larry Gross
1993	The Fugitive	Yes	No	No	Co-written with David Twohy; Nominated – Edgar Allan Poe Award for Best Motion Picture and WGA Award for Best Screenplay
1995	Just Cause	Yes	No	No	Co-written with Peter Stone
1997	Fire Down Below	Yes	Executive	No	Co-written with Philip Morton
1997	Switchback	Yes	Executive	Yes	
2010	Blood Done Sign My Name	Yes	Yes	Yes	
2026	Takeover	Yes	No	No	Co-written with Brandon M. Easton

Also uncredited wrote an earlier draft for Indiana Jones and the Kingdom of the Crystal Skull (2008).

=== Television ===
Year	Title	Writer	Executive Producer	Creator	Notes
2020	The Liberator	Yes	Yes	Yes	
2022–2024	Vikings: Valhalla	Yes	Yes	Yes	Also showrunner
2026	East of Eden	No	Yes	No	Also showrunner
TBA	Lonesome Dove †	Yes	Yes	TBA	Also showrunner

== Awards and nominations ==
=== Nominations ===
- 1988 Edgar Allan Poe Award for Best Motion Picture: Die Hard (with Steven E. de Souza)
- 1993 Edgar Allan Poe Award for Best Motion Picture: The Fugitive (with David Twohy)
- 1993 Writers Guild of America Award for Best Screenplay Based on Material Previously Produced or Published: The Fugitive (with David Twohy)

== See also ==
- List of American writers
- List of film and television directors
- List of film producers
- List of people from Arkansas
- List of people from North Carolina
