= Million Man March =

1995 demonstration by African-American men in Washington, D.C.

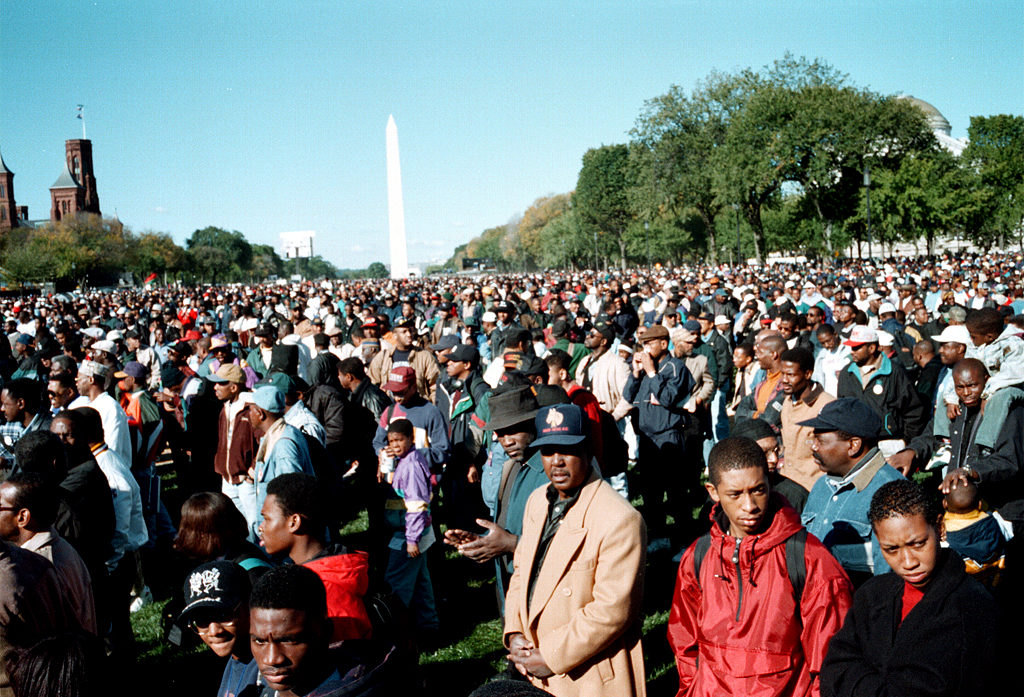
Attendees of the Million Man March

The Million Man March was a large gathering of African American men in Washington, D.C., on Monday, October 16, 1995. Called by Louis Farrakhan, it was held on and around the National Mall. The National African American Leadership Summit, a leading group of civil rights activists, and the Nation of Islam worked with scores of civil rights organizations, including the National Association for the Advancement of Colored People (NAACP, involving its local chapters, not headquarters), to form the Million Man March Organizing Committee. The founder of the National African American Leadership Summit, Benjamin Chavis Jr., served as National Director of the Million Man March.

The committee invited many prominent speakers to address the audience, and African-American men from across the United States converged in Washington to "convey to the world a vastly different picture of the Black male" and to unite in self-help and self-defense against economic and social ills plaguing the African-American community.

The march took place in the context of a larger grassroots movement that set out to win politicians' attention for urban and minority issues through widespread voter registration campaigns. On the same day, there was a parallel event called the Day of Absence, organized by women in conjunction with the March leadership, which was intended to engage the large population of Black Americans who would not be able to attend the demonstration in Washington. On this date, all Black Americans were encouraged to stay home from their usual school, work, and social engagements, in favor of attending teach-ins, and worship services, focusing on the struggle for a healthy and self-sufficient Black community. Further, organizers of the Day of Absence hoped to use the occasion to make great headway on their voter registration drive.

A conflict arose about crowd size estimates between March organizers and National Park Service officials. The National Park Service issued an estimate of about 400,000 attendees, a number significantly lower than march organizers had hoped for. After a heated exchange between leaders of the march and the NPS, ABC-TV-funded researchers at Boston University estimated the crowd size to be about 837,000 members, with a 20% margin of error.

Two years after the march, the Million Woman March was held in response to concerns that the Million Man March had focused on Black men to the exclusion of Black women.

== Economic and social factors ==
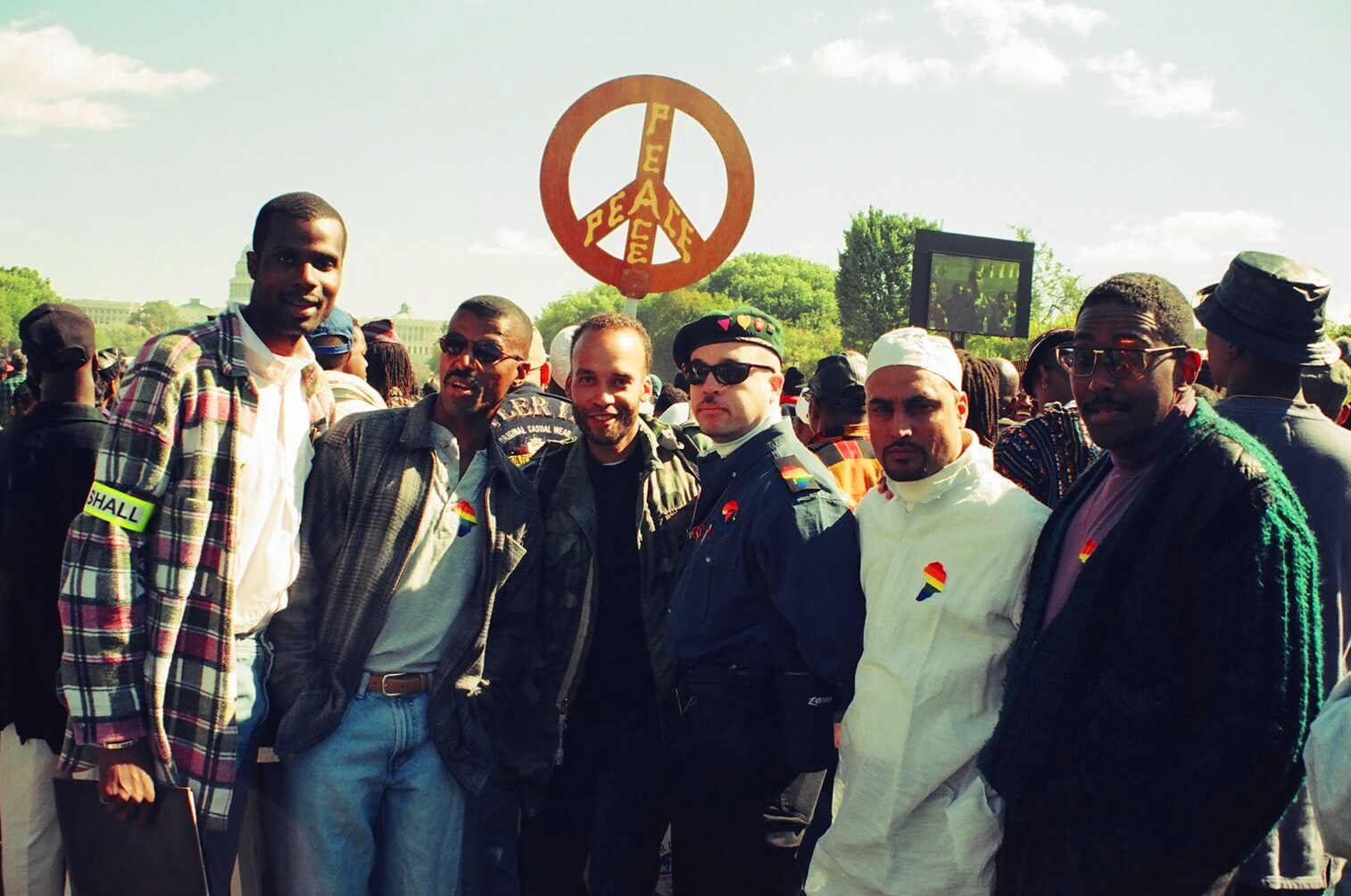
March attendees

One of the primary motivating factors for the march was to place black issues back on the nation's political agenda. In the aftermath of the Republican Party's victory in the 1994 Congressional election and the continued success of the party's campaign platform, the Contract with America, some African-American leaders believed that the social and economic issues facing the black community fell by the wayside of policy debates. March organizers believed that politicians were failing the black community by "papering over the most vital dimensions of the crisis in international capitalism" and blaming urban blacks for "domestic economic woes that threatened to produce record deficits, massive unemployment, and uncontrolled inflation".

At the time of the march, African Americans faced unemployment rates nearly twice that of white Americans, a poverty rate of more than 40%, and a median family income that was about 58% of the median for white households. More than 11% of all black men were unemployed and for those aged 16 to 19, the number of unemployed had climbed to over 50%. Further, according to Reverend Jesse Jackson's speech at the March, the United States House of Representatives had reduced funding to some of the programs that played an integral role in urban Americans' lives. He said, "The House of Representatives cut $1.1 billion from the nation's poorest public schools", and "cut $137 million from Head Start", effectively subtracting $5,000 from each classroom's budget and cutting 45,000 preschoolers from a crucial early education program.

Environmental hazards were also seen as making the lives of urban Black Americans unstable. Black men were murdered at a rate of 72 per 100,000, a rate significantly higher than the 9.3 per 100,000 attributed to white men. Some Black American activists blamed aggressive law enforcement and prison construction for leaving "two hundred thousand more Black Americans in the jail complex than in college" and creating devastating leadership gaps within black communities and families. Event organizers were infuriated by a perceived gap in prenatal care for Black women and children that was caused, in part, by the closing of inner-city hospitals.

Event organizers believed that urban Black Americans were born with "three strikes against them": insufficient prenatal care, inferior educational opportunities, and jobless parents. Instead of providing young children with the means to succeed, they believed the government instead intervened in the lives of its Black Americans through law enforcement and welfare programs that did little to improve the community's circumstances.

== Media portrayal ==
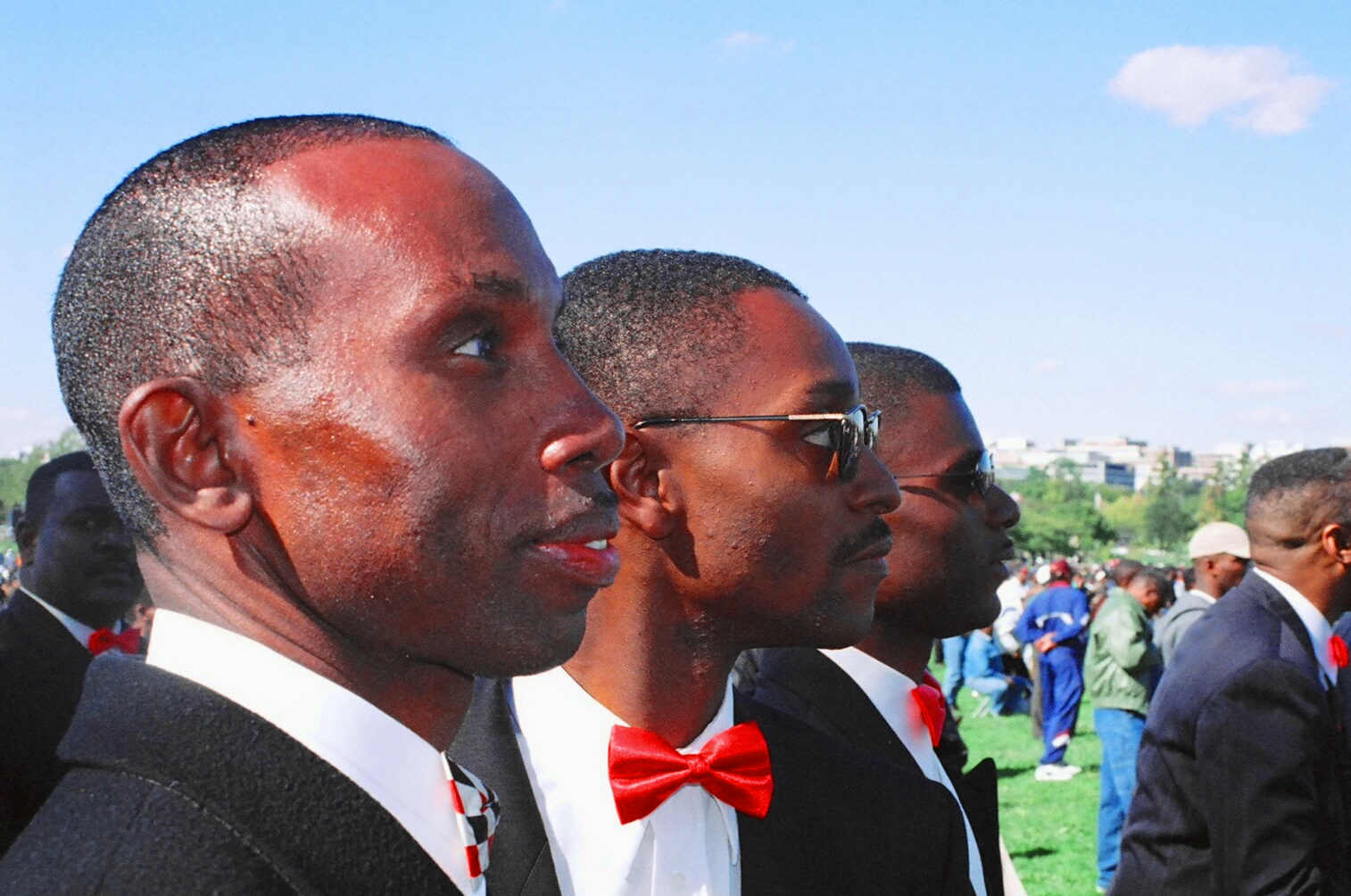
Members of the Nation of Islam at the march

In addition to their goal of fostering a spirit of support and self-sufficiency within the black community, organizers of the Million Man March sought to use the event as a publicity campaign aimed at combating the negative racial stereotypes in the American media and in popular culture. March organizers were dismayed by the sweeping stereotypes they thought white America seemed to draw from the coverage of such figures as Willie Horton, O. J. Simpson, and Mike Tyson.

Stating that "black men have been designated by the culture as the sacrificial lambs for male evil", event organizers asked the black men in attendance to make a public display of their commitment to responsible and constructive behavior that would give the mass media positive imagery to broadcast.

== Program ==
Although various organizations, charities, and vendors had booths and displays at the rally, the focal point of the day was the stage set up on the west front grounds of the United States Capitol building. The day's events were broken down into several sessions: Early Morning Glory (6 am–7:30am), Sankofa: Lessons from the Past Linkages to the Future (8 am–10:30 am), Affirmation/Responsibility (11 am–2 pm), and Atonement and Reconciliation (2:30 pm–4 pm).

=== I. Early Morning Glory ===
- Rev. H. Beecher Hicks of Washington, D.C. and Minister Rasul Muhammad – Masters of Ceremonies
- Sheik Ahmed Tijani Ben-Omar of Accra, Ghana and Rev. Frederick Haynes III from the Friendship-West Baptist Church, Dallas, Texas – adhan and invocation

=== II. Sankofa: Lessons from the past ===
- Rev. Wayne Gadie of the Emanuel Baptist Church, Malden, Massachusetts – Opening prayer
- Dancers and drummers from the village of Kankoura, Burkina Faso
- Greetings from the African Diaspora from the continent of Africa and the Caribbean
- Greetings from Black American leaders such as George Augustus Stallings, Oscar Easton (Blacks in Government), Henry Nichols (Hospital Workers Union), Dr. Na'im Akbar (Florida State University), Zachery McDaniels (National African American Leadership Summit)

=== III. Affirmation/Responsibility ===
- Rev. Willie F. Wilson of Union Temple Baptist Church, Washington, D.C., and Minister Ishmael Muhammad, of Mosque Maryam, Chicago, Illinois – Masters of ceremonies
- Rev. Al Sampson, Fernwood United Methodist Church (Chicago) – "A Declaration of Purpose"
- Boubacar Joseph Ndiaye, Chief Curator, Goree Island (Senegal) – "The African Diaspora"
- Congressman Donald M. Payne, Chair, Congressional Black Caucus – "The Congress"
- Former Congressman Gus Savage – "The Statesman"
- Kurt Schmoke, Mayor of Baltimore, Maryland – "The Cities"
- Marion Barry, Mayor of Washington, D.C. – "Mayor's Welcome and Official Statement"

==== Affirmation of Our Brothers ====
- Cora Masters Barry, First Lady, District of Columbia – Mistress of Ceremonies
- Dr. Betty Shabazz – remarks
- Martin Luther King III – remarks
- Tynnetta Muhammad – remarks

==== Mothers of the Struggle – Behold Thy Sons ====
- Faye Williams, attorney – Washington, D.C. coordinator Million Man March
- Rosa Parks
- Dorothy I. Height

=== IV. Atonement and Reconciliation ===
- Rev. Willie F. Wilson and Minister Ishmael Muhammad – Masters of Ceremonies
- Bishop H. H. Brookins of the 5th Episcopal District, AME in Los Angeles, California – the prayer for atonement
- Rev. James Bevel – the Theological Foundation for Atonement
- Dr. Cornel West – Statement of Atonement
- Rev. Joseph Lowery – Statement of Atonement
- Rev. Benjamin Chavis Jr., national coordinator of the Million Man March – the Healing of a People
- Minister Louis Farrakhan

== Structure of speeches ==
The organizers of the event took steps to lift the march from a purely political level to a spiritual one, hoping to inspire attendees and honored guests to move beyond "articulation of black grievances" to a state of spiritual healing. Speakers at the event structured their talks around three themes: atonement, reconciliation, and responsibility. The Day of Atonement became a second name for the event and for some came to represent the motivation of the Million Man movement. In the words of one man who was in attendance, Marchers aimed at "being at one with ourselves, the Most High, and our people".

Beyond the most basic call for atonement leaders of the March also called for reconciliation or a state of harmony between members of the black community and their God. Speakers called participants to "settle disputes, overcome conflicts, put aside grudges and hatreds" and unite in an effort to create a productive and supportive black community that fosters in each person the ability to "seek the good, find it, embrace it, and build on it." Finally, the leaders of the March challenged participants and their families at home to "expand [our] commitment to responsibility in personal conduct…and in obligations to the community".

=== Notable speakers ===
- Minister Louis Farrakhan – The Message and Vision (Key Note Speaker)
- Minister Rasul Muhammad and Minister Ishmael Muhammad – Master of Ceremonies
- Reverend Benjamin Chavis – National Director of Million Man March – Call to Purpose
- Martin Luther King III – Affirmation of our Brothers
- Rosa Parks – Mothers of the Struggle Behold Thy Sons
- Maya Angelou – Appeal to Our Brothers
- Reverend Jeremiah Wright – Prayer for Hope
- Dr. Maulana Karenga – Mission statement for the Million Man March/National Day of Absence
- Senator Adelbert Bryan – Senator, Virgin Islands
- Rev. James Bevel – The Theological Foundation for Atonement
- Reverend Jesse L. Jackson Sr. – Rainbow/PUSH Coalition
- Reverend Addis Daniel – The Light.

=== Day of Absence ===
While male leaders took primary responsibility for planning and participating in the events in Washington, female leaders organized a parallel activity called the National Day of Absence. In the spirit of unity and atonement, these leaders issued a call for all Black people not in attendance at the March to recognize October 16, 1995, as a sacred day meant for self-reflection and spiritual reconciliation. All Black Americans were encouraged to stay home from their work, school, athletic, entertainment activities and various other daily responsibilities on the Day of Absence.

Instead of partaking in their usual routines, participants were instructed to gather at places of worship and to hold teach-ins at their homes in order to meditate on the role and responsibility of blacks in America. Further, the day was intended to serve as an occasion for mass voter registration and contribution to the establishment of a Black Economic Development Fund.

== Crowd size ==
Because of the name of the event, the number of attendees was a primary measure of its success and estimating the crowd size, always a contentious issue reached new heights in bitterness. March organizers estimated the crowd size at between 1.5 to 2 million people but were incensed when the United States Park Police officially estimated the crowd size at 400,000. Farrakhan threatened to sue the National Park Service because of the low estimate from the Park Police.

Three days after the march, Farouk El-Baz, director of the Center for Remote Sensing at Boston University released a controversial estimate of 870,000 people with a margin of error of 25%, meaning that the crowd could have been as small as 655,000 or as large as 1.1 million. It later revised that figure to 837,000, with a 20% margin of error (669,600 to 1,004,400). The Park Service never retracted its estimate.

After the Million Man March, the Park Police ceased making official crowd size estimates. Roger G. Kennedy, the Director of the National Park Service, said that his agency planned to study the possibility of no longer counting crowds, noting that most organizations that sponsor large events complain that Park Service estimates are too low. When it prepared the 1997 appropriations bill for the United States Department of the Interior, the Committee on Appropriations of the United States House of Representatives stated in a June 1996 report that accompanied the bill that the Committee had not provided any funding for crowd counting activities associated with gatherings held on federal property in Washington, D.C. The report further stated that if event organizers wish to have crowd estimates, they should hire a private sector firm to conduct the count.

== Media reaction ==
Louis Farrakhan acquired unfavorable attention from African-American Christians and was compared to "Adolf Hitler" by the Jewish community for anti-Jewish rhetoric and views. His supporters said that Farrakhan was "against those Jews who have sacrificed their deep moral-religious heritage for a set of values grounded in capitalist exploitation and oppression." Newsweek observed that Farrakhan's apparent political agenda could become a concern for the Democratic Party, as his effort to register black men as independent voters could create a "voting bloc [with a] mix of social conservatism, economic 'empowerment' and black solidarity."

Richard Lacayo and Sam Allis wrote that Farrakhan may have organized the march to "simply prove that he was the man who could make it happen; he would then capitalize on the prominence he hoped it would confer."

=== Sexism ===
A group of black feminists including Angela Davis, Barbara Ransby, Evelynn Hammonds and Kimberlé Crenshaw formed an alliance called the African American Agenda 2000 to oppose the Million Man March. E. Frances White would recall in 2010 that the march had "frightened many black feminists because we felt that it would herald a dramatic resurgence in black male sexism."

Creating a separation in the movement became a topic of great controversy since it has been argued that, "Organizers excluded women from the march to send a two-part message" that men need to improve their character and women need to recognize their place "in the home."

In his 2005 book New Black Man, Mark Anthony Neal emphasizes the "small percentage of black women in attendance that day." Neal offers the perspective of Debra Dickerson, a woman writer who attended the march: "Dickerson noted the aura of politeness and chivalry she experienced walking...there was an element of performance taking place that day for international media, corporate America." The Million Man March that excluded black women was a "call for atonement [that] spoke to the need for those black men engaged in acts of criminality, violence, and blatant misogyny." However, black women faced backlash for exposing the March's flaws, such as "gender apartheid and nostalgia for patriarchy."

== 20th anniversary ==
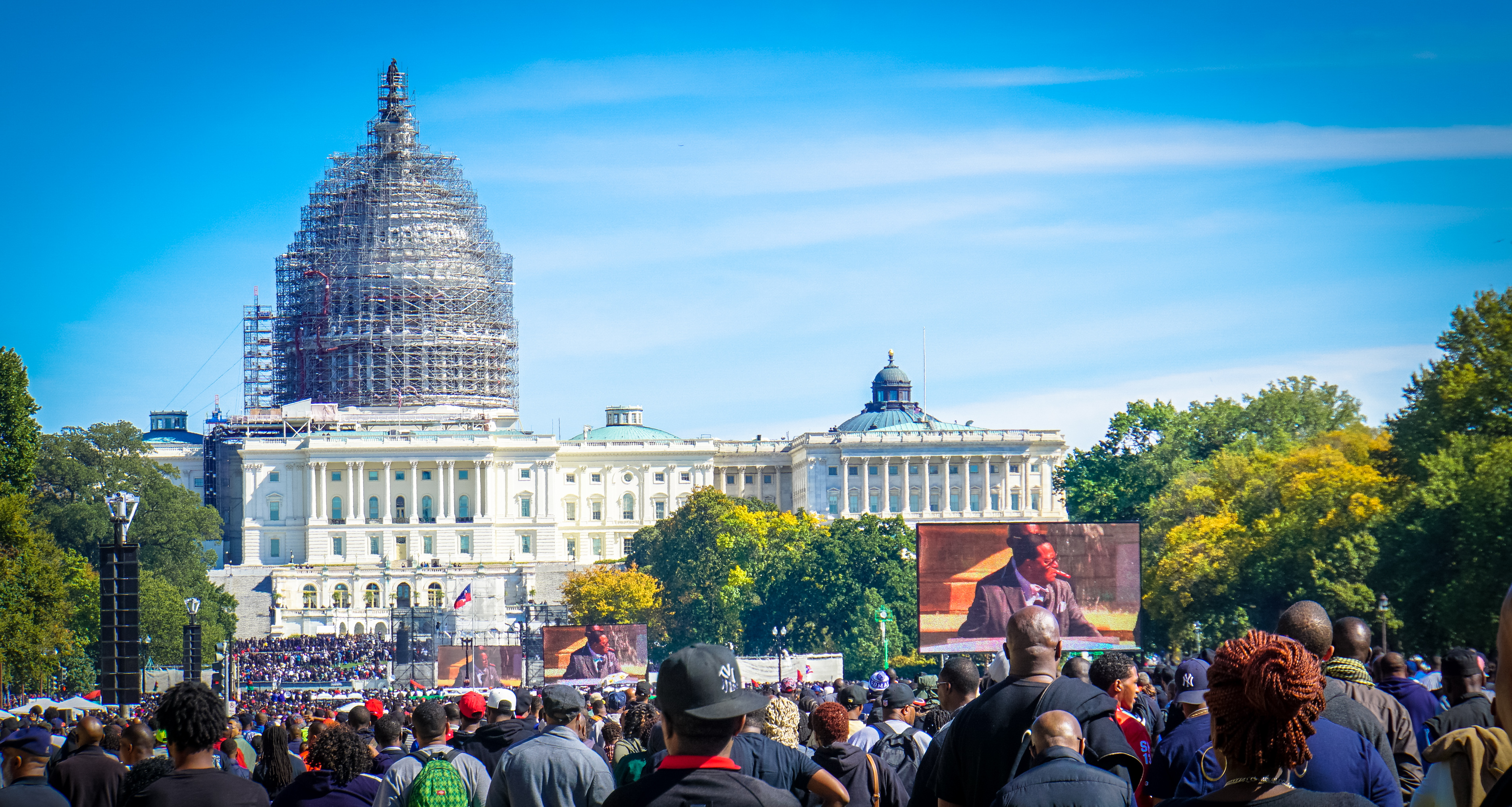
The 20th anniversary march

Farrakhan held the 20th Anniversary of the Million Man March: Justice or Else on October 10, 2015, in Washington, D.C.

The New York Times published an opinion piece by Charles M. Blow, who found it difficult to "separate the march from the messenger", and criticized Minister Farrakhan's speech, calling it homophobic and patriarchal. In an opinion piece for The Washington Post, Janell Ross called Farrakhan's speech "striking", a "stemwinder", and the "apex" of the event.

== Cultural impact ==
The 1996 motion picture Get on the Bus was released exactly one year to the day of this event, directed by Spike Lee as his first movie that he did not act in himself. The road-movie plot has a group of African Americans on the titular bus on the way to the Million Man March.

== See also ==
- Khalid Abdul Muhammad
- March on Washington
- Million Family March
- Million Woman March
- Millions More Movement
- Post-civil rights era African-American history

Non-African American related:

- List of largest peaceful gatherings
- Global Marijuana March, also known as the Million Marijuana March
- Million Mom March
- Million Muslim March
- Million People March
- Million Puppet March
- Million Worker March
