= Askia Muhammad =

American journalist and writer (1945–2022)

- Born: Charles K. Moreland; March 1945; Yazoo City, Mississippi, U.S.
- Died: February 17, 2022 (aged 76)
- Occupations: Journalist, photojournalist, radio producer, commentator, poet
- Employer(s): National Public Radio, The Final Call, Muhammad Speaks, Washington Informer
- Notable work: Behind Enemy Lines
- Awards: National Association of Black Journalists "Salute to Excellence" Awards

Askia Muhammad (March, 1945 – February 17, 2022) born Charles K. Moreland at Yazoo, Mississippi was an American poet, journalist, radio producer, commentator, and photojournalist. He was awarded multiple times by the National Association of Black Journalists for his work on National Public Radio, with first place "Salute to Excellence" awards for his commentaries on "Mississippi and My Memories" and "Mike Tyson: Check Yourself" and a third place "Salute to Excellence" award for "Ethel Payne Postage Stamp".

He served as the editor of Muhammad Speaks and as the head of the Washington office of The Final Call, the official newspapers of the Nation of Islam. He worked as a commentator for National Public Radio and a columnist for Washington Informer. He is the author of the book Behind Enemy Lines.

Muhammad died at his home on February 17, 2022, at the age of 76.
