= Post–civil rights era in African-American history =

In African-American history, the post–civil rights era is defined as the time period in the United States since the Congressional passage of the Civil Rights Act of 1964, the Voting Rights Act of 1965, and the Fair Housing Act of 1968, major federal legislation that ended legal segregation, gained federal oversight and enforcement of voter registration and electoral practices in states or areas with a history of discriminatory practices, and ended discrimination in the renting and buying of housing.

Politically, African Americans have made substantial strides in the post–civil rights movement era. Civil rights leader Jesse Jackson ran for the Democratic Party's presidential nomination in 1984 and 1988, attracting more African Americans into politics and unprecedented support and leverage for people of colour in politics. In 2008, Barack Obama was elected as the first President of the United States of African descent.

In the same period, African Americans have suffered disproportionate unemployment rates following industrial and corporate restructuring, with a rate of poverty in the 21st century that is equal to that in the 1960s. African Americans have the highest rates of incarceration of any minority group, especially in the southern states of the former Confederacy.

== 1965–1970 ==
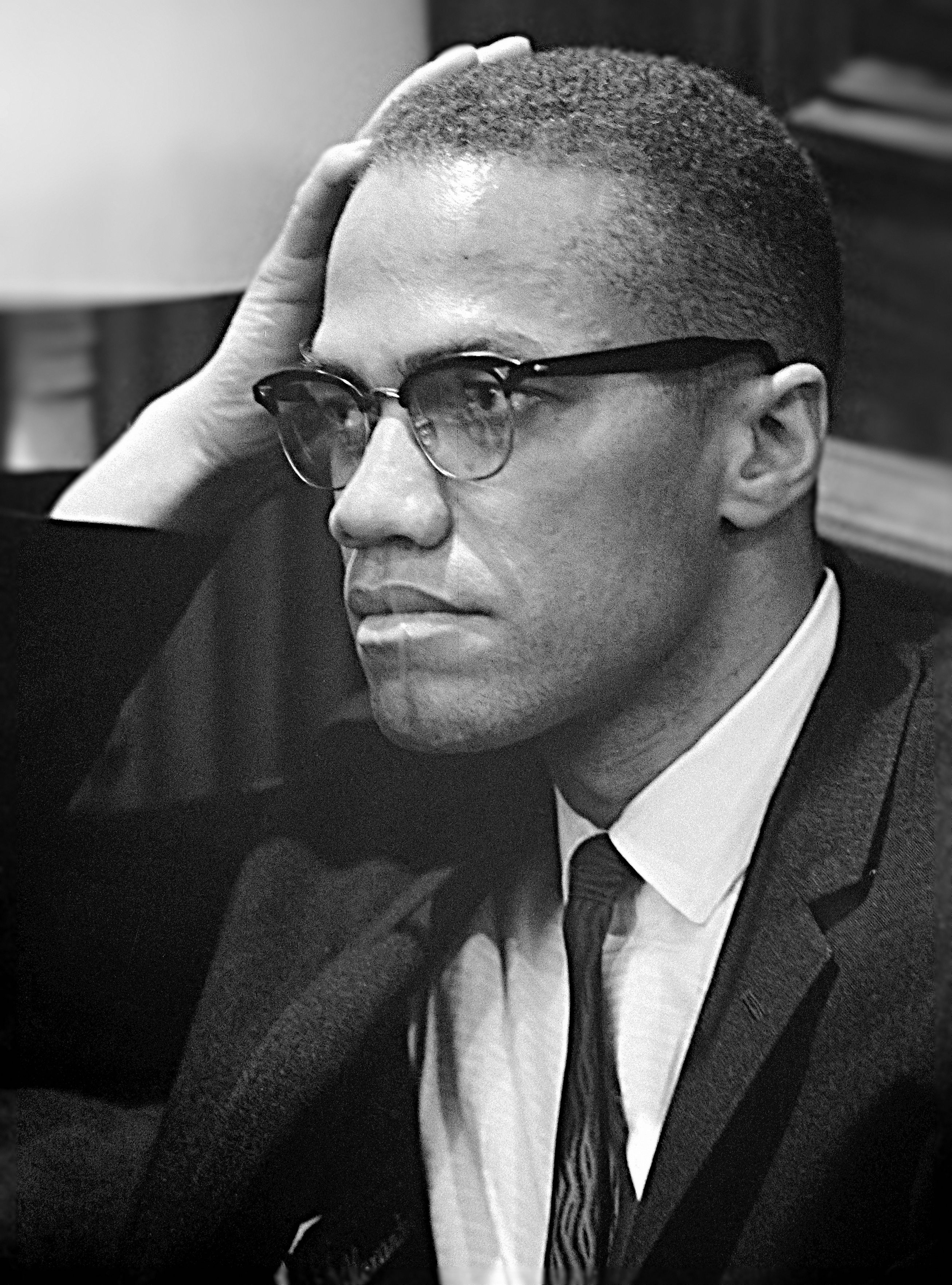
Malcolm X in March 1964.

On February 21, 1965, Malcolm X, an African-American rights activist with national and international prominence, was shot and killed in New York City.

1966 was the last year of publication of The Negro Motorist Green Book, informally known as "The Green Book". The book provided advice to African-American travelers, during years of legal segregation and overt discrimination, about places where they could stay, get gas, and eat while traveling cross-country. For example, in 1956 only three New Hampshire motels served African Americans, and most motels and hotels in the South discriminated by race. After the passage of the Civil Rights Act of 1964, the Green Book largely became obsolete.

In 1966–1967, the African-American cultural holiday Kwanzaa was first celebrated. Kwanzaa was founded by Maulana Karenga as a Pan-Africanist cultural and racial-identity event, as an alternative to cultural events of the dominant society such as Christmas and Hanukkah.

The April 1968 assassination of Martin Luther King Jr. led to protests and riots in multiple U.S. cities, primarily in Black-majority communities. Beginning in 1971, Martin Luther King Jr. Day was established as a holiday in numerous cities and states. A U.S. federal holiday was established in King's name in 1986. Since his death, hundreds of streets in the U.S. have been renamed in his honour. King has become a national icon in the history of American liberalism and American progressivism.

In May 1969, an armed standoff at two educational institutions in North Carolina between students and the National Guard left two people dead. Hundreds of students and soldiers were involved.

On June 13, 1969, the founder of the Five-Percent Nation, Clarence 13X, was shot dead in NYC. The Five-Percent Nation was originally a spin-off group from the Nation of Islam. The Five-Percent Nation has had a significant influence upon New York based hip-hop artists in the decades since its founding.

On December 4, 1969, Fred Hampton, a prominent Black Panther activist, was murdered by police while sleeping in Chicago.

== 1970s ==
On April 8, 1970, the nomination of G. Harrold Carswell to the U.S. Supreme Court was defeated by the U.S. Senate, in part because of his history of racist remarks and actions. On May 27, 1970, the film Watermelon Man was released, directed by Melvin Van Peebles and starring Godfrey Cambridge.

In 1971, the release of Sweet Sweetback's Baadasssss Song and Shaft marked the start of Blaxploitation films. The Blaxploitation genre centered around reductive tropes of stereotyped black male fantasies surrounding violence, sex, the drug trade, pimping and overcoming "The Man".

On April 20, 1971, the Supreme Court, in Swann v. Charlotte-Mecklenburg Board of Education, upheld busing of students to achieve integration. In June 1971, eight African-Americans were found shot dead in a house in Detroit, in the worst mass killing in Detroit's history. In December 1971, Jesse Jackson organized Operation PUSH in Chicago.

In 1972, Shirley Chisholm became the first major-party African-American candidate for President of the United States and the first woman to run for the Democratic presidential nomination. In 1976, Black History Month was founded by Professor Carter Woodson and the Association for the Study of Afro-American Life and History.

In 1972, DJ Kool Herc developed the musical blueprint for what later became hip-hop, later playing live shows for high school-age students in the Bronx, New York City.

In January 1973, gunmen stormed a house in Washington DC, and drowned four African-American children in bathtubs, and shot and killed two men and a boy. The house was occupied by members of the Hanafi Muslim sect, whose leader was in a dispute with the Nation of Islam. In 1977 the leader of the Hanafi sect led an armed takeover of 3 buildings in Washington DC, taking 149 hostages, to bring attention to the murder of his family. Two people were killed during the incident.

In the 1973 and 1974 MLB seasons, African-American baseball player Hank Aaron sought to pass Babe Ruth's career home-run record. Between 1973 and 1974, Aaron broke the world record for most mail received in one year with over 950,000 letters. Over one-third of those letters were hate mail letters for beating a white man's record, including death threats.

In June 1974, Martin Luther King's mother was assassinated. Alberta Williams King was shot dead at a church during a Sunday service.

Alex Haley published his novel Roots: The Saga of an American Family in 1976. It became a bestseller and generated great levels of interest in African-American genealogy and history. Roots was adapted into an eight part 1977 TV series that attracted a huge audience across the country.

President Jimmy Carter appointed Andrew Young to serve as Ambassador to the United Nations in 1977, the first African American to serve in the position. In Regents of the University of California v. Bakke (1978), the U.S. Supreme Court barred racial quota systems in college admissions but affirmed the constitutionality of affirmative action programs giving equal access to minorities.

On November 18, 1978, six hundred and forty eight African-Americans died in the mass murder/suicide of the Peoples Temple religious group in Jonestown, Guyana. The religious group, led by Jim Jones, had relocated from California to establish a community in Guyana, South America.

The Atlanta Child Murders which were committed between 1979 and 1981 set Atlanta's Black community on edge. At least 28 Black children and teenagers were abducted and murdered in similar circumstances in less than two years before their killer was caught.

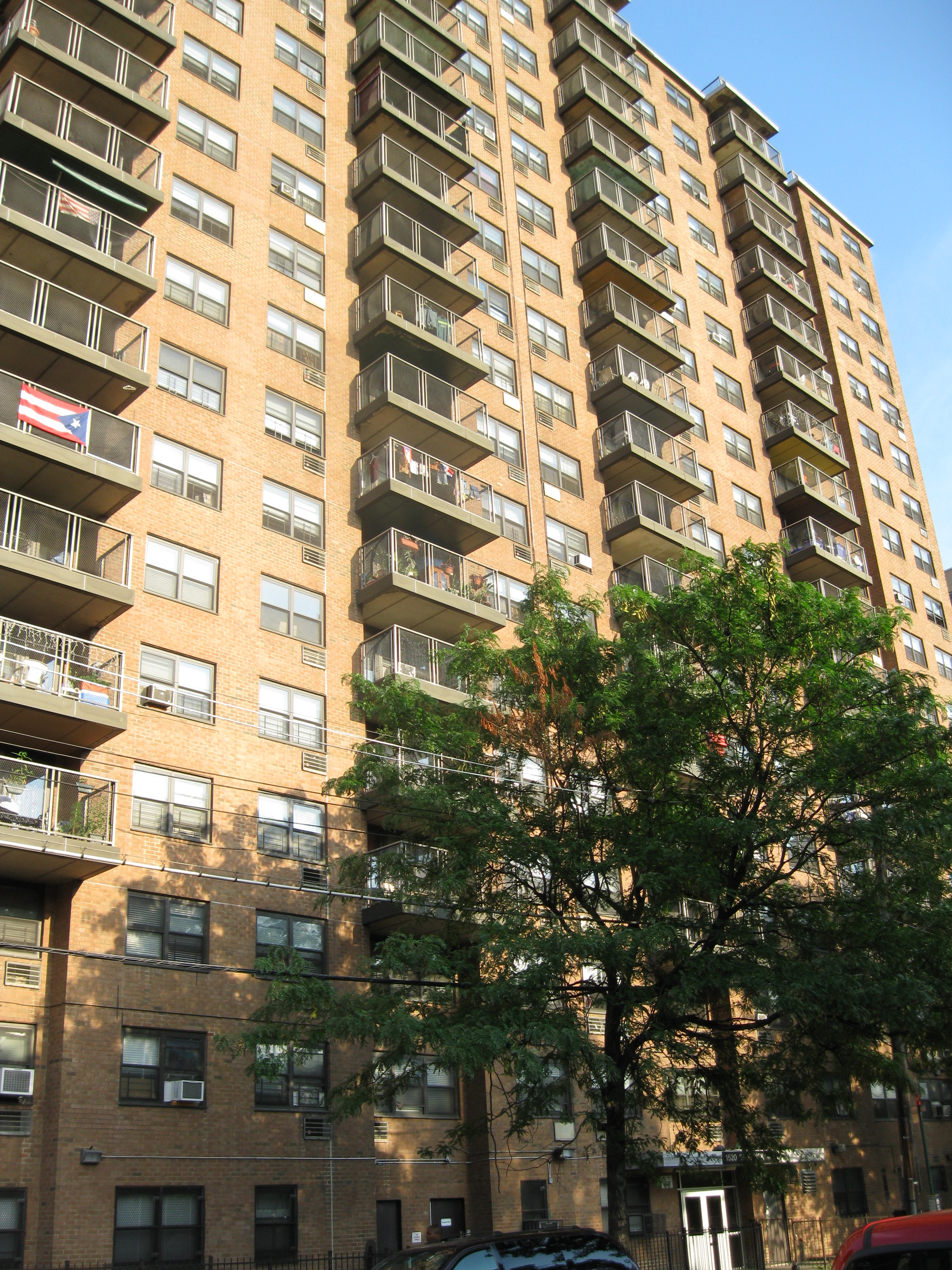
1520 Sedgwick Avenue where DJ Kool Herc threw his first parties in the Bronx, New York City in 1973, considered to be the birth of hip-hop.

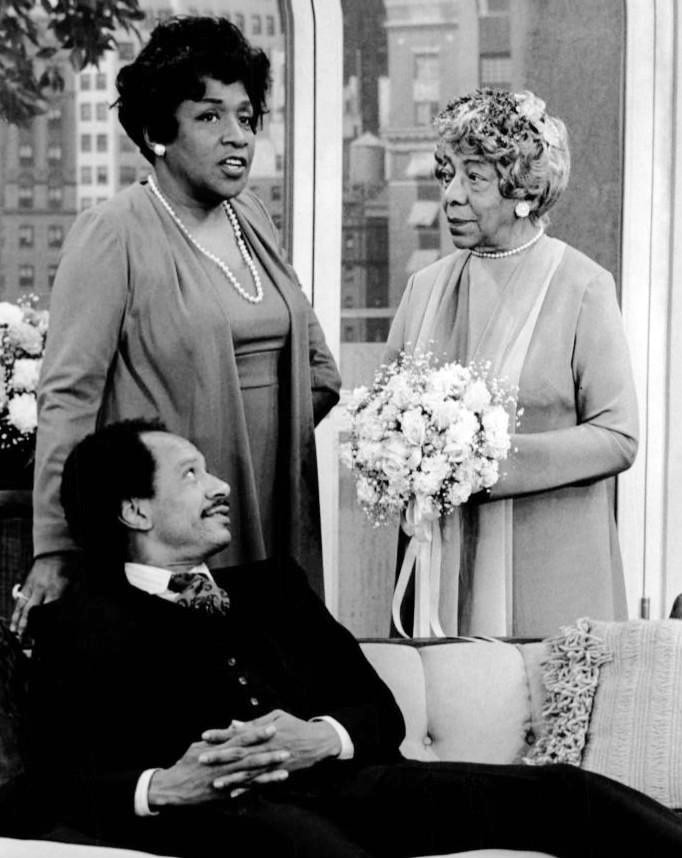
The cast of The Jeffersons in 1976. The Jeffersons ran from 1975 to 1985, and was the second-longest running TV series with a mainly African-American cast.

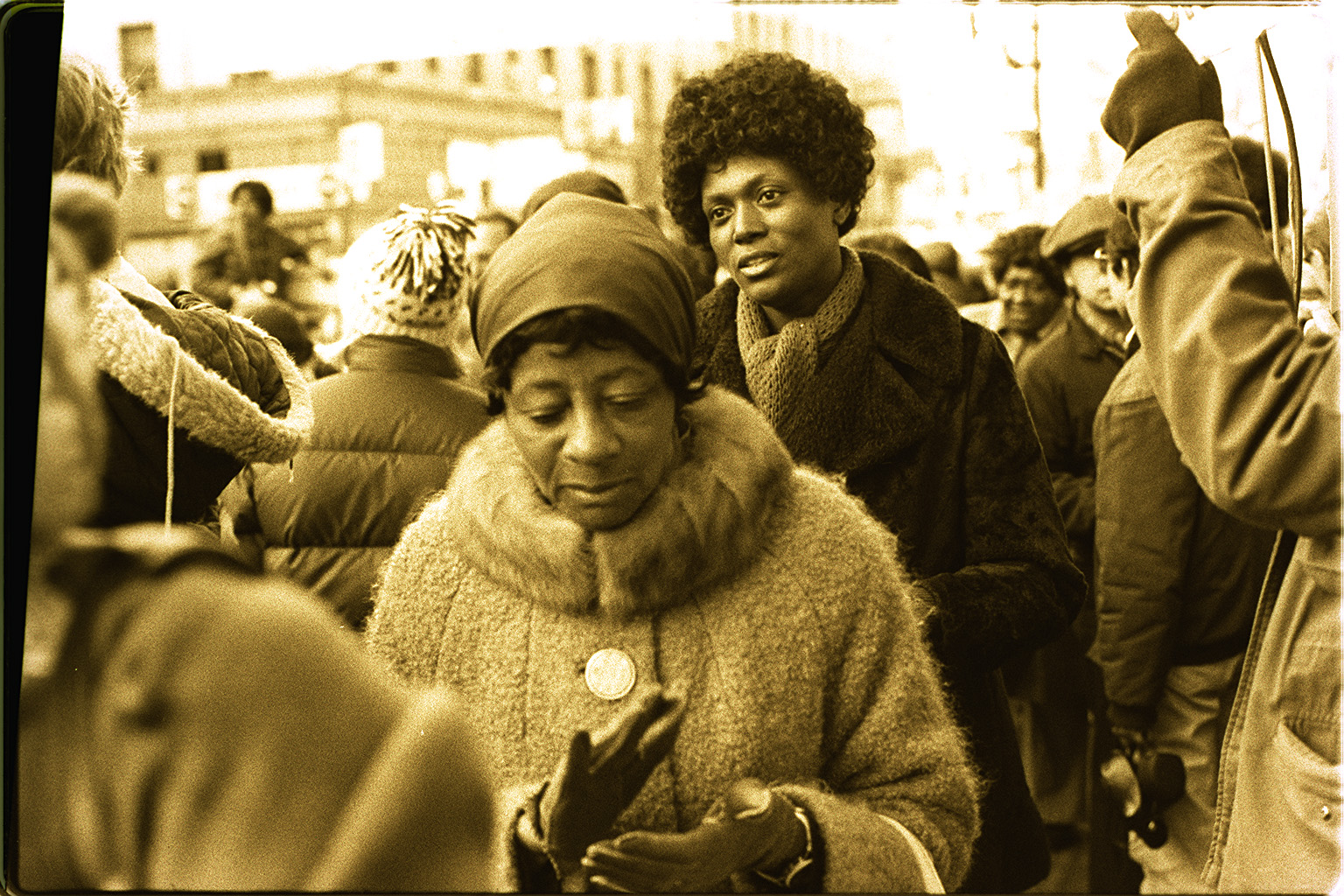
Followers of Jim Jones in San Francisco in January 1977

== 1980s ==
In 1982, Michael Jackson released Thriller, which became the best-selling album of all time.

The Miracle Valley shootout in October 1982 saw two Black churchgoers killed and seven Arizona law enforcement officers injured.

In 1983, Guion Bluford became the first African American to go into space in NASA's program. President Ronald Reagan signed a bill in 1983 to create a federal holiday to honor Martin Luther King Jr., who was assassinated in 1968 and considered a martyr to civil rights. Established by legislation in 1983, Martin Luther King Jr. Day was first celebrated as a national holiday on January 20, 1986. Alice Walker received the Pulitzer Prize in 1983 for her novel The Color Purple. In September 1983, Vanessa L. Williams became the first African American to win the title of Miss America as Miss America 1984.

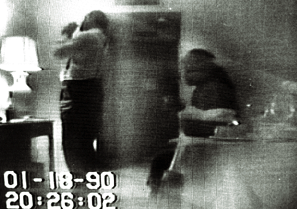
Marion Barry, Mayor of Washington DC, filmed smoking crack on a police surveillance tape, 1990

The crack cocaine epidemic had a devastating effect on Black America. As early as 1981, reports of crack were appearing in Los Angeles, San Diego, Miami, and Houston. In 1984, the distribution and use of crack exploded. In 1984, in some major cities such as New York, Philadelphia, Houston, Los Angeles, and Detroit, one dosage unit of crack could be obtained for as little as $2.50 (equivalent to $7.75 in 2025).

Between 1984 and 1989, the homicide rate for Black males aged 14 to 17 more than doubled, and the homicide rate for Black males aged 18 to 24 increased nearly as much. During this period, the Black community also suffered a 20%–100% increase in fetal death rates, low birth-weight babies, weapons arrests, and the number of children in foster care.

The beginning of the crack epidemic coincided with the rise of hip hop music in the Black community in the mid-1980s, strongly influencing the evolution of hardcore hip hop and gangsta rap, as crack and hip hop became the two leading fundamentals of urban street culture.

The Cosby Show begins as a TV series in 1984. Featuring an upper-middle-class family with comedian Bill Cosby as a physician and head of the family. It was different from prior representations of Black families in television in showing an affluent Black family with relatable dynamics and dominated television ratings throughout the 1980s.

On November 21, 1984, top youth basketballer Ben Wilson was shot and killed in Chicago. Wilson was regarded as the top high school player in the U.S., by scouts and coaches attending the 1984 Athletes For Better Education basketball camp.

11 members of the Black liberation and back-to-nature group MOVE died during a standoff with police in West Philadelphia on May 13, 1985. John Africa, the founder of MOVE was killed, as well as five other adults and five children. 65 homes were destroyed after a police helicopter dropped an incendiary device, causing an out of control fire in surrounding houses.

The film The Color Purple was released to box office success in December 1985. Set in the early 20th Century, The Color Purple tells the story of a young Black girl named Celie Harris who faces issues both public and socially hidden, including domestic violence, incest, pedophilia, poverty, racism, and sexism. The Color Purple has been described as "a plea for respect for Black women."

In January 1987 in rural Forsyth County, Georgia, about 20,000 demonstrators took part in a march after a previous march in the county was disrupted by white supremacists and Klansmen in one of the largest civil rights demonstrations since the 1960s.

Beloved by Toni Morrison was published in 1987. In 2006, a New York Times survey of writers and literary critics ranked it as the best work of American fiction in the last 25 years. After producing additional masterworks, Toni Morrison was later awarded the Nobel Prize for Literature.

In 1988, track and field athlete Florence Griffith Joyner, also known as "Flo Jo", won three gold and one silver medal at the 1988 Summer Olympics. At the time, her medal haul was the second most for a female track and field athlete in history.

1989 saw the first major African-American gangsta rap album - N.W.A's Straight Outta Compton. Gangsta rap would be recurrently accused of promoting anti-social behavior and broad criminality, especially assault, homicide and drug dealing, misogyny, promiscuity and materialism.

Ron Brown was elected chairman of the Democratic National Committee in 1989, becoming the first African American to lead a major United States political party. Colin Powell was appointed as Chairman of the Joint Chiefs of Staff in 1989.

In 1989, Douglas Wilder was elected as the first African-American governor of Virginia, and the first African-American elected governor of the United States.

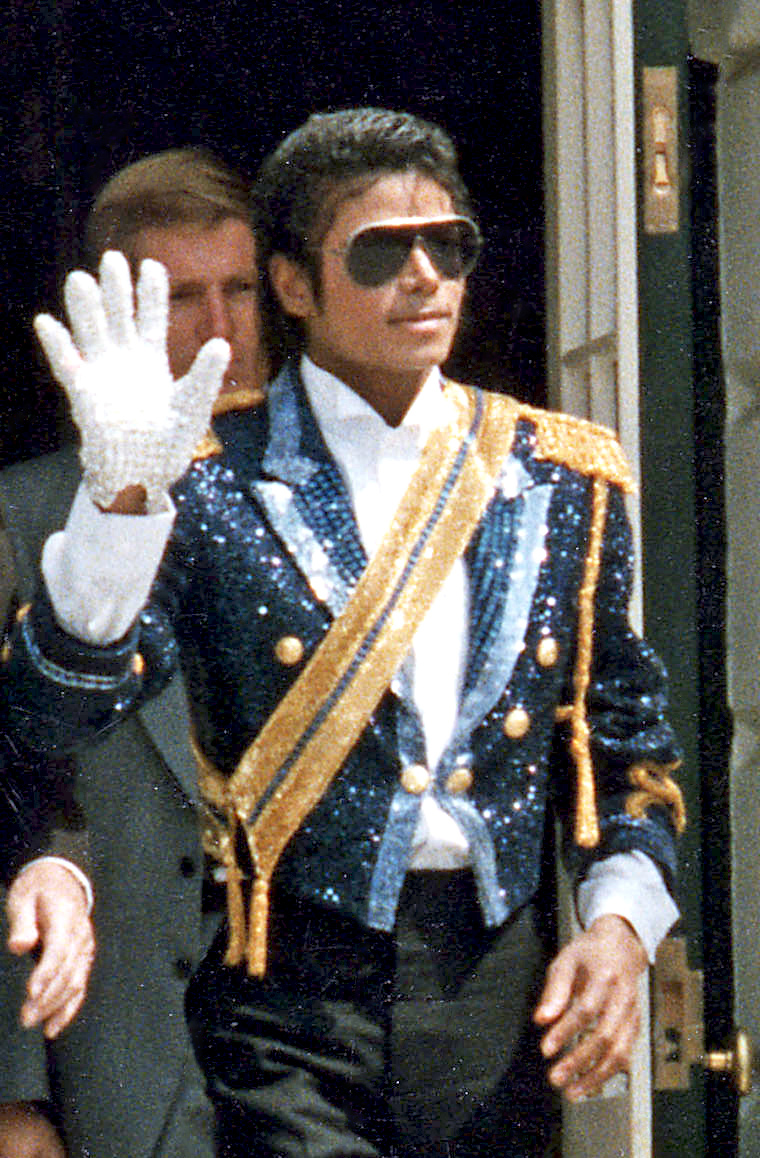
Michael Jackson's 1982 album Thriller became the best selling album of all time.

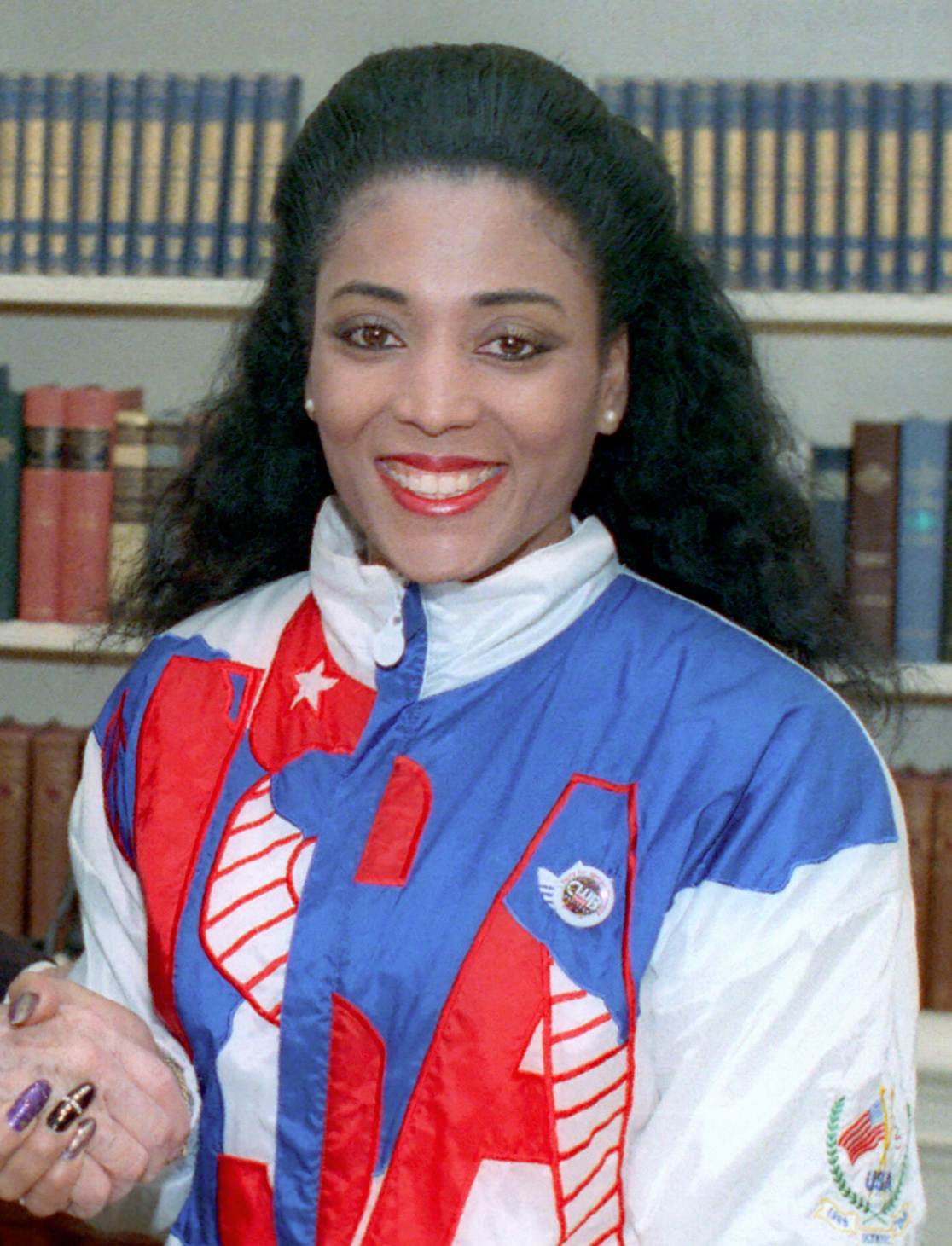
Track and field star Florence Griffith Joyner won three gold and one silver medal at the 1988 Summer Olympics.

== 1990s ==
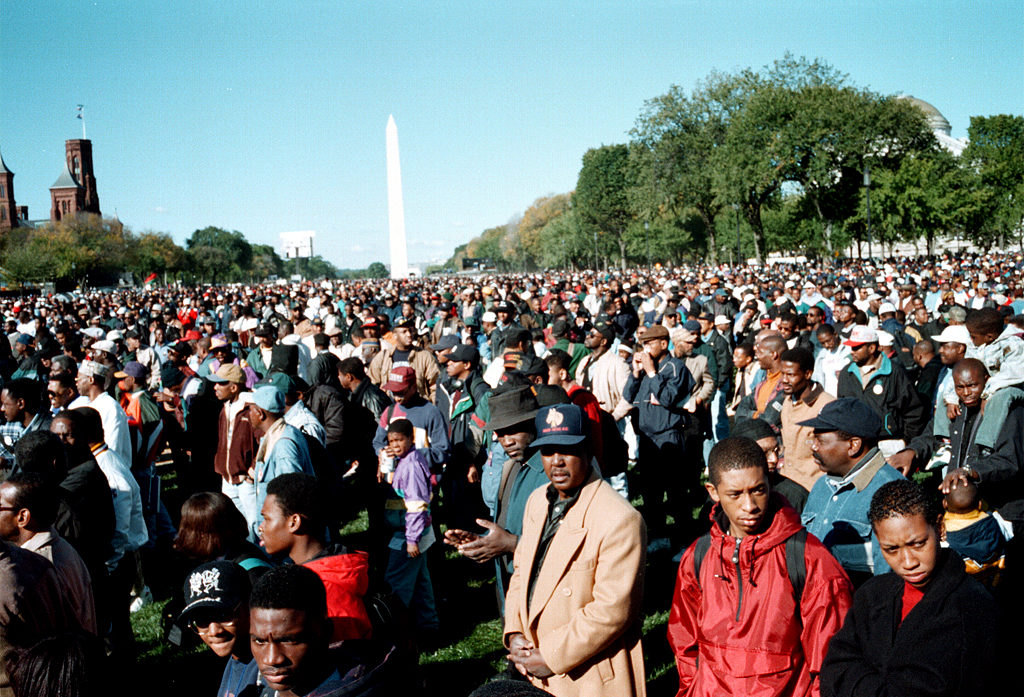
A crowd at the Million Man March, Washington DC, May 1995.

Clarence Thomas was confirmed to the U.S. Supreme Court in 1991.

In July 1991, serial killer and cannibal Jeffrey Dahmer was arrested. Eleven of Dahmer's 17 victims were African-Americans.

The 1992 Los Angeles riots erupted after the officers accused of beating Rodney King in March 1991 were acquitted. In 1992 Mae Carol Jemison became the first African-American woman to travel in space when she went into orbit aboard the Space Shuttle Endeavour. Carol Moseley Braun (D-Illinois) became the first African-American woman to be elected to the United States Senate on November 3, 1992.

Director Spike Lee's film Malcolm X was released in 1992, a celebrated biography of the civil rights leader and former leader of the Nation of Islam.

In 1993, civil rights activist C. Delores Tucker started publicly campaigning against misogyny in rap music. Tucker believed that the attacks upon Black women in hip-hop lyrics threatened the moral foundation of African American society. In response, Delores Tucker was lyrically disparaged by multiple rappers, including Tupac, and Eminem.

Cornel West's text, Race Matters, was published in 1994.

The Million Man March was held on October 16, 1995, in Washington, D.C., co-initiated by Louis Farrakhan and James Bevel. The Million Woman March was held on October 25, 1997, in Philadelphia.

The racially charged murder trial of O.J. Simpson transfixed America between January and October 1995. The trial of the already famous NFL star and actor O. J. Simpson was the most publicized in U.S. history.

== 2000s ==
On January 20, 2001, Colin Powell was appointed as the first African American to be Secretary of State. In June 2003, the Supreme Court in Grutter v. Bollinger upheld the University of Michigan Law School's racial admission policy. In the simultaneously heard Gratz v. Bollinger, the university was required to change a racial admissions policy.

In 2004, the founder of the New York-based Nuwaubian Nation, Dwight York, was sentenced to 135 years for child molestation and racketeering.

The Millions More Movement held a march in Washington D.C on October 15, 2005. Rosa Parks died at the age of 92 on October 25, 2005. Rosa Parks was a noted civil rights activist who had helped initiate the Montgomery bus boycott in 1955. As an honor, her body lay in state in the Capitol Rotunda in Washington, D.C., before her funeral.

In March 2007, the Cherokee Nation voted to expel African American descendants of slaves held by the Cherokee from the Cherokee tribe. This ruling ignited a 10-year legal battle, with the Black Cherokee freedmen regaining their legal status within the Cherokee Nation in 2017.

On June 28, 2007, the U.S. Supreme Court in Parents Involved in Community Schools v. Seattle School District No. 1, decided along with Meredith v. Jefferson County Board of Education, ruled that school districts could not assign students to particular public schools solely for the purpose of achieving racial integration; it declined to recognize racial balancing as a compelling state interest.

On June 3, 2008, Barack Obama received enough delegates by the end of state primaries to be the presumptive Democratic Party of the United States nominee. On August 28, 2008, at the 2008 Democratic National Convention, in a stadium filled with supporters, Obama accepted the Democratic nomination for President of the United States. Obama was elected 44th President of the United States of America on November 4, 2008, opening his victory speech with, "If there is anyone out there who still doubts that America is a place where all things are possible; who still wonders if the dream of our founders is alive in our time; who still questions the power of our democracy, tonight is your answer."

On January 20, 2009, Obama was sworn in as the 44th President of the United States, the first African American to become president. Former Maryland Lt. Governor Michael Steele, an African American, was elected as Chairman of the Republican National Committee on January 30, 2009.

In October 2009, Obama was awarded the Nobel Peace Prize.

In 2010, the U.S. Postal Service issued a commemorative six-stamp set portraying twelve civil rights pioneers.

== 2010s ==
On July 19, 2010, Shirley Sherrod was pressured to resign from the U.S. Department of Agriculture because of controversial publicity. The department apologized to her for her being inaccurately portrayed as racist toward white Americans.

In 2013, protests were held across the United States following the death of an unarmed African-American teenager, Trayvon Martin, who was shot by George Zimmerman in Florida. Zimmerman was charged with murder, but later acquitted. In reaction to Martin's death and Zimmerman's acquittal, Black activists Alicia Garza, Patrisse Cullors, and Opal Tometi popularized the hashtag #BlackLivesMatter.

In 2014, massive protests were held in Ferguson, Missouri, following the shooting death of Michael Brown Jr. by Ferguson police. In July 2014, the death of Eric Garner while being held in a chokehold by a New York City policeman, Daniel Pantaleo, sparked additional outrage and protests across the country. In the wake of these deaths, and others, Black Lives Matter developed into a nationwide non-violent movement.

On June 17, 2015, Nine Black churchgoers were murdered in the racially motivated Charleston church shooting.

From 2019, the American Descendants of Slavery (ADOS) political movement began to differentiate themselves from the growing number of Black African immigrants in the United States and Black immigrants in the U.S. from the Caribbean.

== 2020s ==
In later May 2020, a video was posted on social media platforms showing George Floyd being murdered by a Minneapolis Police Department officer, Derek Chauvin, who knelt on Floyd's neck for over ten minutes. Floyd's murder sparked outrage and condemnation across the country and the globe. Despite restrictions on public gatherings of large sizes due to the COVID-19 pandemic, large protests were held in cities across the United States as well as in many other nations.

On August 28, 2020, thousands of people gathered at the Lincoln Memorial in Washington, D.C., for the Commitment March, organized by Rev. Al Sharpton and joined by Martin Luther King III, in support of black civil rights.

In late 2020, the Portland foreclosure protest was a response to the eviction of an Afro-indigenous family in Portland, Oregon.

Across 2020, the COVID-19 pandemic had a disproportionately negative impact upon Black Americans. Black Americans died from the virus at a higher rate than the general population. Black Americans also suffered significant economic hardship due to the virus.

On March 31, 2019, rapper, entrepreneur, and activist Nipsey Hussle was murdered in Los Angeles. The news of Hussle's death reverberated across Black America.

On November 3, 2020, Kamala Harris was elected the first Black Vice President of the United States.

On April 23, 2025, President Donald Trump revoked Executive order 14041. Originally signed by President Biden, the order declares "It is the policy of my Administration to advance educational equity, excellence, and economic opportunity in partnership with HBCUs, and to ensure that these vital institutions of higher learning have the resources and support to continue to thrive for generations to come."

== Political representation ==
In 1989, Douglas Wilder became the first African American to be elected governor in U.S. history. In 1992 Carol Moseley-Braun of Illinois became the first black woman to be elected to the U.S. Senate. In 2000 there were 8,936 black officeholders in the United States, showing a net increase of 7,467 since 1970. In 2001 there were 484 black mayors.

The 38 African-American members of Congress formed the Congressional Black Caucus, which serves as a political bloc for issues relating to African Americans. The appointment of blacks to high federal offices—including General Colin Powell, Chairman of the U.S. Armed Forces Joint Chiefs of Staff, 1989–1993, United States Secretary of State, 2001–2005; Condoleezza Rice, Assistant to the President for National Security Affairs, 2001–2004, Secretary of State in, 2005–2009; Ron Brown, United States Secretary of Commerce, 1993–1996, Eric Holder, Attorney General of the United States, 2009–present; and Supreme Court justices Thurgood Marshall and Clarence Thomas—also demonstrates the increasing contributions of blacks in the political arena.

In 2009, Michael S. Steele was elected as the first African-American chairman of the national Republican Party.

In 2021, Ebenezer Baptist Church pastor Raphael Warnock became the first African American Democratic Senator from a former Confederate state.

=== 2008 presidential election of Barack Obama ===
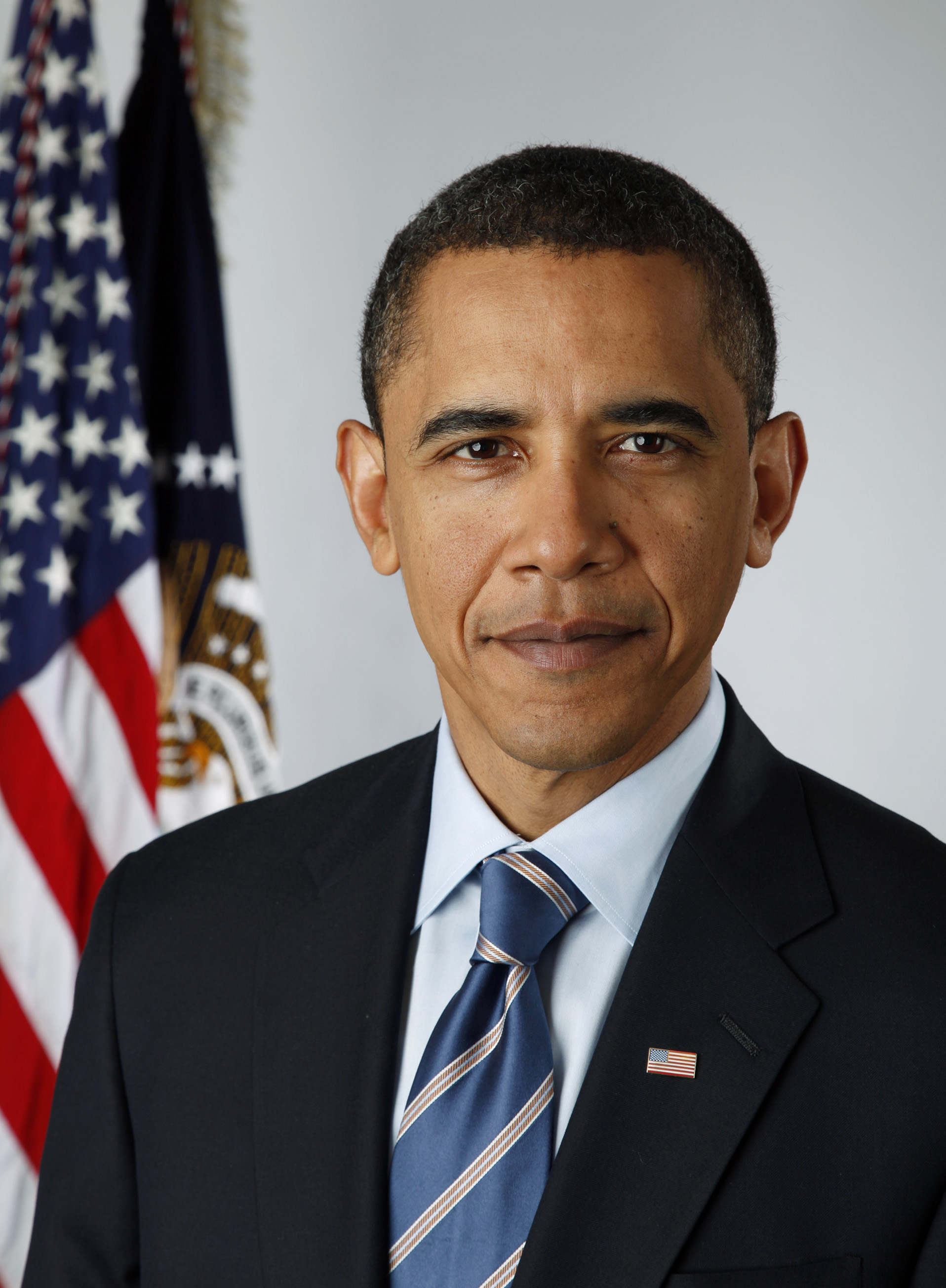
The first African-American President of the United States, Barack Obama

In 2008 presidential elections, Illinois senator Barack Obama became the first black presidential nominee of the Democratic Party, the first Black presidential candidate from a major political party. He was elected as the 44th President of the United States on November 4, 2008, and inaugurated on January 20, 2009.

At least 95 percent of African-American voters voted for Obama. Obama won big among young and minority voters, bringing a number of new states to the Democratic electoral column. Obama became the first Democrat since Jimmy Carter to win a popular vote majority. He also received overwhelming support from a majority of Asian and Hispanic Americans. Obama lost the overall white vote, but he won a larger proportion of white votes than any previous non-incumbent Democratic presidential candidate since Jimmy Carter.

== Interracial marriages ==
Marriages between African-Americans and people of other races have significantly increased since all race-based legal restrictions on interracial marriage ended following Loving v. Virginia in 1967. The overall rate of marriages between African-Americans and non-Black spouses more than tripled between 1980 and 2015, from 5% to 18%. 24% of all Black male newlyweds married outside their race in 2015, compared to 12% of Black female newlyweds.

== Economic situation ==
Nearly 25% of all black Americans live below the poverty line in the early 21st century, approximately the same percentage as the percentage of all black Americans who lived below the poverty line in 1968. The child poverty rate has also increased among African Americans and their rate of unemployment is disproportionately high in comparison to the rate of unemployment among members of other ethnic groups.

African Americans began to resettle the South after the civil rights movement during the New Great Migration. This can be attributed to the deindustrialization of the North, the opening of jobs in the "New South" and a lower costs of living, cultural, religious, and familial ties, and the perception of lessening discrimination.

Economic progress for black people reaching the extremes of wealth has been slow. According to Forbes "richest" lists, Oprah Winfrey was the richest African American of the 20th century and has been the world's only black billionaire in 2004, 2005, and 2006. Not only was Winfrey the world's only black billionaire but she has been the only black person on the Forbes 400 list nearly every year since 1995. BET founder Bob Johnson briefly joined her on the list from 2001 to 2003 before his ex-wife acquired part of his fortune; although he returned to the list in 2006, he did not make it in 2007. Black people currently comprise 0.25% of America's economic elite; they make up 13% of the total U.S. population.

== Social issues ==
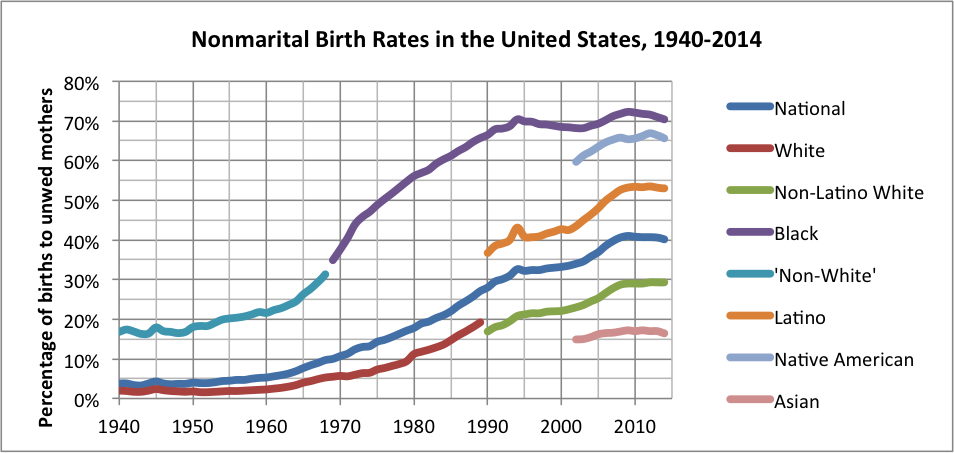
Nonmarital birth rates by race in the United States from 1940 through 2014. The rate for African Americans is shown in purple. Data is from the National Vital Statistics System reports published by the CDC National Center for Health Statistics. Note: Prior to 1969, nonmarital births among African Americans were included with other minority groups as "Non-White".

Despite the gains of the civil rights movement, other factors have resulted in African-American communities suffering from extremely high incarceration rates of their young males. Contributing factors have been the drug war waged by successive administrations, imposition of sentencing guidelines at the federal and state levels, cutbacks in government assistance, restructuring of industry since the mid-20th century and extensive loss of working-class jobs leading to high poverty rates, and government neglect, an erosion of African American two parent families, and unfavorable social policies. African Americans have the highest imprisonment rate of any major ethnic group in the United States and the world, and are sentenced to death at a rate higher than any other ethnic group.

The southern states of the former Confederacy, which historically had maintained slavery longer than in the remainder of the country and imposed post-Reconstruction oppression, have the highest rates of incarceration and application of the death penalty.

== See also ==
- Timeline of African-American history
- Timeline of the civil rights movement
