= Day of Atonement (disambiguation) =

Day of Atonement may refer to:

== Religion ==
- In Judaism:
  - Yom Kippur, the Jewish Day of Atonement
  - Yom Kippur Katan ("Minor Day of Atonement")
- In Islam:
  - Day of Atonement (Nation of Islam), a national day established in 1995 by the Nation of Islam
- In Christianity:
  - Investigative Judgment, the antitypical Day of Atonement according to the Seventh-day Adventist Church
  - Christian observances of Yom Kippur

== Cultural ==
- Day of Atonement (film)
- Day of Atonement (play), a play by Samson Raphaelson, which became the 1927 film The Jazz Singer
