= Remorse =

Distressing emotion of regret

Remorse is a distressing emotion experienced by an individual who regrets actions which they have done in the past which they deem to be shameful, hurtful, or wrong. Remorse is closely allied to guilt and self-directed resentment. When a person regrets an earlier action or failure to act, it may be because of remorse or in response to various other consequences, including being punished for the act or omission. People may express remorse through apologies, trying to repair the damage they have caused, or self-imposed punishments.

In a legal context, the perceived remorse of an offender is assessed by Western justice systems during trials, sentencing, parole hearings, and in restorative justice. However, there are epistemological problems with assessing an offender's level of remorse.

In general, a person needs to be unable to feel fear, as well as remorse, in order to develop psychopathic traits. Legal and business professions such as insurance have done research on the expression of remorse via apologies, primarily because of the potential litigation and financial implications.

== Studies on apologizing ==
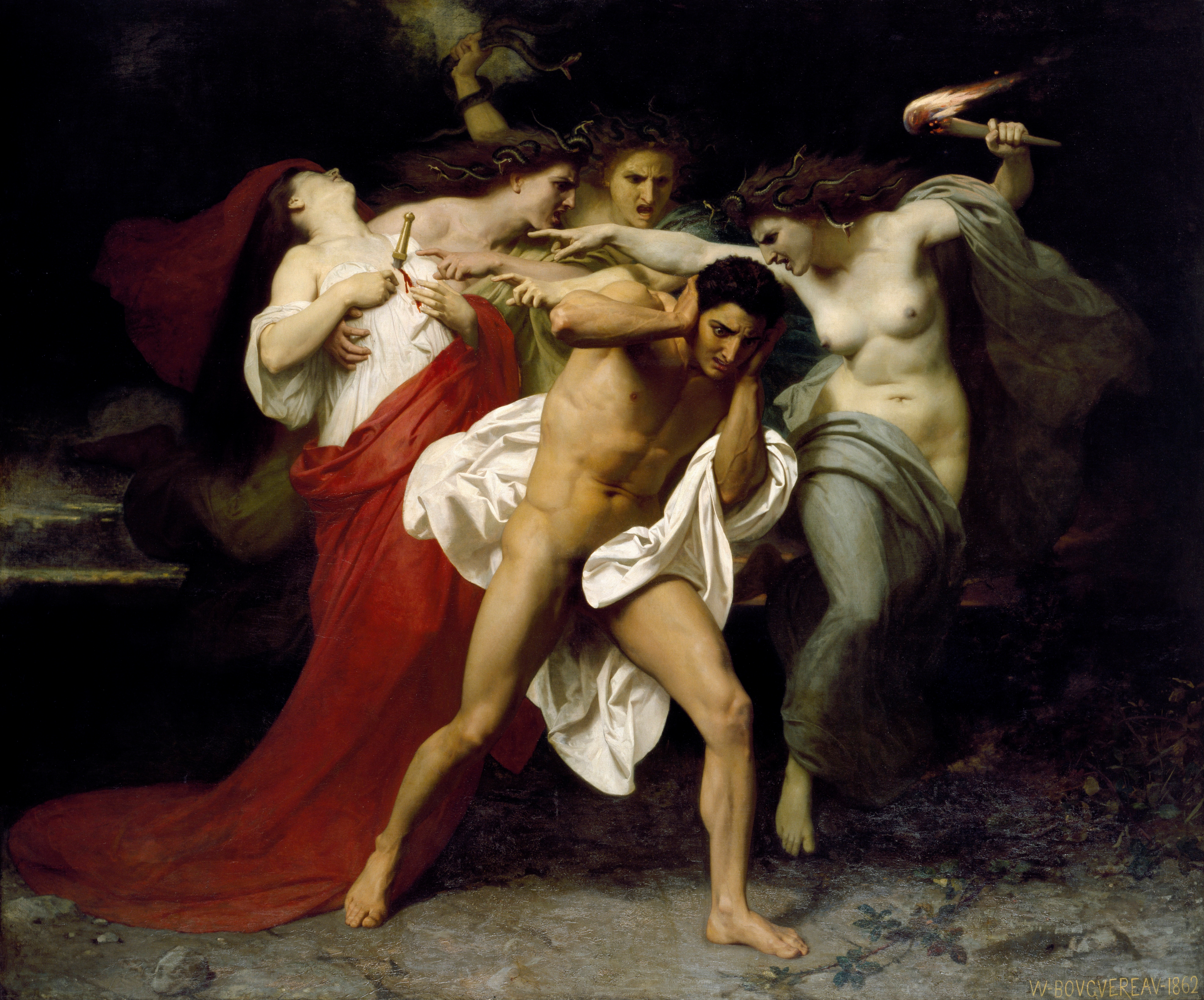
The Remorse of Orestes (1862), by William-Adolphe Bouguereau

Studies on apologizing include The Five Languages of Apology by Gary Chapman and Jennifer Thomas and On Apology by Aaron Lazare. These studies indicate that effective apologies which express remorse typically include:

- a detailed account of the offense
- acknowledgment of the hurt or damage done
- acceptance of the responsibility for, and ownership of, the act or omission
- an explanation that recognises one's own role.

As well, apologies usually include a statement or expression of regret, humility, or remorse; a request for forgiveness; and an expression of a credible commitment to change or a promise that it will not happen again. Apologies may also include some form of restitution, compensation or token gesture in line with the damage that one has caused. John Kleefeld has encapsulated this into "four Rs" that typically make for a fully effective apology: remorse, responsibility, resolution and reparation. When an apology is delayed, for instance if a friend has been wronged and the offending party does not apologise, the perception of the offense can compound over time. This is sometimes known as compounding remorse.

== Compunction ==
The word "compunction" in modern times generally denotes a relatively slight pricking of conscience, while its older meaning expressed a sense of actively expressing remorse, usually requiring remorseful individuals to physically approach the person to whom they wish to express regret.

Medieval-style compunction could serve as an incentive to partake in the sacrament of confession or penance.

In an encyclical letter to the Catholic church published in 2024, Pope Francis explores the nature of "sincere" compunction, noting that

Compunction is not a feeling of guilt that makes us discouraged or obsessed with our unworthiness, but a beneficial 'piercing' that purifies and heals the heart.

== Falsified expressions ==
In a study led by Leanne ten Brinke, a professor at the University of British Columbia, participants' genuine and falsified emotions were studied to investigate behavioral and facial cues. Brinke and others found a significant difference in the presence of facial expressions in real and false remorse.

With falsified emotions of remorse, they found that the participants experienced a greater range of emotions, which are close to genuine feelings, while deceptive descriptions of remorse were associated with positive emotions, such as happiness and surprise.

The positive emotions felt by participants demonstrating a deceptive description of remorse are likely due to the leakage of genuine feelings from incomplete deception. Brinke and others established that participants appeared surprised because they could only raise their eyebrows when trying to appear sad, which then caused the participants to feel embarrassed, feel genuine happiness, and let a smile slip.

In contrast to deceptive and falsified accounts, genuine accounts were expressed with fewer emotions. Participants showing deceptive or falsified emotions overcompensated their emotional performance. Genuine negative feelings of remorse leaked by the lower face were immediately covered up with a neutral expression. Brinke recorded a small number of body language and verbal cues for deceptive participants; instead, she recorded a large number of speech hesitations that cued deceptive and falsified accounts of remorse. Current findings of deceptive and falsified remorse have a practical use for measuring the veracity of remorseful displays for judges, jurors, parole officers, and psychologists when sentencing offenders.

== Psychopathy ==
Psychopathic individuals are best known for their flagrant disregard for social and moral norms. Psychopaths have dysfunctional personal relationships, characterized by violence, exploitation, and philandering. Emotionally, they are incapable of feeling guilt or empathy, they respond abnormally to fear and pain, and other emotions are shallow compared to population norms. Psychopaths refuse to adopt social and moral norms because they are not swayed by the emotions, such as guilt, remorse, or fear of retribution, that influence other human beings.

Human societies tend to value remorse; conversely, a person who exhibits a lack of remorse is often perceived in a negative light. It is widely accepted that remorse is the proper reaction to misconduct. Remorse may originate in from either actual or contrived regret for the misconduct that results in being caught or causing harm. Research has shown that the facial expressions of offenders on trial affect the jury's attitude and, in turn, the sentencing decision. While remorse may present guilt that may influence a jury's decision, a lack of remorse influences the jury even more because it is one trait of psychopathy.

Psychopathy represents a configuration of traits that are missing within a person's personality, such as a lack of empathy and remorse. Knowledge of psychopathic traits has been shown to affect how jurors perceive adult and juvenile offenders. Assessments of psychopathy are introduced to direct a relatively wide variety of questions in the legal system, so investigators have started examining the effects of psychopathy evidences. Through simulations in studies by John Edens, who is a psychology professor at Texas A&M University, data suggests that attributing psychopathic traits to adult and juvenile offenders can have a noticeable negative effect on how these individuals are viewed by others. Remorselessness, a key feature of psychopathy, proves to be a strong predictor of juror attitudes.

In the study by John Edens, a pool of offenders were labeled as either having a "disorder" condition or having "no disorder". Those labeled as "disorder" were given death verdicts by mock jurors. In the study, traits, such as callousness, remorselessness, and superficial charm, were a strong predictor of negative consequences for the offenders. This study found that remorselessness has the largest effect on the mock jurors' opinions of the "disorder" offenders and it explains support for the death sentence. The results of this study suggest that free of mental health testimonies, perceptions of a defendant's personality traits may have serious implications in the sentencing decisions of a capital case.

One study on psychopaths found that, under certain circumstances, they could willfully empathize with others, and that their empathic reaction initiated the same way it does for controls. Psychopathic criminals were brain-scanned while watching videos of a person harming another individual. The psychopaths' empathic reaction initiated the same way it did for controls when they were instructed to empathize with the harmed individual, and the area of the brain relating to pain was activated when the psychopaths were asked to imagine how the harmed individual felt. The research suggests psychopaths can switch empathy on at will, which would enable them to be both callous and charming. The team who conducted the study say they do not know how to transform this willful empathy into the spontaneous empathy most people have, though they propose it might be possible to rehabilitate psychopaths by helping them to activate their "empathy switch". Others suggested that it remains unclear whether psychopaths' experience of empathy was the same as that of controls, and also questioned the possibility of devising therapeutic interventions that would make the empathic reactions more automatic.

One problem with the theory that the ability to turn empathy on and off constitutes psychopathy is that such a theory would classify socially sanctioned violence and punishment as psychopathy, as these entail suspending empathy towards certain individuals and/or groups. The attempt to get around this by standardizing tests of psychopathy for cultures with different norms of punishment is criticized in this context for being based on the assumption that people can be classified in discrete cultures while cultural influences are in reality mixed and every person encounters a mosaic of influences. Psychopathy may be an artefact of psychiatry's standardization along imaginary sharp lines between cultures, as opposed to an actual difference in the brain.

Work conducted by Professor Jean Decety with large samples of incarcerated psychopaths offers additional insights. In one study, psychopaths were scanned while viewing video clips depicting people being intentionally hurt. They were also tested on their responses to seeing short videos of facial expressions of pain. The participants in the high-psychopathy group exhibited significantly less activation in the ventromedial prefrontal cortex, amygdala, and periaqueductal gray parts of the brain, but more activity in the striatum and the insula when compared to control participants. In a second study, individuals with psychopathy exhibited a strong response in pain-affective brain regions when taking an imagine-self perspective, but failed to recruit the neural circuits that were activated in controls during an imagine-other perspective—in particular the ventromedial prefrontal cortex and amygdala—which may contribute to their lack of empathic concern.

Researchers have investigated whether people who have high levels of psychopathy have sufficient levels of cognitive empathy but lack the ability to use affective empathy. People who score highly on psychopathy measures are less likely to exhibit affective empathy. There was a strong negative correlation, showing that psychopathy and lack of affective empathy correspond strongly. The DANVA-2 found those who scored highly on the psychopathy scale do not lack in recognising emotion in facial expressions. Therefore, such individuals do not lack in perspective-talking ability but do lack in compassion and concern towards the wellbeing of others.

In fact, in an experiment published in March 2007 at the University of Southern California neuroscientist Antonio Damasio and his colleagues showed that subjects with damage to the ventromedial prefrontal cortex lack the ability to empathically feel their way to moral answers, and that when confronted with moral dilemmas, these brain-damaged patients coldly came up with "end-justifies-the-means" answers, leading Damasio to conclude that the point was not that they reached immoral conclusions, but that when they were confronted by a difficult issue – in this case as whether to shoot down a passenger plane hijacked by terrorists before it hits a major city – these patients appear to reach decisions without the anguish that afflicts those with normally functioning brains. According to Adrian Raine, a clinical neuroscientist also at the University of Southern California, one of this study's implications is that society may have to rethink how it judges immoral people: "Psychopaths often feel no empathy or remorse. Without that awareness, people relying exclusively on reasoning seem to find it harder to sort their way through moral thickets. Does that mean they should be held to different standards of accountability?"

Psychopathic individuals do not show regret or remorse. This was thought to be due to an inability to generate this emotion in response to negative outcomes. However, a study found that psychopathic people experience regret but did not use the regret to guide their choice in behavior.

== Forgiveness ==
The perception of remorse is essential to an apology, and the greater the perception of remorse the more effective the apology. An effective apology reduces negative consequences and facilitates cognitive and behavioral changes associated with forgiveness.

With empathy as the mediator between apologies and forgiveness and remorse as the essential part to an apology, one can expect empathy to mediate perceived remorse forgiveness. Remorse may signal that one is suffering psychologically because of one's negative behavior, which leads to empathy from the victim, who may then express forgiveness.

In a study by James Davis and Greg Gold, 170 university students filled out questionnaires about forgiveness within interpersonal relationships. Davis and Gold's findings suggest that when a victim perceives an apology to be remorseful, then they believe the negative behavior will not occur again, and they will be more willing to forgive the perpetrator.

== Versus self-condemnation ==
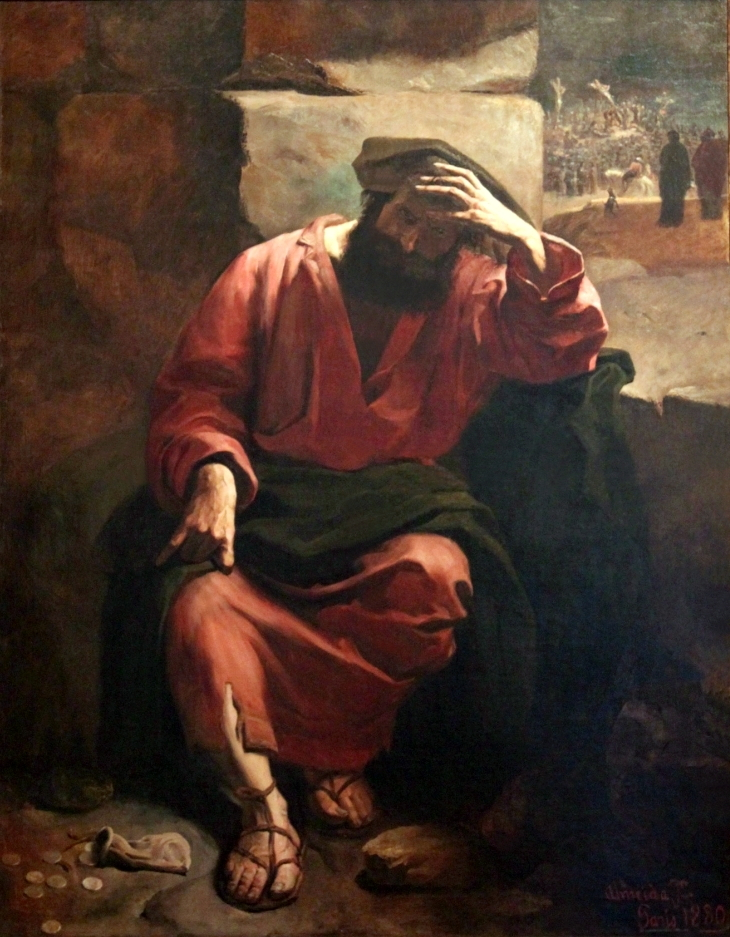
Judas's Remorse (1880) by Almeida Júnior

Remorse is closely linked with the willingness to humble oneself and to repent for one's misdeeds. Remorse is not as such when defined through the view of self-condemnation.

Self-condemnation, more so than remorse, is said to be associated with poor psychological well-being. Remorse captures feelings of guilt, regret, and sorrow. Forgiveness does not eliminate all negative feelings, but it may entail the reduction of bitter and angry feelings, not feelings of disappointment, regret, or sorrow. A study by Mickie Fisher found that people who forgive themselves for serious offenses may continue to harbor remorse or regret.

In contrast to remorse, self-condemnation reflects a more global, negative, severe stance toward oneself. Remorse may convey a sense of sorrow, while self-condemnation suggests the kind of loathing and desire for punishment that characterizes interpersonal grudges. Fisher suggests that self-forgiveness does not necessarily require one to get rid of feelings or regret or remorse.

Based on the study by Fisher, self-forgiveness seems to relate more closely to self-condemnation and not remorse. When trying to convince people to forgive themselves, it is crucial not to erase the potentially adaptive feelings of remorse along with the more destructive self-condemnation. People can grow and experience prosocial behaviors once they accept responsibility for their own transgressions. For genuine self-forgiveness, one must first accept responsibility for their offenses and not rush to rid themselves of guilty feelings.

== Buyer's remorse ==
Purchases can be divided into two different categories: material or experiential. A material good is made to be kept in the buyer's possession, while an experiential good provides the buyer with life experience. A material good provides the buyer with a more enduring pleasure compared with an experiential, as these two purchases also result in different types of regret.

While experiential purchases bring about regrets of a missed opportunity, material purchases result in buyer's remorse, which means that a person dwells on how their material purchase measure up to other purchases they could have made and how it compares with other people's purchases. These comparisons diminish satisfaction from the original purpose. Past research explains that regrets of action are intense, but only in the short term, while regrets of inaction gains intensity over time and dominates people's experience. Major life choices, such as marriage, jobs, and education, are often the focus of regret.

Everyday experience suggests that everyday decisions are the most frequent causes of regret. Marketing directors know the effects of buyer's remorse, and use it to their advantage when planning marketing strategies. The regret felt over choosing a material over an experiential purchase depends on the pain of the factors underlying the purchase. Based on research by Thomas Gilovich and Emily Rosenzwig, material purchases are more likely to lead to regret, while experiential purchases give the buyer more satisfaction even over time.

== See also ==
- Atonement
- Confession
- Confession (religion)
- Guilt
- Moral emotions
- Non-apology
- Regret
- Remorse (painting)
- Repentance
- Resentment
- Shame
- Social emotions
