= Tynnetta Muhammad =

Wife of Elijah Muhammad

- Born: Tynnetta Alethea Nelson; 10 May 1941; Detroit, Michigan, U.S.
- Died: 16 February 2015 (aged 73)
- Resting place: Westlawn Cemetery, Detroit
- Occupations: writer; activist; composer
- Years active: c.1960–2015
- Notable work: The Comer by Night

Tynnetta Muhammad (10 May 1941 – 16 February 2015) was an American writer. In the 1960s, she wrote articles and columns for the Nation of Islam (NOI) newsletter Muhammad Speaks. She was one of Elijah Muhammad’s four wives and mother of four of his children.

After Louis Farrakhan revived the NOI, she wrote the weekly column of NOI theology and numerology, Unveiling the Number 19, in The Final Call. She was regularly referred to as "Mother Tynnetta Muhammad" in the movement; she is considered one of the "Mothers of the Faithful."

== Early life and education ==
Born Tynnetta Alethea Nelson, she grew up in Detroit. After her conversion to the NOI in 1958, she worked as a secretary for Elijah Muhammad. Under the name Tynnetta Deanar she wrote for the Women in Islam column in Muhammad Speaks. In some publications her first name is spelled "Tynetta".

== Family ==
She gave birth to four of his children; Madeeah, Ishmael, Rasul, and Ahmad.

== Ideology ==
=== In Muhammad Speaks ===
In the 1960s, Tynnetta wrote regularly in Muhammad Speaks on women's issues, and teaching about modesty and value of virtue. She concentrated on the subjects of proper deportment, dress and behavior of a female Muslim. She emphasized modest attire and cautioned "the Black Woman" to put away "the short western style of dress and social habits." She also stated that "the white woman" apparently "does not feel the sense of modesty in the strict manner of her darker associates".

In addition to her women's column she wrote articles quoting Biblical and Quranic passages to affirm Muhammad's prophetic status. She defended black separatism on the grounds that "as all bona fide divine spokesmen of the past, the Honorable Elijah Muhammad is carrying out the divine work of separating our people from the nation and people responsible for our captivity."

=== In The Final Call ===
After departure of Elijah Muhammad in 1975, Tynnetta rejected the reforms of his son Warith Deen Muhammad and sided with Louis Farrakhan's faction, becoming one of his earliest supporters. She praised Farrakhan as a great visionary and as the modern equivalent of John of Patmos. In her writings in the 1980s and 1990s, she became increasingly preoccupied with The Wheel sightings and a supposed forthcoming apocalypse, predicted by Elijah Muhammad, in which a "Mother Plane" from space would destroy the white race. She predicted this event using numerological analyses based on the sacred number 19, an idea derived from Rashad Khalifa.

She stated that the UFO was seen after the 1986 bombing of Tripoli. She also argued that the Space Shuttle Challenger disaster in the same year was divine punishment delivered on the USA, because "the aim and purpose of America's Space Program beginning in the 1960s with the landing on the Moon in 1969, was to prepare for war against the Great Mother Ship and its companion wheels harnessing an entire New Civilization and an Advanced Technology that is not of this world."

Her predictions were most fully communicated in her magnum opus entitled The Comer by Night in 1986, in which she asserts that Elijah Muhammad is still alive, living in a "space craft".

By the early 1990s she was arguing that it would be "the final decade" before the apocalypse, which would occur in 2001. The September 11 terrorist attacks, came to be viewed by some as confirmation of her predictions, with Muhammed herself claiming the destruction of the World Trade Center was accompanied by UFO manifestations.

Tynnetta Muhammad continued to support Farrakhan's vision for the Nation of Islam until her death on 16 February 2015.
