= Million Woman March =

1997 American protest in Philadelphia

The Million Woman March was a grassroots protest march for Black women in America that took place on October 25, 1997 in Philadelphia, Pennsylvania. The event was organized by local store owner Phile Chionesu and public housing activist Asia Coney, who worked independently of national organizations and spread awareness largely through the internet, flyers, local women's organizations, and word-of-mouth.

The event drew between 500,000 and over two million people to Benjamin Franklin Parkway, and is considered one of the largest demonstrations in American history. The organizers' 12-point platform included demands for an end to homelessness; support for currently and formerly-incarcerated Black women; improvements to education, health care, poverty, and services fighting addiction; an independent investigation into allegations of CIA drug trafficking; and release of people at the time considered political prisoners like Mumia Abu Jamal.

== Overview ==
The march was founded and formulated by Phile Chionesu, a grassroots activist, human rights advocate, black nationalist/freedom fighter, and owner of an African crafts shop. She was not associated with any national black organizations. After several months of underground organizing, Chionesu asked Asia Coney to join her as national co-chair.

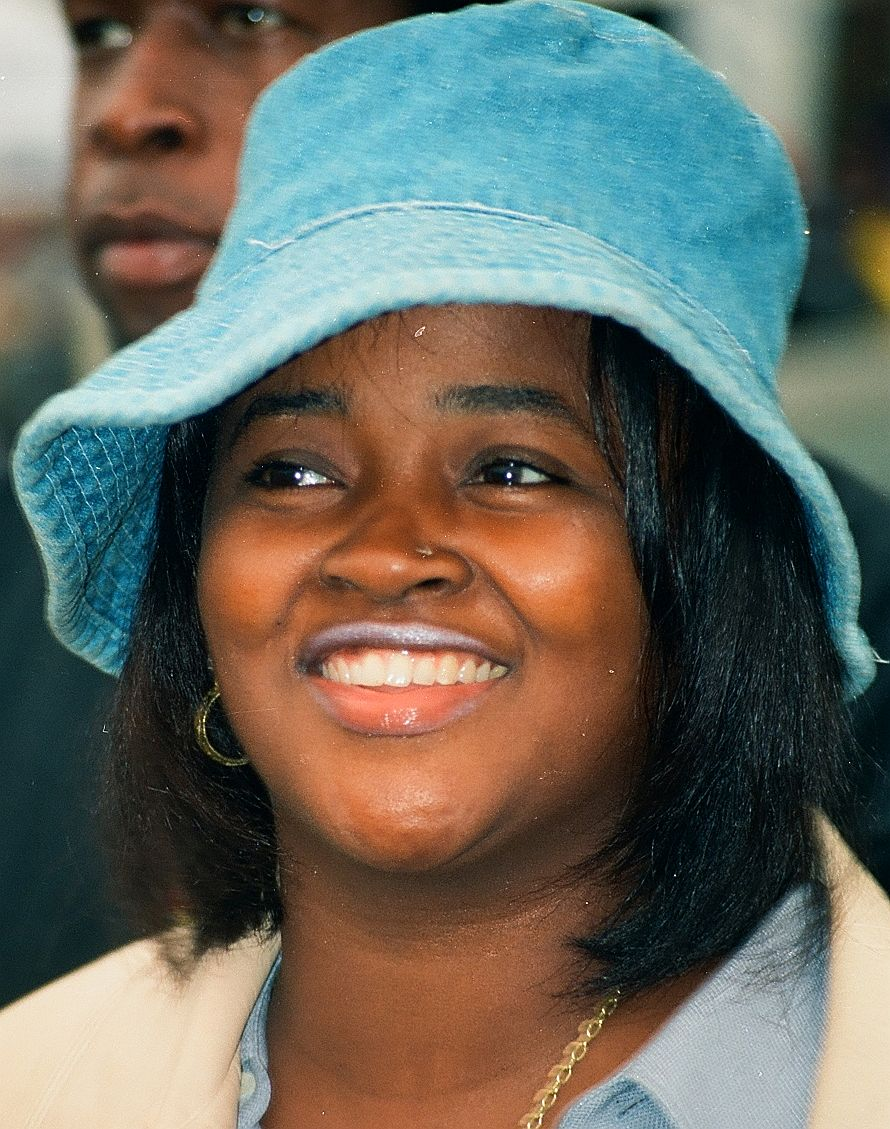
Sister Souljah in Philadelphia, 1997

The march started from the Liberty Bell and ended at the steps of the Philadelphia Art Museum, with scheduled hours of prayer, speeches, and music. Speakers at the event included Winnie Madikizela-Mandela, the ex-wife of Nelson Mandela; Congresswoman Maxine Waters; Sista Souljah; Jada Pinkett Smith; Attallah and Ilyasah Shabazz, the daughters of Malcolm X; and Dr. Dorothy Height. A message was read from Assata Shakur from her exile home of Cuba.

The march has been considered a social phenomenon due to its organizers' grassroots organizing and lack of support from national organizations. They shared information via media coordinators such as BWN NJ Delegate Stacey Chambers, Alpha Kappa Alpha, and by word of mouth, flyers, Black-run media, the Internet, and a network of women's organizations.

== Attendance ==
Police estimates ranged from 300,000 to 1 million, whereas organizers estimated an attendance of 1.5 to over 2 million. A study provided by the University of Pennsylvania that made use of aerial footage, photos, and other research data and information obtained from news and other sources, indicates that the gathering drew at least 500,000 people. The attendees came despite cold temperatures and light rain, with signs throughout the march reading, "I am one in a million" and "Black Women: No more AIDS, abuse, addiction".

== Mission ==
The broader mission of the Million Woman March was for the self-determination of African American women through economic and political solidarity, with Chionesu saying, "We want to prepare our women, no matter what their status in life, to look at how we can begin to invest as black women and how we can begin to vote in blocs as black women."

Many noted that while the Million Man March framed progress as requiring responsibility and "atonement", the Million Woman March organizers spoke more often of the need to change larger systems, such as the school, health care, education, and prison systems, as well as government entities such as the CIA. An investigation into the CIA's alleged involvement with drug trafficking, specifically of crack cocaine, was a focal point for speaker Maxine Waters and also the first of the organizers' twelve platform issues. The protest also emphasized issues of environmental racism, a focus of Madikizela-Mandela's speech.

The march was also intended to draw attention to statistics demonstrating the marginalization of African American women, including that 94 out of 1,000 African American teenage girls are victims of violent crime and African American women are eighteen times more probably to get AIDS than white women; in 1996, African American women earned $30 less than African American men per week, and $40 less than white women.

The Million Woman March has continued its mission under the direction of the founder and national offices, going on to organize over 50 conferences, over 100 forums, 12 years of online radio broadcasts, and many social justice protests for women and African-American women.

== See also ==
- Africana womanism
- Million Family March
- Million Man March
- Million Puppet March
