= Ishmael Muhammad =

Son of Elijah Muhammad and Tynnetta Muhammad (born 1964)

Assistant Minister Ishmael Muhammad
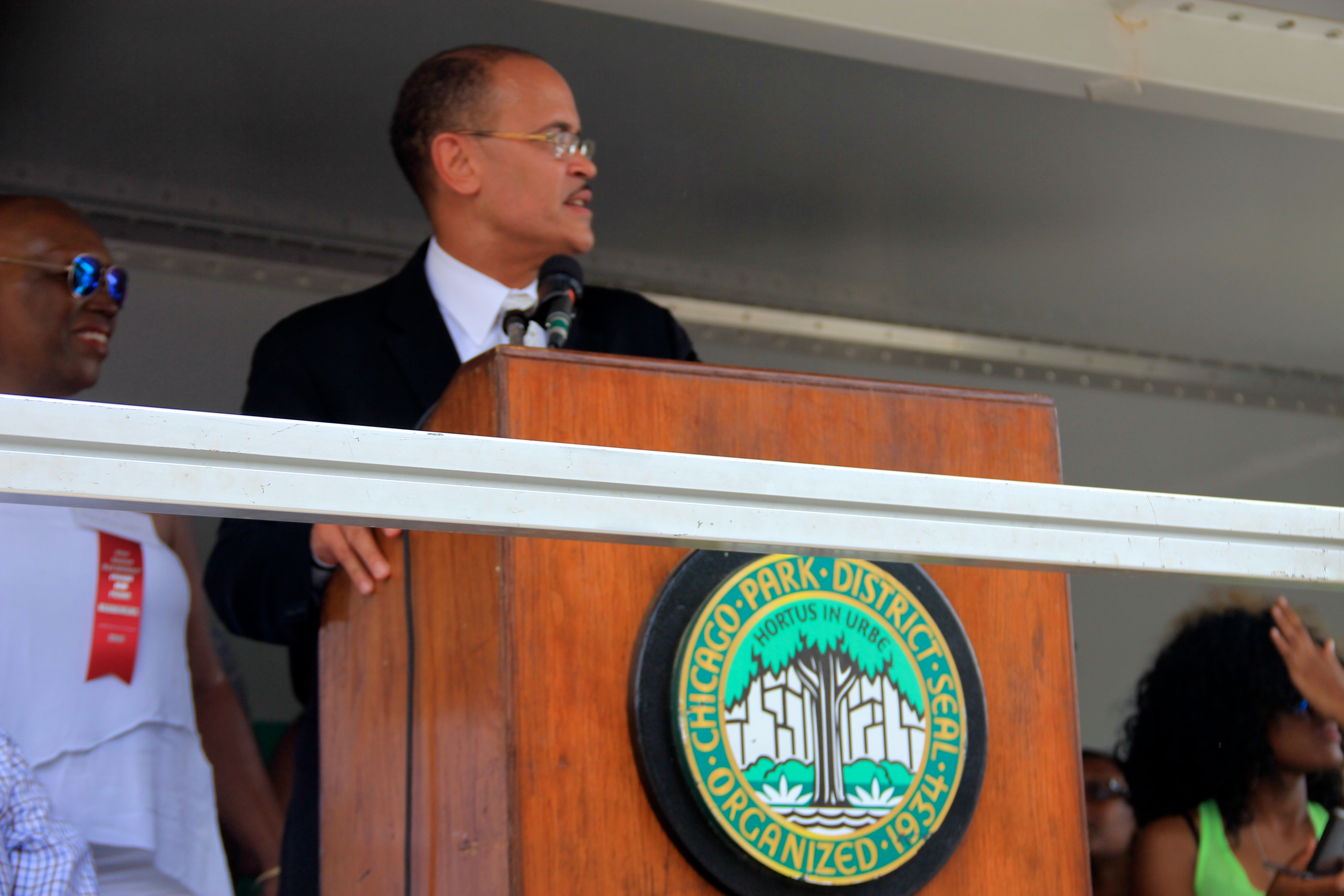
- Ishmael Muhammad in 2015

Nation of Islam national assistant minister
- Incumbent
- Assumed office 1991
- Preceded by: Position established

Personal details
- Born: Ishmael R. Muhammad; November 22, 1964 (age 61) Albuquerque, New Mexico
- Spouse: Unknown
- Children: Unknown

Ishmael Muhammad (born November 22, 1964) is an American minister for the Nation of Islam, an organization that combines black nationalism and some Islamic teachings. A son of Elijah Muhammad and Tynnetta Muhammad, he has served as the Nation of Islam national assistant minister to Louis Farrakhan since 1991. Muhammad is also a Council Member and "is sometimes considered the most likely successor" to Farrakhan to lead the Nation of Islam.

In 1995, Muhammad was a speaker at the Million Man March. Of Elijah Muhammad's 21 children, he is the eldest son of his mother Tynnetta Muhammad. He is the Student Minister at Mosque Maryam, the headquarters of the Nation of Islam.

Muhammad was featured on the Nation of Islam's national stage at the 2013 Holy Day of Atonement event on October 20, at which Muhammad delivered the keynote address in place of Louis Farrakhan who was unable to attend due to illness. Farrakhan's selection of Muhammad to speak in his absence may shed light on the future direction of the group's leadership. He played a prominent role at the large-scale event accompanying the funeral of his mother in February 2015.

For several decades, Ishmael Muhammad lived in Cuernavaca, Mexico, focusing on religious study, before returning to the NOI headquarters in Chicago.
