= Million Family March =

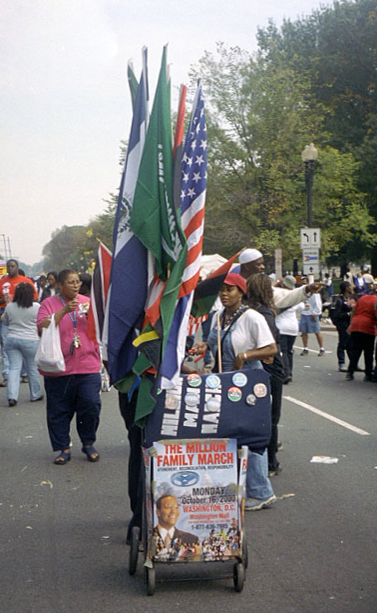
Million Family March

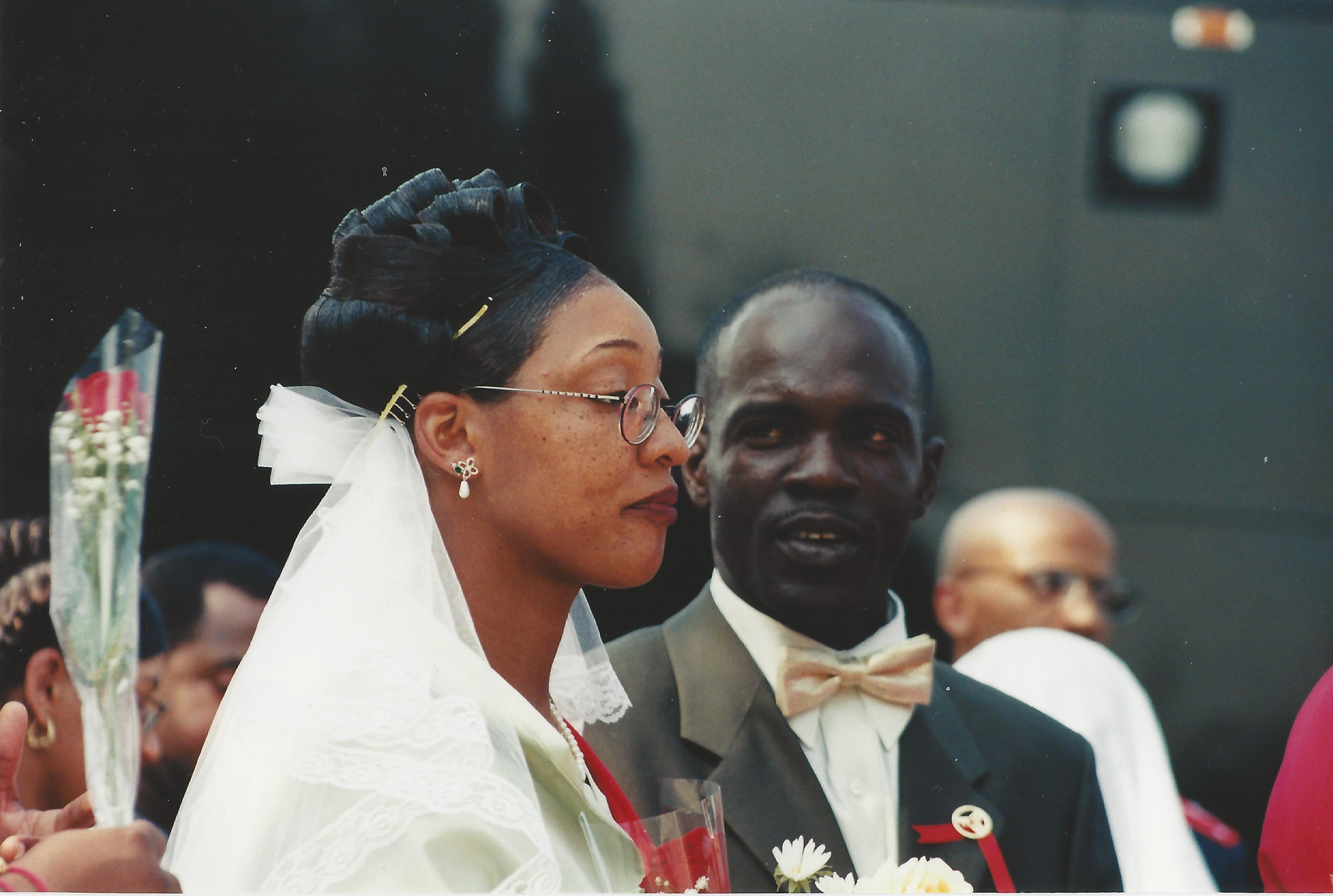
Couple partaking in a "sacred marriage" blessing at the march

The Million Family March was a rally in Washington D.C. to celebrate family unity and racial and religious harmony; as well as to address other issues, including abortion, capital punishment, health care, education, welfare and Social Security reform, substance abuse prevention, and overhaul of the World Bank and International Monetary Fund. The march’s organizers also planned a voter registration drive and hoped that participants would be encouraged to vote in the upcoming presidential and congressional elections.

Louis Farrakhan was the main speaker and the event was sponsored by his organization, The Nation of Islam, and by Sun Myung Moon's Family Federation for World Peace and Unification (usually known as the Unification Church). It was held on October 16, 2000; the fifth anniversary of the Million Man March, which was also organized by Farrakhan.

Benjamin Chavis Muhammad, the national director for the march, when asked by USA Today if he thought it would be as successful as the Million Man March answered: "Yes, we believe that the Million Family March will be as successful as the Million Man March. But the Million Man March and the Million Family March have different objectives. One builds on the other. The Million Family March is an expansion of the Million Man March."

Farrakhan told Nation of Islam members: "I don't want us to get bent out of shape because folk of another race desire to help. I say to the Muslims that are present that I am grateful for the help of the Family Federation for World Peace under Rev. and Mrs. Moon … The Honorable Elijah Muhammad told us that people would come from the East, that they would teach us everything we need to know in order to be the people that God meant for us to be."

Dan Fefferman, a leader in the Unification Church of the United States, wrote a letter to fellow Unification Church members saying that Rev. Moon knew that some of them had "problems with Minister Farrakhan", including the Nation of Islam's push for "a ban on interracial marriage and their support for a separate nation for American blacks … There are certainly policies in the march's agenda … which most of us do not support … our support for the march is limited to central themes such as the God-centered family, interracial harmony, interreligous unity and moral revival."

In his speech Farrakhan called for racial harmony.

== See also ==
- Africana womanism
- List of protest marches on Washington, D.C.
- Million Man March
- Million Woman March
- Unification Church and Islam
- Unification Church of the United States
