= Atonement (disambiguation) =

Atonement is the concept of a person taking action to correct previous wrongdoing on their part.

Atonement may also refer to:

== Religion ==
- Atonement in Judaism
  - Yom Kippur, the Day of Atonement, the biblical/Jewish observance
- Atonement in Christianity
  - Atonement (governmental view)
  - Atonement (moral influence view)
  - Atonement (penal substitution view)
  - Atonement (ransom view)
  - Atonement (satisfaction view)
  - Substitutionary atonement
  - Society of the Atonement
  - Universal atonement, as in:
    - Unlimited atonement, the doctrine that the atonement is unlimited in extent
    - Universal reconciliation, the doctrine that all will eventually come to salvation
- Atonement Academy, a parochial Catholic school in San Antonio, Texas
- Blood atonement, a concept in Mormonism
- Day of Atonement (Nation of Islam)
- Vergangenheitsbewältigung, post-WW2 German denazification and repentance

== Arts, entertainment, and media ==
=== Films ===
- Atonement (1919 film), an American drama film directed by William Humphrey
- Atonement (2007 film), a British film directed by Joe Wright, based on Ian McEwan's novel
- Atonement (2026 film), an American drama film written, directed, and produced by Reed Van Dyk

=== Music ===
==== Albums and soundtracks ====
- Atonement (Your Memorial album) and its title track, 2010
- Atonement (Immolation album), 2017
- Atonement (Killswitch Engage album), 2019
- Atonement (soundtrack), the soundtrack from the 2007 film Atonement

==== Songs ====
- "Atonement", a song by Benjamin Clementine from the album And I Have Been, 2022
- "Atonement", a song by Bloc Party, a b-side to their single "I Still Remember"
- "Atonement", a song by Heaven Shall Burn of their Iconoclast (Part 1: The Final Resistance)
- "Atonement", a song by Leprous from the album Melodies of Atonement
- "Atonement", a song by Living Sacrifice from the album Nonexistent
- "Atonement", a song by Opeth from the album Ghost Reveries
- "Atonement", a song by The Roots from the album Game Theory

=== Other arts, entertainment, and media ===
- "Atonement" (Babylon 5), a Babylon 5 television series episode
- Atonement (novel), a 2001 novel by Ian McEwan
- Tsugunai: Atonement, a 2001 role-playing videogame
