= Michael Bellavia =

American businessman

Michael Bellavia is an Emmy winning producer with more than 30 production credits and a digital marketing executive. He is also an owner of HelpGood, an advertising agency and certified B Corp in New York City and Los Angeles that works with nonprofits and organizations focused on making a social impact including California Coalition Against Sexual Assault, Housing Works, and the Ad Council on the Smokey Bear campaign for which the company was the recipient of the Gold Smokey Bear Award. In October 2012, he co-founded the Million Puppet March that marched on the National Mall in Washington, D.C.

He was the CEO of Animax Entertainment, an animation, game, and interactive content production company. While at Animax, in 2006, Bellavia won one of the first broadband Emmy Awards for a series of animated shorts that were produced for ESPN. Animax was nominated for another Emmy in 2007. At Animax he also led the company to the Inc. 500 list in 2009.

Bellavia earned his BS in Engineering from the University of Michigan and his MBA from Columbia Business School. He is a former Chair of the Producers Guild of America New Media Council, a member of the National Academy of Television Arts and Sciences, and a former mentor at the American Film Institute's Digital Content Lab.

Bellavia was an improviser at IO West (the Los Angeles outpost of IO Chicago), Upright Citizens Brigade Theatre, and The Second City in Los Angeles. He has been a contestant on several game shows, including Let's Make a Deal, 25 Words or Less, Wheel of Fortune, Smush, Pyramid, Emogenius, Boom!, Lingo, The Great Escape, and On the Cover.
