= Millions More Movement =

Millions More Movement logo

The Millions More Movement was launched by a broad coalition of African American leaders to mark the commemoration of the 10th Anniversary of the Million Man March. A mass march on Washington, DC, was held on October 15, 2005, to galvanize public support for the movement's goals. The march was open to men, women, and children and focused on creating lasting relationships between participating individuals, faith-based organizations, and community institutions. The movement only rallied a few thousand protesters and was seen as a disappointment.

== Issues and goals ==
Ten key issues identified by the movement organizers are:

Unity, Spiritual Values, Education, Economic Development, Political Power, Reparations, Prison Industrial Complex, Health, Artistic/Cultural Development, Peace

In An Open Letter on the Millions More Movement, Louis Farrakhan stated in part,

For the first time in our history, those of us of different ideologies, philosophies, methodologies, denominations, sects, and religions, political and fraternal affiliations have come together to create the Millions More Movement. Each of us, who have agreed to work together for the benefit of the whole of our people, have said from our particular platforms, based on our beliefs and understanding or the lack thereof, words that have offended members of our own people and others; and our ideology, philosophy, religion, and pronouncements may have hurt the ears and sentiments of others outside of our community. Therefore, this has kept us working inside of our own circles with those who think as we think or believe as we believe. As a result, some of us would never appear on the same stage with one another, for fear of being hurt by association with those with whom we have serious disagreements.

The Millions More Movement is challenging all of us to rise above the things that have kept us divided in the past, by focusing us on the agenda of the Millions More Movement to see how all of us, with all of our varied differences, can come together and direct our energy, not at each other, but at the condition of the reality of the suffering of our people, that we might use all of our skills, gifts and talents to create a better world for ourselves, our children, grandchildren and great grandchildren.

== Leaders/co-convenors ==
- Minister Louis Farrakhan, National Representative of Elijah Muhammad and the Nation of Islam
- Reverend Willie Wilson, National Executive Director
- Leonard Muhammad, National Deputy Director

=== National co-conveners (partial list) ===
- Mrs. Coretta Scott King, Martin Luther King Jr. Center for Nonviolent Social Change
- Dr. Benjamin Chavis Muhammad, Hip Hop Summit Action Network
- Rev. Dr. Barbara Williams-Skinner, Skinner Leadership Institute
- Dr. Dorothy Height, National Council of Negro Women
- Dr. Conrad Worrill, National Black United Front
- Attorney Malik Zulu Shabazz, New Black Panther Party
- Charles Steele, Southern Christian Leadership Conference
- Reverend Jesse Jackson, Rainbow/PUSH Coalition
- Phile Chionesu, Millions Women Movement
- Ambassador Asiel Ben Israel, Hebrew Israelite Nation
- Marc Morial, National Urban League
- Councilman Marion Barry and Cora Masters-Barry
- Dr. Julianne Malveaux, author and columnist
- Reverend Al Sharpton, National Action Network
- Dr. Maulana Karenga, The US Organization
- Rt. Bishop Vashti Murphy McKenzie, African Methodist Episcopal Church
- Jim Brown, Amer-I-Can
- Susan L. Taylor, Essence magazine
- Ramona Edelin, Black Leadership Forum
- Fredrica Bey, Women in Support of the Million Man March
- Rev. Michael Jenkins, Family Federation for World Peace and Unification
- Rev. John Hunter, First A.M.E. Church
- Tom Joyner
- Tavis Smiley
- Erykah Badu
- Dr. Leonard Jeffries
- Bob Law
- Danny Bakewell
- Dr. Baba Hannibal Afrik
- Dr. Joseph Lowery
- Dr. Ray Winbush
- Dr. Faye Williams
- Dr. Susan Newman
- Rev. Floyd Flake
- Pastor T.L. Barrett
- Rev. Dr. Barbara King-Outley
- Rev. Dr. Maxine Walker
- Rev. Walter Fauntroy
- Rev. Al Sampson
- Bishop Alvin Richardson
- Bishop Augustus Stallings
- Dennis Courland Hayer
- Kwesi Mfume
- Dr. Molefi Kete Asante
- Ron Daniels
- Ron Walters
- Dr. Julian Bond
- Ambassador Andrew Young
- Ambassador Carole Moseley-Braun
- Rep. Eleanor Holmes Norton (D.C.)

== Endorsers ==
- AME Church
- AME Zion Church
- Christian Methodist Episcopal Church
- Congressional Black Caucus
- International Brotherhood of Teamsters Union
- National Association of Black Social Workers
- National Bar Association
- National Baptist Convention of America
- National Baptist Convention
- National Black Student Government Association
- National Coalition for Reparations for Blacks in America
- National Federation of Colored Women’s Clubs
- National Medical Association
- National Pan-Hellenic Council
- Universal Negro Improvement Association

== Abbreviated calendar of events ==
- Friday, October 14, National Day of Absence
- Saturday, October 15, Official start of events at 10 a.m., some pre-event activities as early as 6 a.m.
- Sunday, October 16, Mass Unity Interfaith, Interdenominational Service Sunday evening

== See also ==
- List of protest marches on Washington, D.C.
