= The Final Call (newspaper) =

American religious and political news publication

- Type: Newspaper
- Format: Tabloid
- Owner: Nation of Islam
- Editor: Naba'a Muhammad
- Founded: 1979
- Headquarters: 734 W. 79th St, Chicago, IL 60620
- ISSN: 1090-7327
- Website: new.finalcall.com

The Final Call (ISSN 1090-7327) is a newspaper published in Chicago. It was founded in 1979 by Minister Louis Farrakhan and serves as the official newspaper of the Nation of Islam. The newspaper acts as the group's tool to explain their goals, and to report on world events and natural disasters.

== History ==
The original newspaper of the Nation of Islam was called The Final Call to Islam and was published by Nation of Islam Leader Messenger Elijah Muhammad in the 1930s. This small newspaper evolved into Muhammad Speaks in the 1960s and attracted a circulation of 900,000 per week, with monthly circulation of 2.5 million. Louis Farrakhan later began to publish The Final Call, which follows the traditions of the older Muhammad Speaks newspaper with national and international news and coverage of political issues and is the official communications media of the Nation of Islam. The current editor-in-chief is Richard B. Muhammad.

== Reception ==
The newspaper has been criticized as anti-White, homophobic and antisemitic by the Southern Poverty Law Center and the Anti-Defamation League. Farrakhan has denied these characterizations.
