= Million Puppet March =

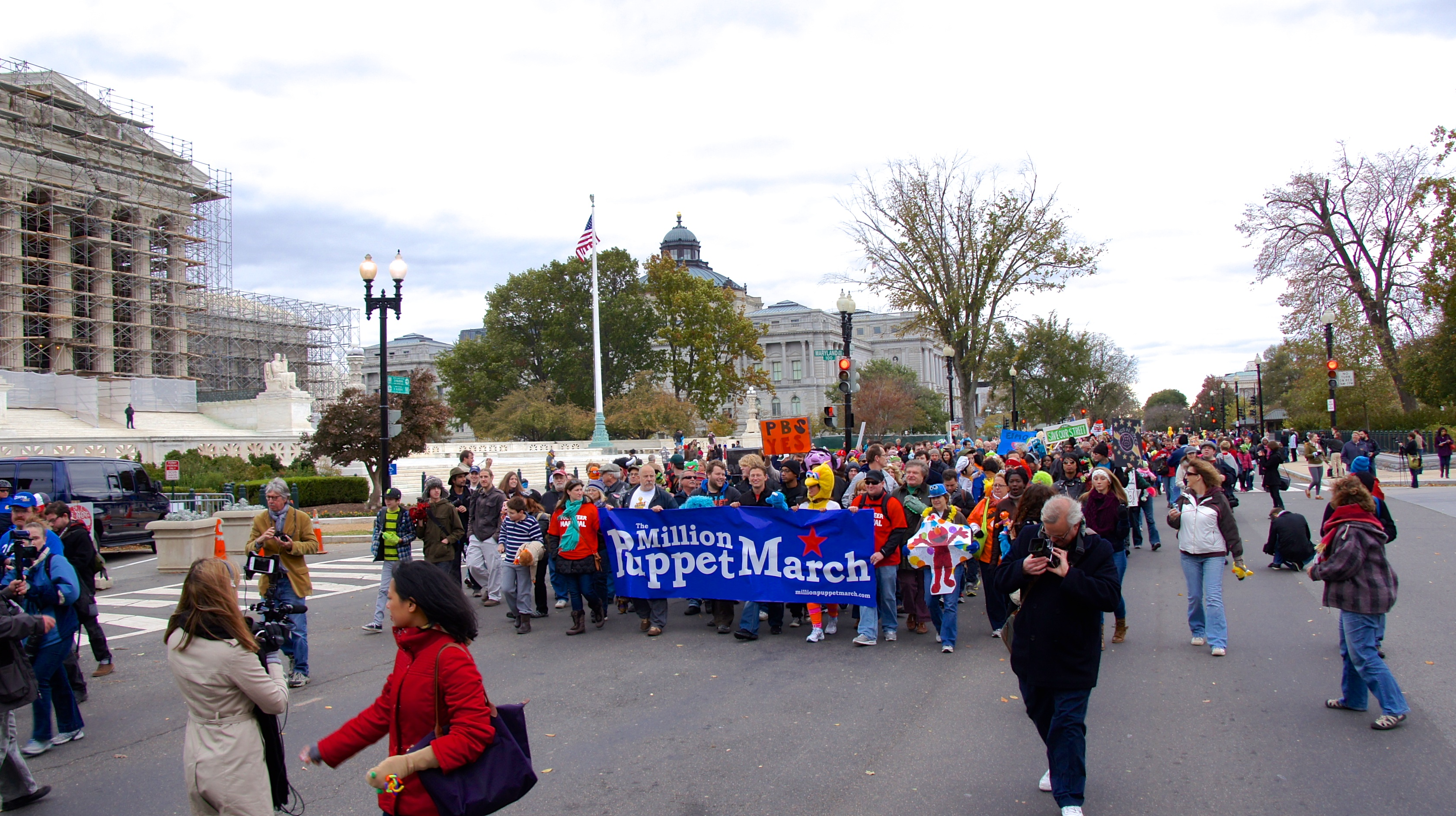
Pro-public media protesters pass the Supreme Court of the United States in the Million Puppet March.

Initially called the Million Muppet March, the Million Puppet March was a grassroots rally in Washington, D.C., organized during the 2012 U.S. presidential campaign in support of continued public funding of public media. The March took place on November 3, 2012.

Co-organized by Michael Bellavia and Chris Mecham, the march was inspired by the comments of Presidential hopeful Mitt Romney during his 2012 presidential debate with Barack Obama. Romney promised to end funding for public broadcasting, saying during the debate that he would stop the federal subsidy to PBS. In particular, Romney added, "I like PBS, I love Big Bird." Bellavia and Mecham viewed Romney's threat as a straw man argument on the issue of the Federal budget and a dog whistle to ultra-conservatives meant to convey his position on social issues.

The 2012 Million Puppet March, which drew some 1,500 participants, received recognition from Record Setter as the largest puppet march. Participants included Bread and Puppet Theater, the makers of the I Am Big Bird: The Caroll Spinney Story documentary that featured the original performer of Sesame Street characters Big Bird and Oscar the Grouch, Beale Street Puppets, the cast of STUFT, and Craig Aaron, executive director of Free Press.

The organizers of the March continue to support public media with ongoing education and advocacy efforts around puppetry with other parades and mobilizations around the country including Santa Monica, California, and Denver.

== See also ==
- List of protest marches on Washington, D.C.
