= Muhammad Speaks =

Defunct American newspaper

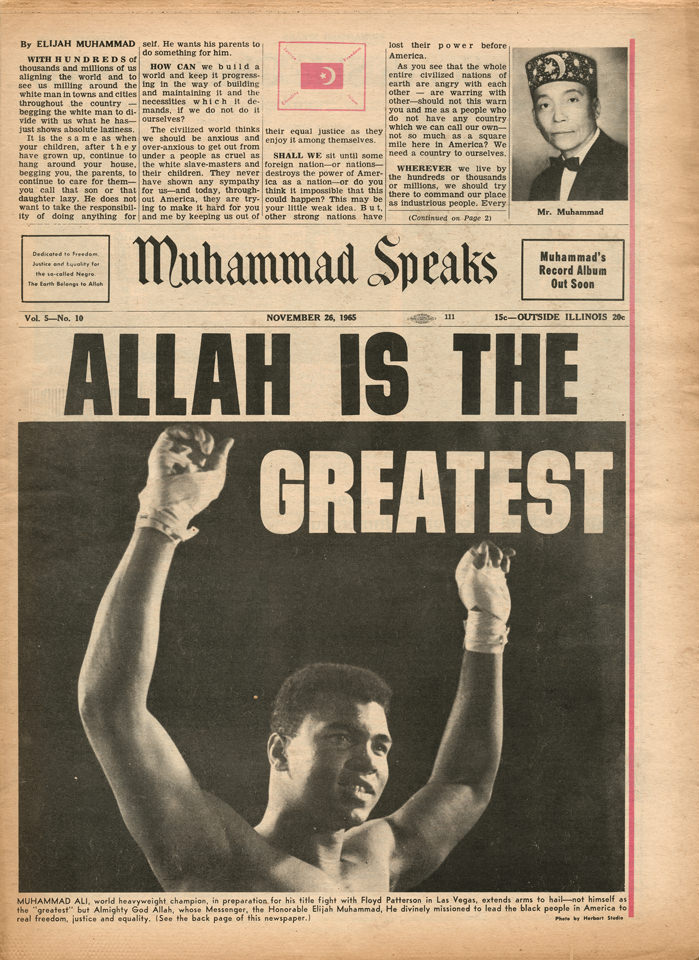
November 26, 1965 cover featuring Muhammad Ali

Muhammad Speaks was a Black Muslim newspaper published in the United States. It was one of the most widely read newspapers ever produced by an African American organization. It was the official newspaper of the Nation of Islam from 1960 to 1975, founded by a group of Elijah Muhammad's ministers, including Malcolm X.

After Elijah Muhammad's death in 1975, it was renamed several times after Warith Deen Mohammed moved the Nation of Islam into mainstream Sunni Islam, culminating in The Muslim Journal. A number of rival journals were also published, including The Final Call under Louis Farrakhan, claiming to continue the message of the original.

== Origins ==
Nation of Islam leader Elijah Muhammad began the publication in May 1960. Its first issue bore the title Some of this Earth to Call Our Own or Else. A weekly publication, it was circulated nationwide by the Nation of Islam (N.O.I.) and focused on global current events, along with significant news within African-American communities, particularly stories related to the Nation of Islam.

The paper was sold door-to-door and on street corners by Nation of Islam members (Fruit of Islam), at select newsstands in major cities and in the temples of the Nation of Islam. In his The Autobiography of Malcolm X, activist Malcolm X claimed to have founded the newspaper, but this has not been independently confirmed. According to the current Nation of Islam, Malcolm X helped create Mr. Muhammad Speaks, a different newspaper distributed locally in New York City.

Notably, Mr. Muhammad Speaks and Muhammad Speaks have nearly identical layout, content and journalistic approach, suggesting that Mr. Muhammad Speaks provided the foundation for Muhammad Speaks. It is also believed that Jabir Herbert Muhammad had a hand in starting the paper.

In addition to FOI-based ventures, Elijah Muhammad had used the nation's African-American press to publicize the organization and his views. In the 1950s his regular column in the Pittsburgh Courier, at the time the nation's largest black-owned newspaper, generated more letters to the editor than any other feature in the newspaper.

== Renamings ==
Following the death of Elijah Muhammad, his son and successor Warith Deen Muhammad renamed the newspaper Bilalian News in 1976. The title was a reference to Bilal ibn Rabah, the first known black African follower of the Islamic prophet Muhammad. The renaming was part of Warith Deen's project to realign the Nation of Islam with mainstream Sunni Islam.

The newspaper was renamed once more in 1981, becoming World Muslim News, and was finally given the name The Muslim Journal, which is still in circulation today.

== Competing titles ==
In 1979, Minister Louis Farrakhan founded The Final Call, a newspaper published in Chicago, that serves as the official communications organ of the current Nation of Islam, which had been re-founded in reaction to Warith Deen's reforms. The title derives from the original newspaper of The Nation of Islam, called The Final Call to Islam, published by Elijah Muhummad in the 1940s.

There are a number of publications that hold claims to continuing in the tradition of the original paper, such as "Muhammad Speaks Newspaper" published out of Detroit, Michigan, by Minister Levi Karim, and one of the same name published by Minister Wasim Muhammad in Camden, New Jersey. The Muhammad Speaks in Detroit and Camden is published by followers of Elijah Muhammad who assert that they hold on to the traditional practices of Elijah Muhammad.

== See also ==
- Richard Durham – creator of the radio series Destination Freedom, who also edited Muhammad Speaks
