= Day of Atonement (Nation of Islam) =

The Day of Atonement, October 16, was established during the Million Man March in Washington, DC, on October 16, 1995 by the Nation of Islam.

== Premise ==
The Day of Atonement is one on which American black men swear to refrain from crime, drug addiction, and family abuse. During the rally, Louis Farrakhan recited the following pledge and asked all men present to repeat after him and take the pledge.

== The Pledge ==
I PLEDGE that from this day forward I will strive to love my brother as I love myself. I, from this day forward, will strive to improve myself spiritually, morally, mentally, socially, politically and economically for the benefit of myself, my family and my people. I pledge that I will strive to build businesses, build houses, build hospitals, build factories and enter into international trade for the good of myself, my family and my people.

I PLEDGE that from this day forward I will never raise my hand with a knife or a gun to beat, cut, or shoot any member of my family or any human being except in self-defense. I pledge from this day forward I will never abuse my wife by striking her, disrespecting her, for she is the mother of my children and the producer of my future. I pledge that from this day forward I will never engage in the abuse of children, little boys or little girls for sexual gratification. For I will let them grow in peace to be strong men and women for the future of our people.

I WILL never again use the ‘B word’ to describe any female. But particularly my own Black sister. I pledge from this day forward that I will not poison my body with drugs or that which is destructive to my health and my well-being. I pledge from this day forward I will support Black newspapers, Black radio, Black television. I will support Black artists who clean up their acts to show respect for themselves and respect for their people and respect for the ears of the human family. I will do all of this so help me God.

== Sources ==
- CNN transcript of Minister Farrakhan’s speech
